= IFFHS =

Organisation chronicling the history and records of association football

International Federation of Football History & Statistics
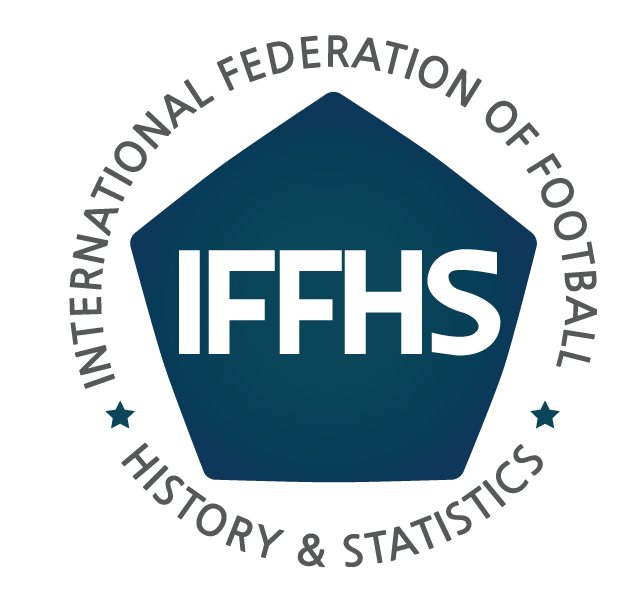
- Formation: 1984
- Headquarters: Zürich, Switzerland
- Official language: English, French, Spanish, German
- President: Saleh Irfan Bahwini
- Website: iffhs.com/en

The International Federation of Football History & Statistics (IFFHS) is an organisation that chronicles the history and records of association football. It was founded in 1984 by Alfredo Pöge in Leipzig. The IFFHS was based in Abu Dhabi for some time but in 2010 relocated to Bonn, Germany, and then in 2014 to Zürich.

From its early stages to 2002, the IFFHS concentrated on publishing the quarterly magazines Fußball-Weltzeitschrift, Libero spezial deutsch and Libero international. When these had to be discontinued for reasons which were not officially told, the organisation published its material in a series of multi-lingual books in co-operation with sponsors. The statistical organisation has now confined its publishing activities to its website. The IFFHS has no affiliation with FIFA, but FIFA has cited awards and records conducted by the IFFHS on their website.

In 2008, Karl Lennartz, a sports historian and professor at the University of Cologne, Germany, called the organisation "obscure", describing it as a one-man show of its founder Alfredo Pöge. IFFHS rankings and their significance have been a matter of criticism and the largest German news agency, Deutsche Presse-Agentur, refuse to publish them. Furthermore, German die Tageszeitung stated that the IFFHS rankings serves merely for publicity, although Bild, Deutsche Welle, Kicker-Sportmagazin, the German Football Association (DFB), and former president of the Association of West German Sports Journalists (German: Verbandes Westdeutscher Sportjournalisten — VWS) Heribert Faßbender have referenced the IFFHS.

== The World's Best Club ==
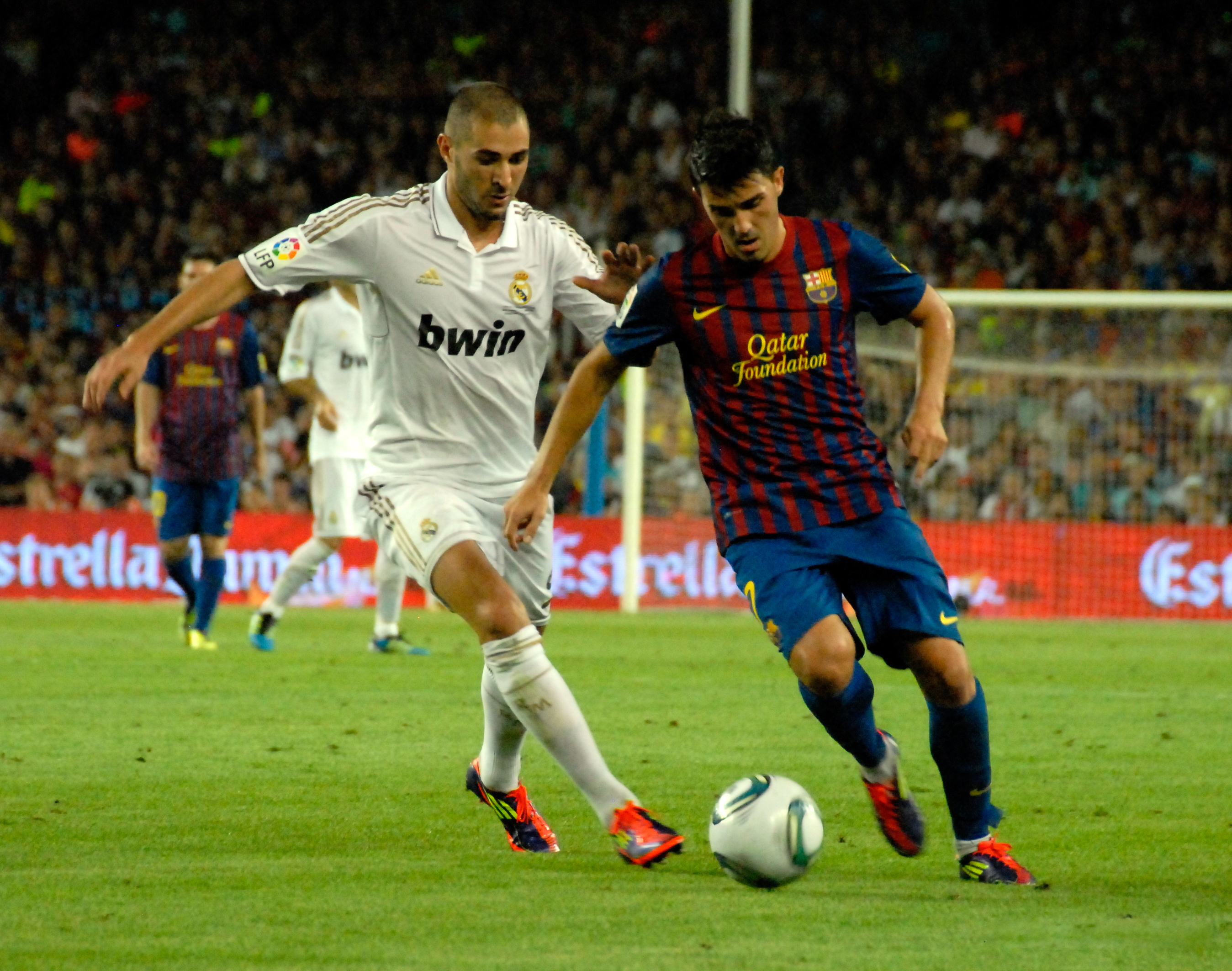
Real Madrid and Barcelona, ten-time winners of the world's Best Club award

Since 1991, the entity has produced a monthly Club World Ranking. The ranking takes into consideration the results of twelve months of continental and intercontinental competitions, national league matches (including play-offs) and the most important national cup (excluding points won before the round of 16). All countries are rated at four levels based upon the national league performance—clubs in the highest level leagues receive 4 points for each match won, 2 for a draw and 0 for a defeat. Level 2 is assigned 3 pts. (win), 1.5 (draw) and 0 (lost), and so on with the next lower levels.

In continental competitions, all clubs receive the same number of points at all stages regardless of the performance level of their leagues. However, the UEFA Champions League and the Copa Libertadores yield more points than UEFA Europa League and Copa Sudamericana, respectively. The point assignment system is still lower for the AFC, CAF, CONCACAF and OFC continental tournaments. Competitions between two continents are evaluated depending upon their importance. Competitions not organised by a continental confederation, or any intercontinental events not recognized by FIFA, are not taken into consideration.

=== Men's winners ===
Winners (1991–present)
Club	Wins	Years
(Spain) Real Madrid	5	2000, 2002, 2014, 2017, 2024
(Spain) Barcelona	5	1997, 2009, 2011, 2012, 2015
(England) Liverpool	3	2001, 2005, 2019
(Italy) Juventus	2	1993, 1996
(Italy) Milan	2	1995, 2003
(Spain) Sevilla	2	2006, 2007
(England) Manchester United	2	1999, 2008
(Italy) Inter Milan	2	1998, 2010
(Germany) Bayern Munich	2	2013, 2020
(France) Paris Saint-Germain	2	1994, 2025
(Italy) Roma	1	1991
(Netherlands) Ajax	1	1992
(Colombia) Atlético Nacional	1	2016
(Spain) Atlético Madrid	1	2018
(Brazil) Palmeiras	1	2021
(Brazil) Flamengo	1	2022
(England) Manchester City	1	2023

=== Continental Men's Clubs of the Century (1901–2000) ===
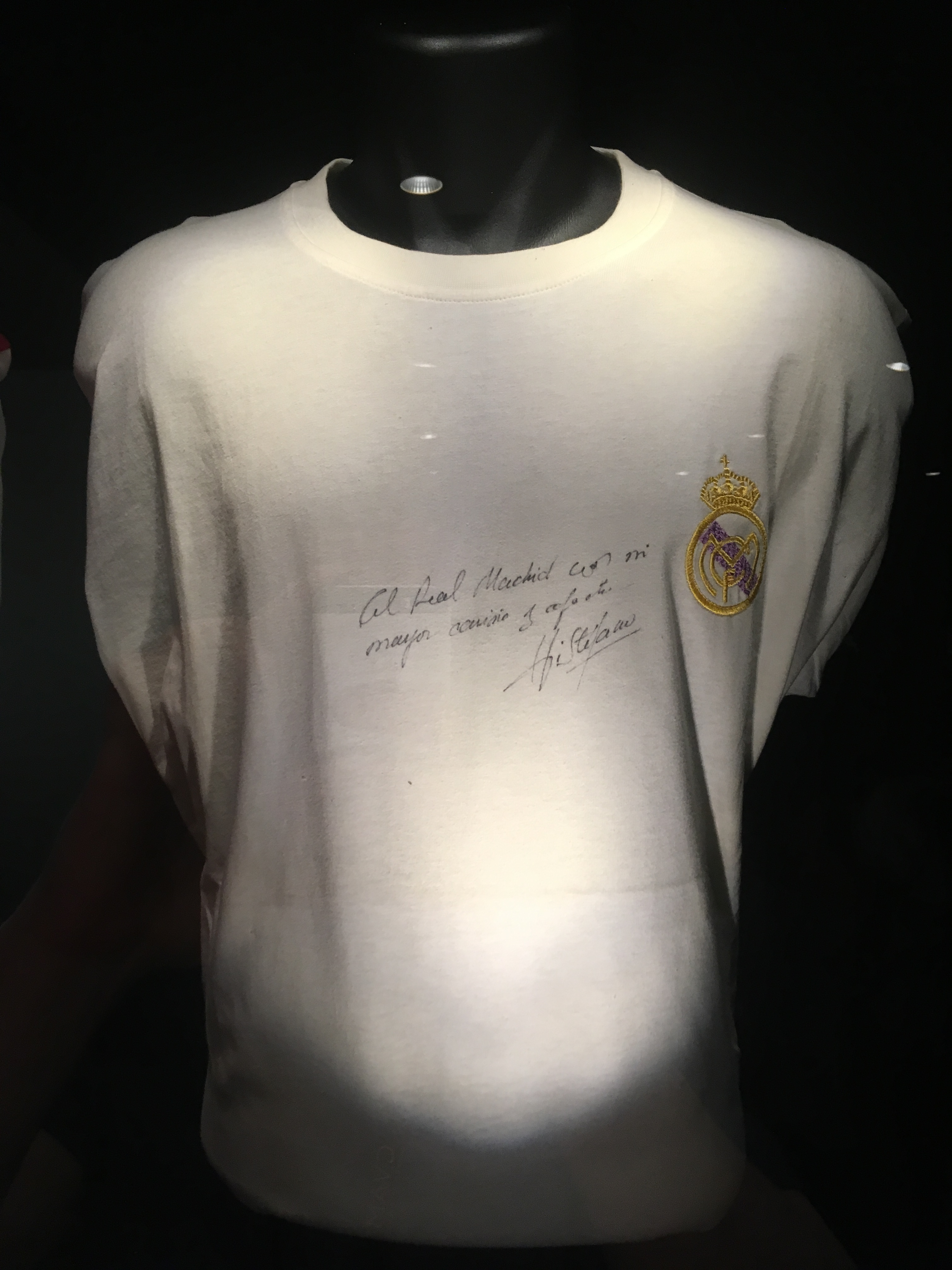
Real Madrid, European club of the 20th century

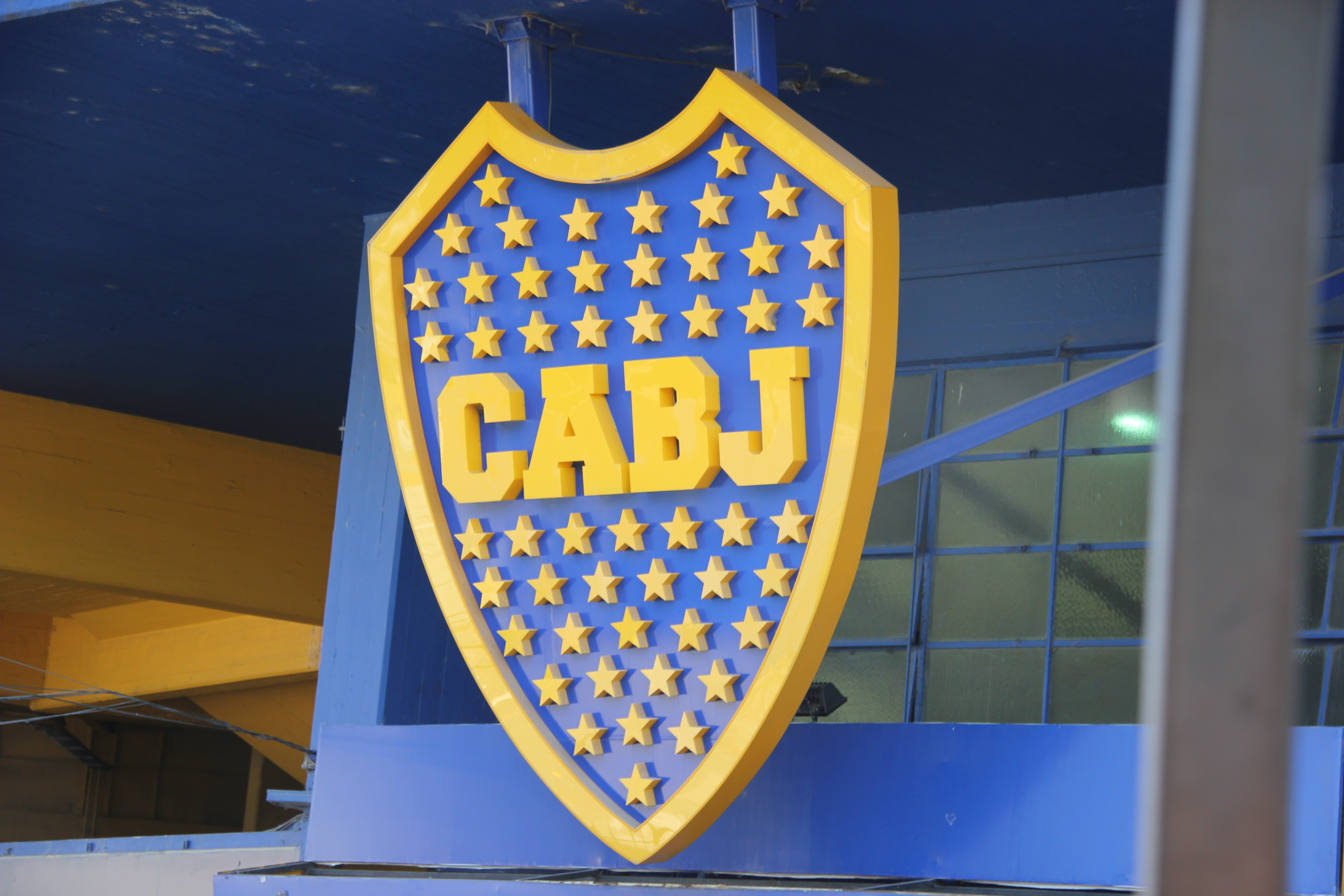
Boca Juniors, South American team of the decade (2001–2010)

In 2009, the IFFHS released the results of a statistical study series which determined the best continental clubs of the 20th century. The ranking did not consider the performance of the teams in national football tournaments (except in the Oceania's club ranking due to limited editions held under OFC club competitions), the performance in the intercontinental or worldwide club competitions or those submitted in the IFFHS Club World Ranking, available since 1991.

Based on this study, which assigned a weighted score criteria applied for each competition analysed, the below six clubs were named as "continental clubs of the century" by the IFFHS between 10 September and 13 October 2009. These clubs were awarded with a golden trophy and a certificate during the World Football Gala celebrated at Fulham, London, on 11 May 2010.

Continent	Club
Europe	(Spain) Real Madrid
South America	(Uruguay) Peñarol
Africa	(Ghana) Asante Kotoko
Asia	(Saudi Arabia) Al-Hilal
CONCACAF	(Costa Rica) Saprissa
Oceania	(Australia) South Melbourne

=== The Best Men's Club of the Decade ===
In 2012, the IFFHS recognised Barcelona as the World's Best Club Team of the Decade for the first decade of the 21st century (2001–2010). In 2021, Barcelona were recognised as the world's best club also for the second decade (2011–2020).

Decade	World	Europe	South America	CONCACAF	Africa	Asia	Oceania
2001–2010	(Spain) Barcelona	(Spain) Barcelona	(Argentina) Boca Juniors	(Mexico) América	(Egypt) Al Ahly	(Saudi Arabia) Al-Hilal	(New Zealand) Auckland City
2011–2020	(Spain) Barcelona	(Spain) Barcelona	(Brazil) Grêmio	(Mexico) UANL	(Tunisia) Espérance de Tunis	(South Korea) Jeonbuk Hyundai Motors	(New Zealand) Auckland City

=== Women's winners ===
Multiple winners (2012–present)
Club	Wins	Years
(France) Lyon	7	2012, 2015, 2016, 2017, 2018, 2019, 2020
(Spain) Barcelona	5	2021, 2022, 2023, 2024, 2025
(Germany) VfL Wolfsburg	2	2013, 2014

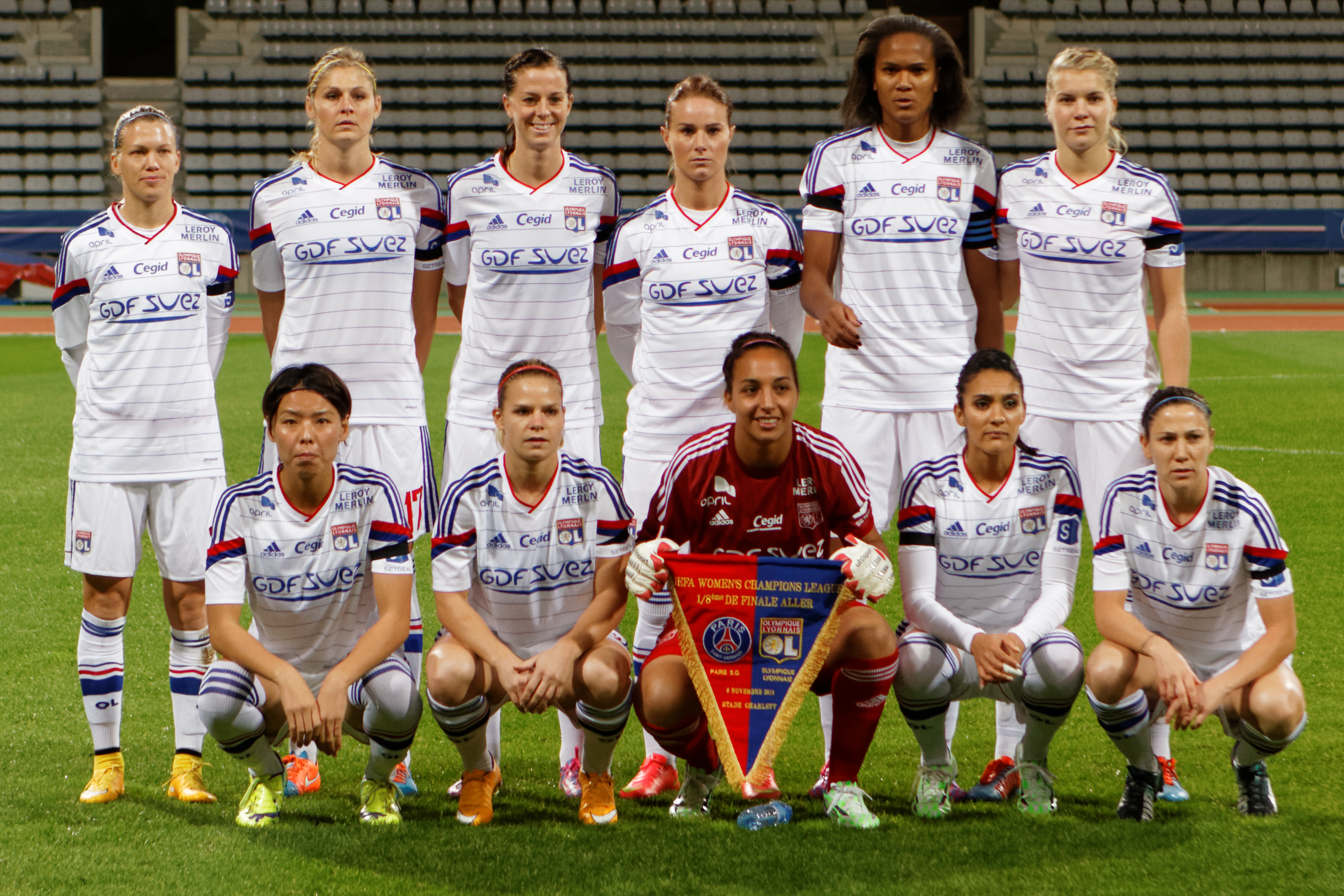
Lyon, seven-time winner of the Women's World's Best Club award

== The World's Strongest National League ==
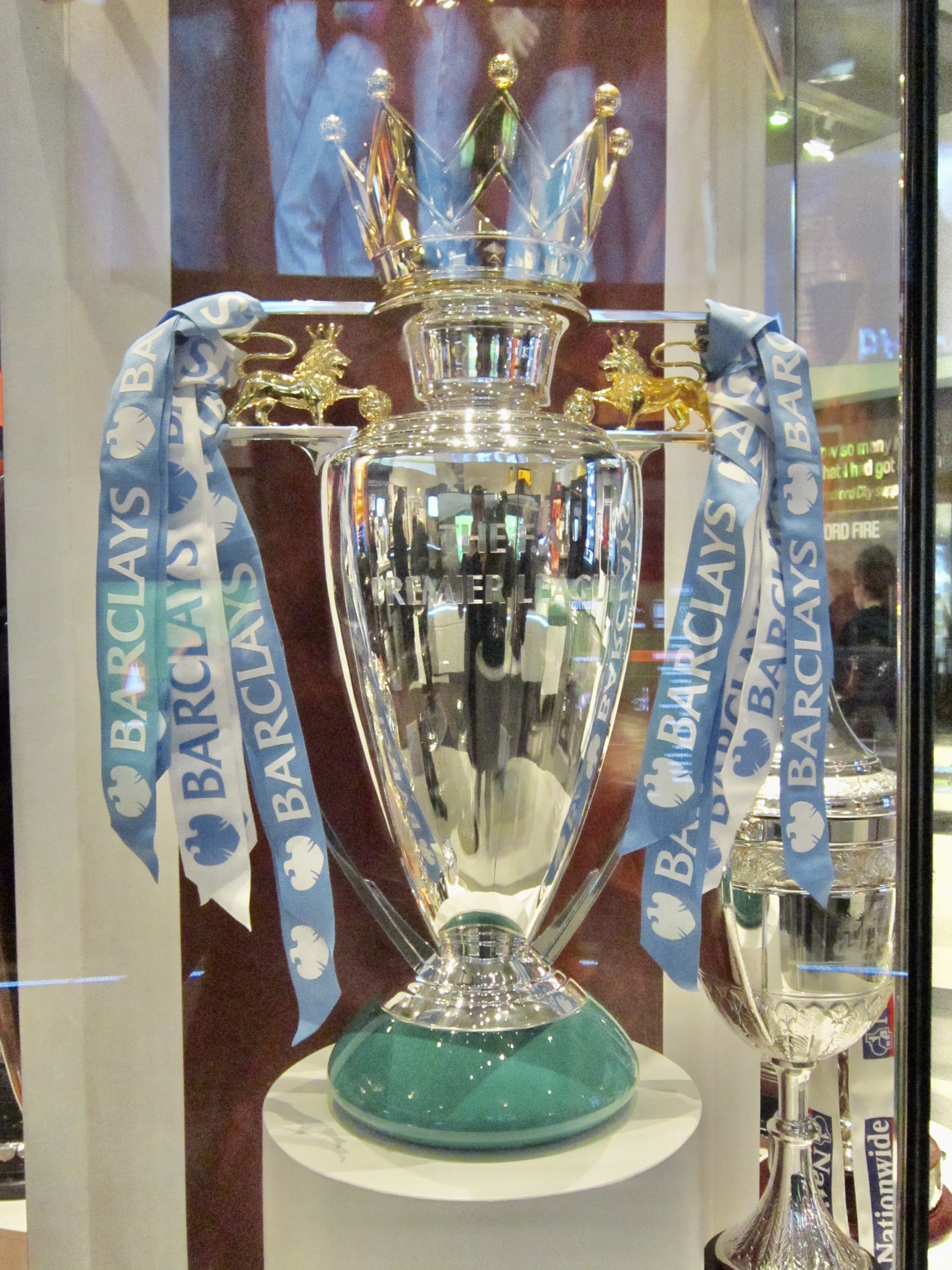
Premier League, Strongest National League of the Decade (2001–2010)

=== Men's league ===
Multiple winners (1991–present)
League	Wins	Years
Spain	13	2000, 2001, 2002, 2004, 2010, 2011, 2012, 2013, 2014, 2015, 2016, 2017, 2018
Italy	13	1991, 1992, 1993, 1994, 1995, 1996, 1998, 1999, 2003, 2006, 2020, 2023, 2024
England	6	2005, 2007, 2008, 2009, 2019, 2025
Brazil	2	2021, 2022
Germany	1	1997

=== The Strongest National League of the Decade ===
Decade	World	Europe	South America	CONCACAF	Africa	Asia	Oceania
2001–2010	England	England	Brazil	Mexico	Egypt	Japan	New Zealand
2011–2020	Spain	Spain	Brazil	Mexico	Tunisia	South Korea	New Zealand

=== Women's league ===
Year	League
2020	England
2021	France
2022	Spain
2023	Spain

== The World's Best Player ==
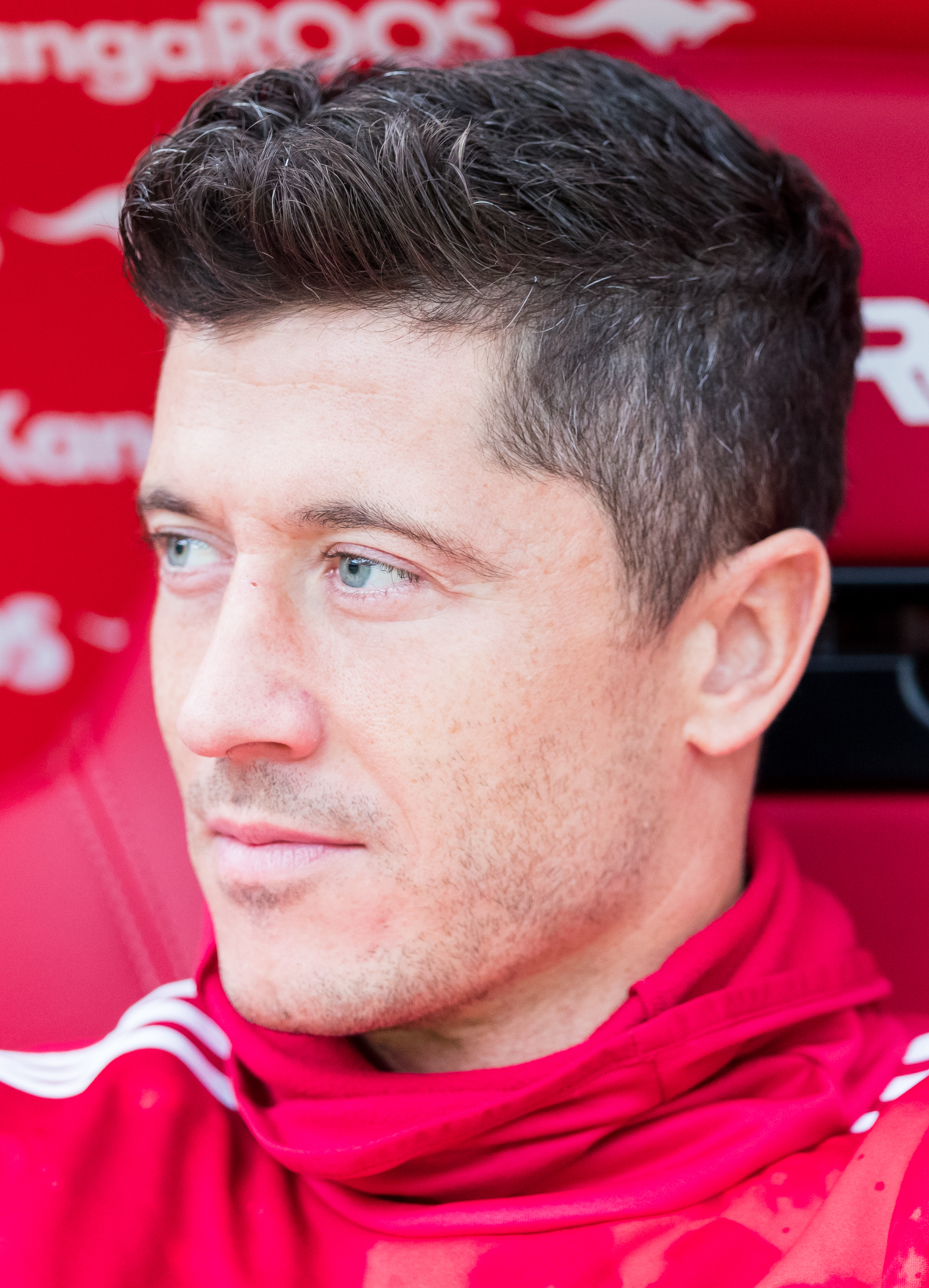
Robert Lewandowski won the Best Player award in 2020 and 2021.

=== Men's winners ===
From 1991 until 2009, FIFA continued this distinction named FIFA World Player of the Year; this award was later replaced by the FIFA Ballon d'Or in 2010, and The Best FIFA Men's Player in 2016. The award was reinstated in 2020.

Winners (1988–1990, 2020–present)
Player	Wins	Years
(Netherlands) Marco van Basten	2	1988, 1989
(Poland) Robert Lewandowski	2	2020, 2021
(Germany) Lothar Matthäus	1	1990
(Argentina) Lionel Messi	1	2022
(Norway) Erling Haaland	1	2023
(Spain) Rodri	1	2024
(France) Ousmane Dembélé	1	2025

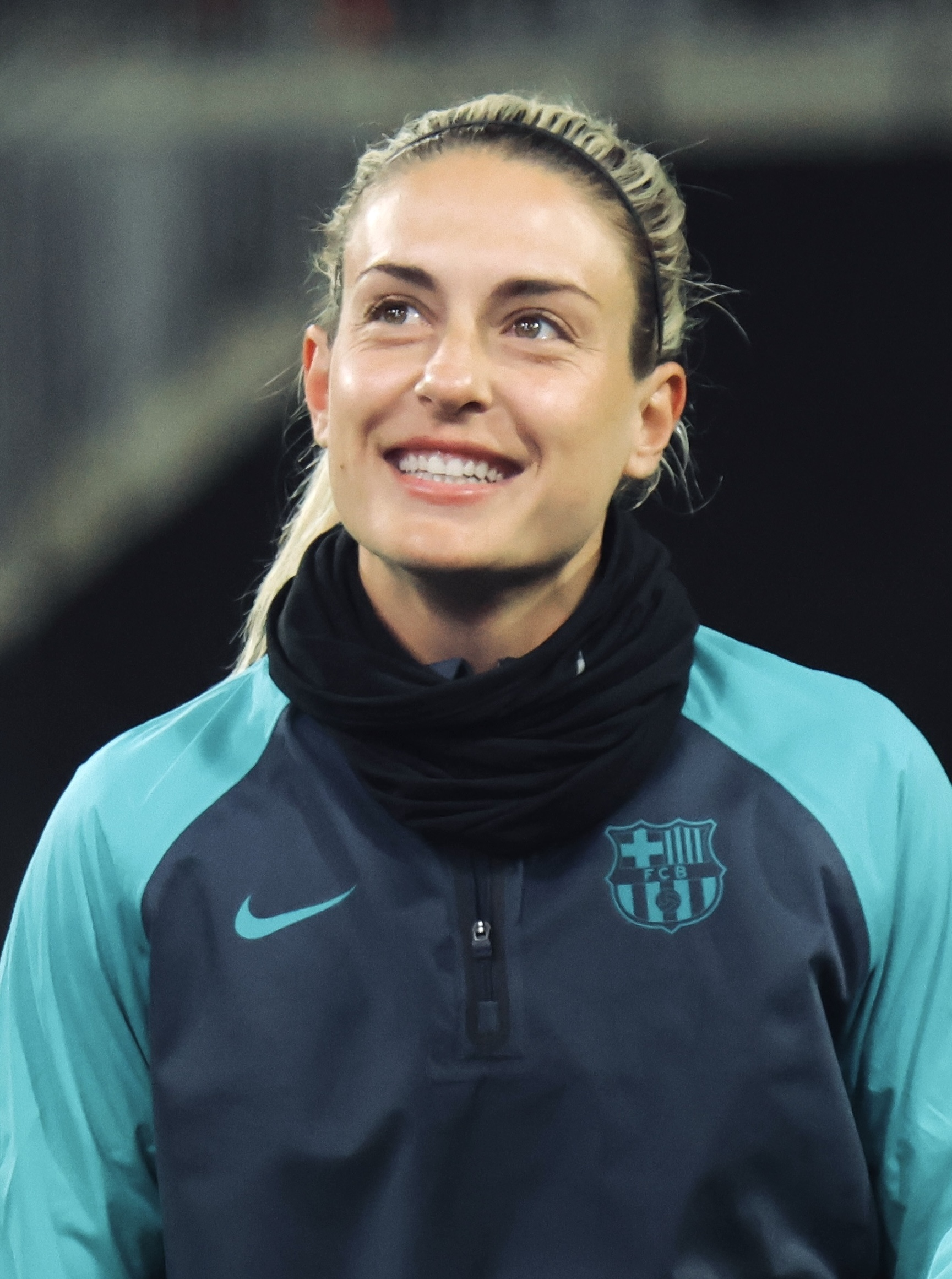
Alexia Putellas won the Best Player award in 2021 and 2022.

=== Women's winners ===
Winners (2020–present)
Player	Wins	Years
(Spain) Aitana Bonmatí	3	2023, 2024, 2025
(Spain) Alexia Putellas	2	2021, 2022
(Denmark) Pernille Harder	1	2020

=== The World's Best Man Player of the Century (1901–2000) ===
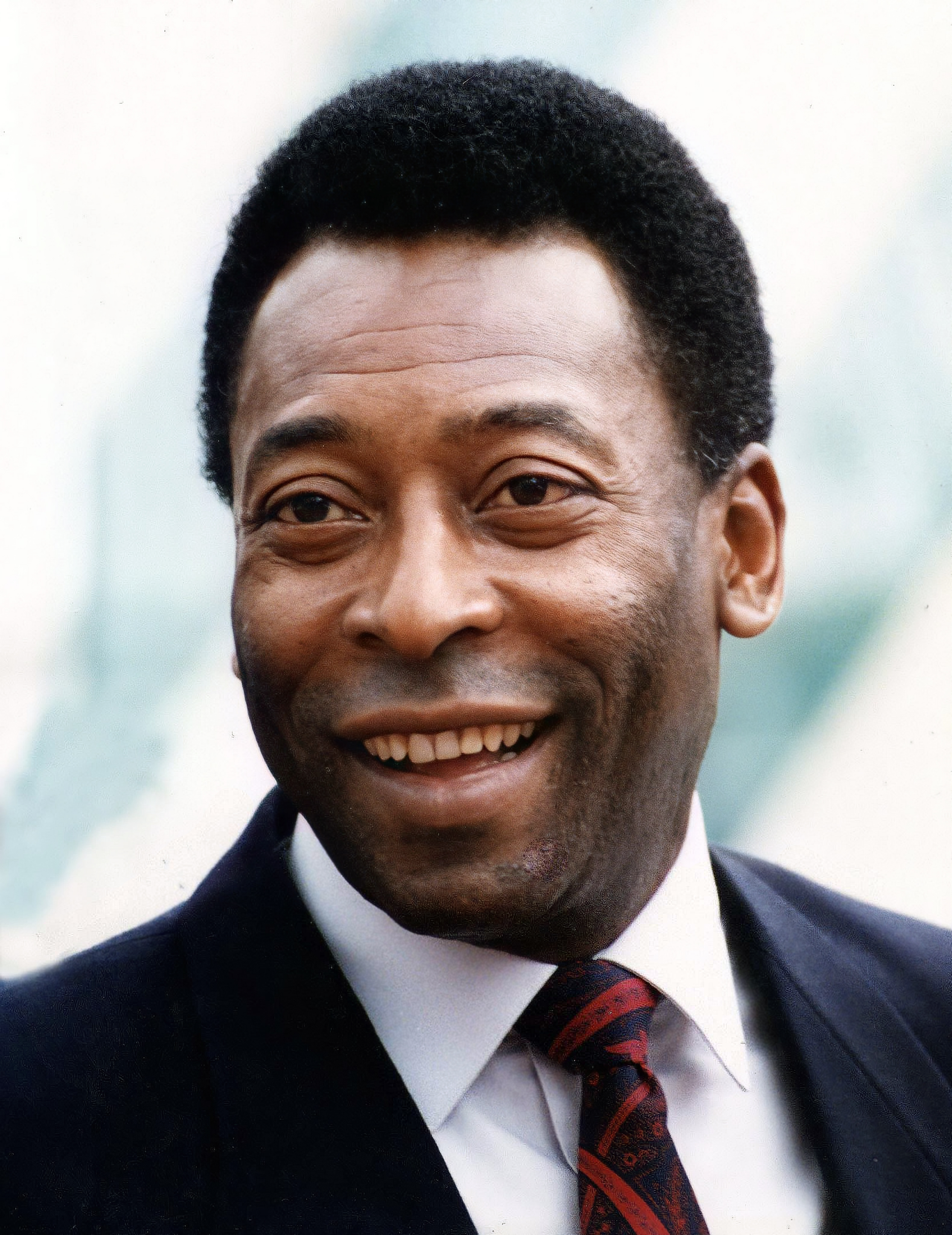
Pelé, Male Player of the Century (1901–2000)

Top 10 players
Rank	Player	Nationality	Points
1	Pelé	Brazil	1705
2	Johan Cruyff	Netherlands	1303
3	Franz Beckenbauer	West Germany	1228
4	Alfredo Di Stéfano	Argentina	1215
5	Diego Maradona	Argentina	1214
6	Ferenc Puskás	Hungary	810
7	Michel Platini	France	722
8	Garrincha	Brazil	624
9	Eusébio	Portugal	544
10	Bobby Charlton	England	508

=== The World's Best Woman Player of the Century (1901–2000) ===
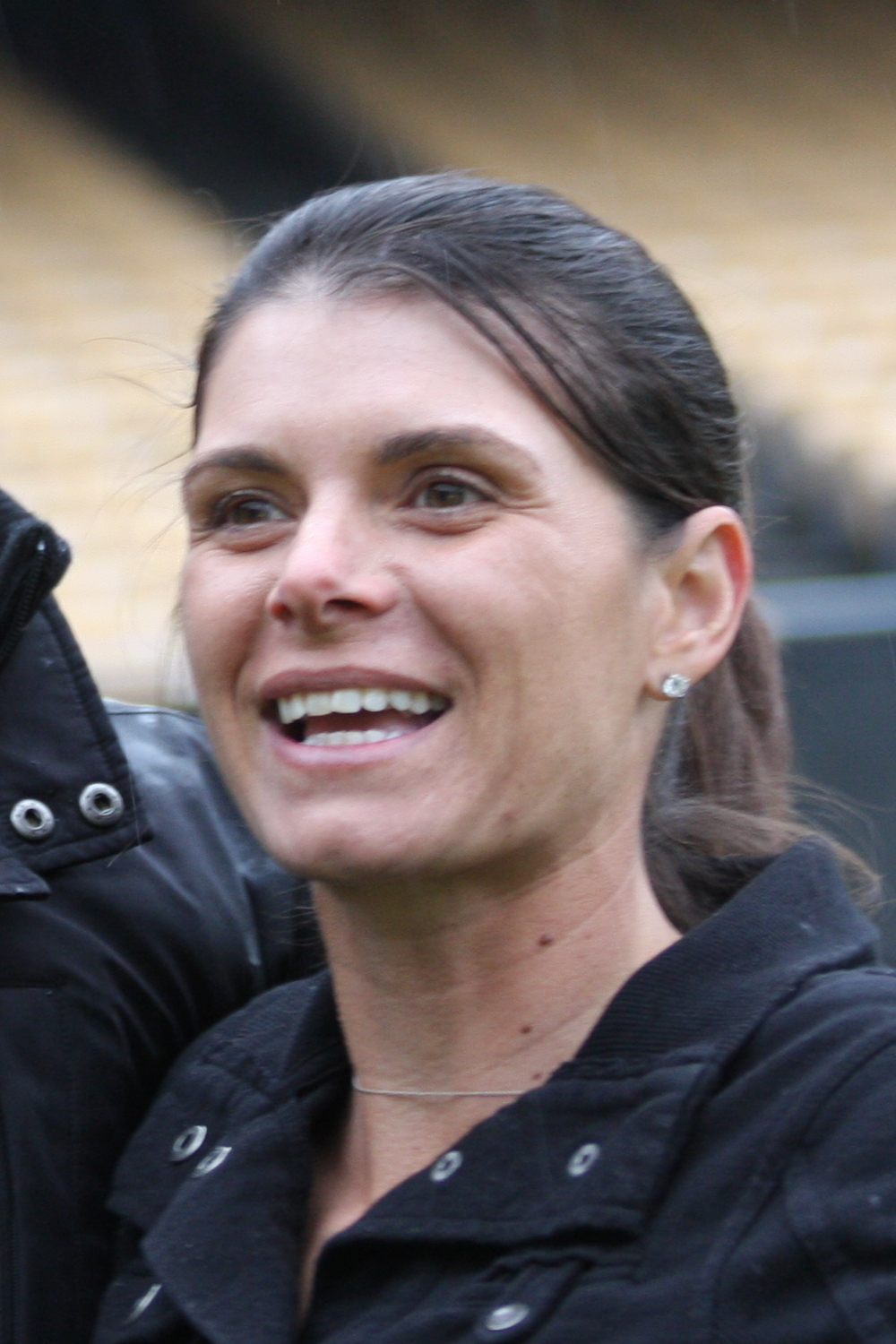
Mia Hamm, Female Player of the Century (1901–2000)

IFFHS gave out an award decided by votes which was conducted with the participation of journalists and former players (no further details given).

Top 10 players
Rank	Player	Nationality	Points
1	Mia Hamm	United States	442
2	Michelle Akers	United States	411
3	Heidi Mohr	Germany	250
4	Carolina Morace	Italy	230
5	Sissi	Brazil	212
6	Linda Medalen	Norway	181
7	Liu Ailing	China	165
8	Kristine Lilly	United States	160
9	Heidi Støre	Norway	141
10	Pia Sundhage	Sweden	129

=== The World's Best Man Player of the 19th Century (until 1900) ===
In November 2021, IFFHS announced the Dream Team of the 19th Century and the top 3 players.

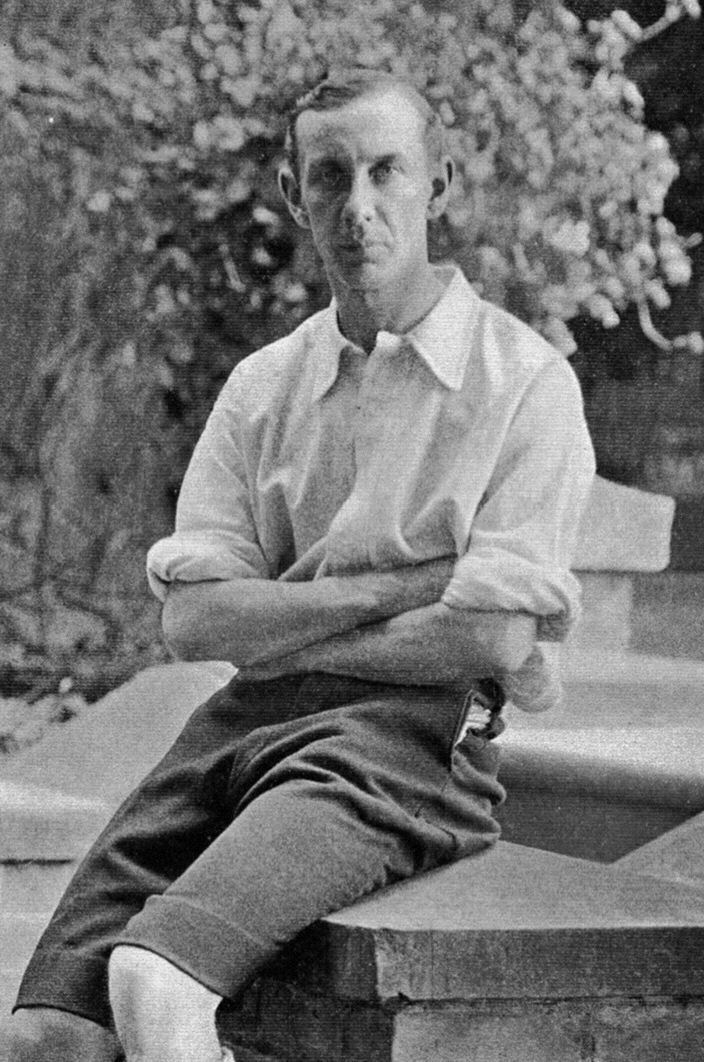
Gilbert Oswald Smith, Male Player of the 19th Century

Top 3 players
Rank	Player	Nationality
1	Gilbert Oswald Smith	England
2	John Goodall	England
3	Steve Bloomer	England

=== Top 10 Players of All Time (2025) ===
In May 2025, IFFHS announced the top 10 players of all time, based on performance statistics, with Lionel Messi being the winner surpassing Pelé, the IFFHS Player of the 20th Century.

Top 10 players
Rank	Player	Nationality
1	Lionel Messi	Argentina
2	Pelé	Brazil
3	Diego Maradona	Argentina
4	Cristiano Ronaldo	Portugal
5	Johan Cruyff	Netherlands
6	Ronaldo	Brazil
7	Zinedine Zidane	France
8	Franz Beckenbauer	Germany
9	Alfredo Di Stéfano	Argentina
10	Ronaldinho	Brazil

== World's Best Player and Coach ==
It was a one-time award under the name world's universal genius won by Franz Beckenbauer for his world success as both player and coach in 2007.

	Player	Nationality
2007	Franz Beckenbauer	West Germany

== World's Most Popular Player ==
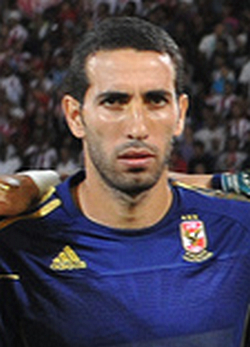
Mohamed Aboutrika won World's most popular player award 3 times.

The World‘s most popular player as voted by IFFHS users:

Year	Player	Nationality	Club	Votes
2006	Steven Gerrard	England	Liverpool	47,464
2007	Mohamed Aboutrika	Egypt	Al Ahly	1,017,786
2008	Mohamed Aboutrika	Egypt	Al Ahly	301,837
2009	Mohamed Aboutrika	Egypt	Al Ahly	84,470

== Europe's Best Player ==
=== Best European Player (1956–1989) ===
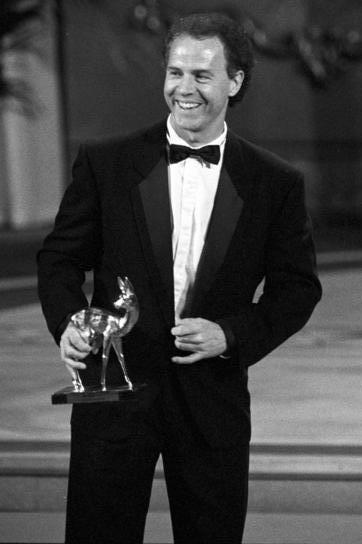
Franz Beckenbauer, Best European Player (1956–1989)

On 24 April 1990, ahead of the 1990 FIFA World Cup, IFFHS gave out an award for the best European player, taking into consideration players who were voted in the shortlist of the France Football's Ballon D'Or from 1956 until 1989.

Rank	Player	Nationality
1	Franz Beckenbauer	West Germany
2	Michel Platini	France
3	Johan Cruyff	Netherlands
4	Eusébio	Portugal
5	Gerd Müller	West Germany
6	Karl-Heinz Rummenigge	West Germany
7	Luis Suárez	Spain
8	Bobby Charlton	England
9	Alfredo Di Stéfano	Spain
10	Raymond Kopa	France
11	Lev Yashin	Soviet Union
11	Gianni Rivera	Italy
11	Kevin Keegan	England
14	John Charles	Wales
15	Marco van Basten	Netherlands
16	Ferenc Puskás	Hungary
16	Bernd Schuster	West Germany
16	George Best	Northern Ireland
19	Ruud Gullit	Netherlands
20	Preben Elkjær	Denmark

=== European Player of the Century (1901–2000) ===
Top 10 players
Rank	Player	Nationality	Points
1	Johan Cruyff	Netherlands	756
2	Franz Beckenbauer	West Germany	709
3	Alfredo Di Stéfano	Spain	708
4	Ferenc Puskás	Hungary	667
5	Michel Platini	France	505
6	Eusébio	Portugal	379
7	Bobby Charlton	England	303
8	Stanley Matthews	England	282
9	Gerd Müller	West Germany	249
10	Marco van Basten	Netherlands	240

=== European Player of Decade (2011–2020) ===
On 2 February 2021, IFFHS announced the best European players (UEFA) of the decade.

Rank	Player	Nationality
1	Cristiano Ronaldo	Portugal
2	Sergio Ramos	Spain
3	Manuel Neuer	Germany

== South America's Best Player ==
=== South American Player of the Century (1901–2000) ===
Top 10 players
Rank	Player	Nationality	Points
1	Pelé	Brazil	220
2	Diego Maradona	Argentina	193
3	Alfredo Di Stéfano	Argentina	161
4	Garrincha	Brazil	142
5	José Manuel Moreno	Argentina	82
6	Juan Alberto Schiaffino	Uruguay	52
7	Zico	Brazil	51
8	Arsenio Erico	Paraguay	42
8	Elías Figueroa	Chile	42
10	Zizinho	Brazil	40

=== South American Player of Decade (2011–2020) ===
On 2 February 2021, IFFHS announced the best South American players (CONMEBOL) of the decade.

Rank	Player	Nationality
1	Lionel Messi	Argentina
2	Neymar	Brazil
3	Dani Alves	Brazil

== CONCACAF Best Player ==
=== CONCACAF Player of the Century (1901–2000) ===
Top 10 players
Rank	Player	Nationality	Points
1	Hugo Sánchez	Mexico	107
2	Luis de la Fuente	Mexico	45
3	Carlos Hermosillo	Mexico	42
4	Horacio Casarín	Mexico	40
5	Raúl Cárdenas	Mexico	39
6	Billy Gonsalves	United States	33
7	Salvador Reyes	Mexico	30
8	Bruce Wilson	Canada	29
8	Julio Dely Valdés	Panama	29
10	Mágico González	El Salvador	24

=== Player of Decade (2011–2020) ===
On 5 February 2021, IFFHS announced the best CONCACAF players of the decade.

Rank	Player	Nationality
1	Keylor Navas	Costa Rica
2	Javier Hernández	Mexico
3	Clint Dempsey	United States

== Africa's Best Player ==
=== African Player of the Century (1901–2000) ===
Top 10 players
Rank	Player	Nationality	Points
1	George Weah	Liberia	95
2	Roger Milla	Cameroon	77
3	Abedi Pele	Ghana	72
4	Lakhdar Belloumi	Algeria	56
5	Rabah Madjer	Algeria	51
6	Théophile Abega	Cameroon	39
7	Laurent Pokou	Ivory Coast	38
8	François Omam-Biyik	Cameroon	37
9	Ahmed Faras	Morocco	35
10	Finidi George	Nigeria	32

=== Player of Decade (2011–2020) ===
On 5 February 2021, IFFHS announced the best African players (CAF) of the decade.

Rank	Player	Nationality
1	Mohamed Salah	Egypt
2	Sadio Mané	Senegal
3	Riyad Mahrez	Algeria

== Asia's Best Player ==
=== Asian Player of the Century (1901–2000) ===
Top 10 players
Rank	Player	Nationality	Points
1	Cha Bum-kun	South Korea	112
2	Kim Joo-sung	South Korea	93
3	Majed Abdullah	Saudi Arabia	87
4	Kazuyoshi Miura	Japan	71
5	Kunishige Kamamoto	Japan	70
6	Saeed Al-Owairan	Saudi Arabia	68
7	Ali Daei	Iran	64
8	Khodadad Azizi	Iran	59
9	Ahmed Radhi	Iraq	48
10	Karim Bagheri	Iran	47

=== Player of Decade (2011–2020) ===
On 5 February 2021, IFFHS announced the best Asian players (AFC) of the decade.

Rank	Player	Nationality
1	Son Heung-min	South Korea
2	Keisuke Honda	Japan
3	Salem Al-Dawsari	Saudi Arabia

== Oceania's Best Player ==
=== OFC Player of the Century (1901–2000) ===
Top 10 players
Rank	Player	Nationality	Points
1	Wynton Rufer	New Zealand	62
2	Frank Farina	Australia	41
3	Christian Karembeu (Note: Represented France internationally.)	New Caledonia	40
4	Joe Marston	Australia	34
5	John Kosmina	Australia	33
6	Alan Davidson	Australia	22
7	Robert Slater	Australia	17
7	Paul Okon	Australia	17
9	Reg Date	Australia	14
10	Eddie Krncevic	Australia	13

=== Player of Decade (2011–2020) ===
On 6 February 2021, IFFHS announced the best Oceanian players (OFC) of the decade.

Rank	Player	Nationality
1	Chris Wood	New Zealand
2	Winston Reid	New Zealand
3	Marco Rojas	New Zealand

== The World's Best Youth (U20) Player ==
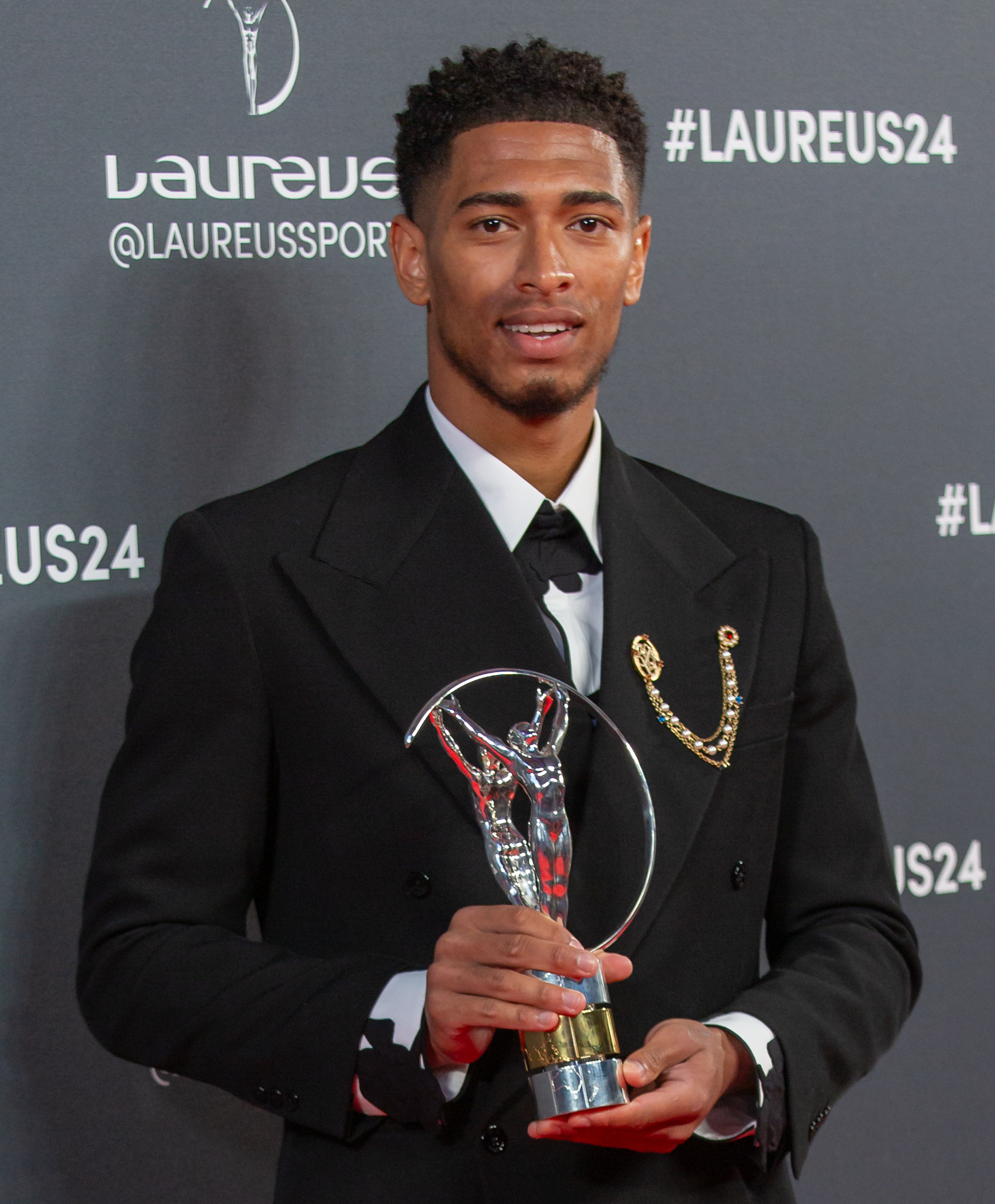
Jude Bellingham won the Men's World Best Youth (U20) Player award twice.

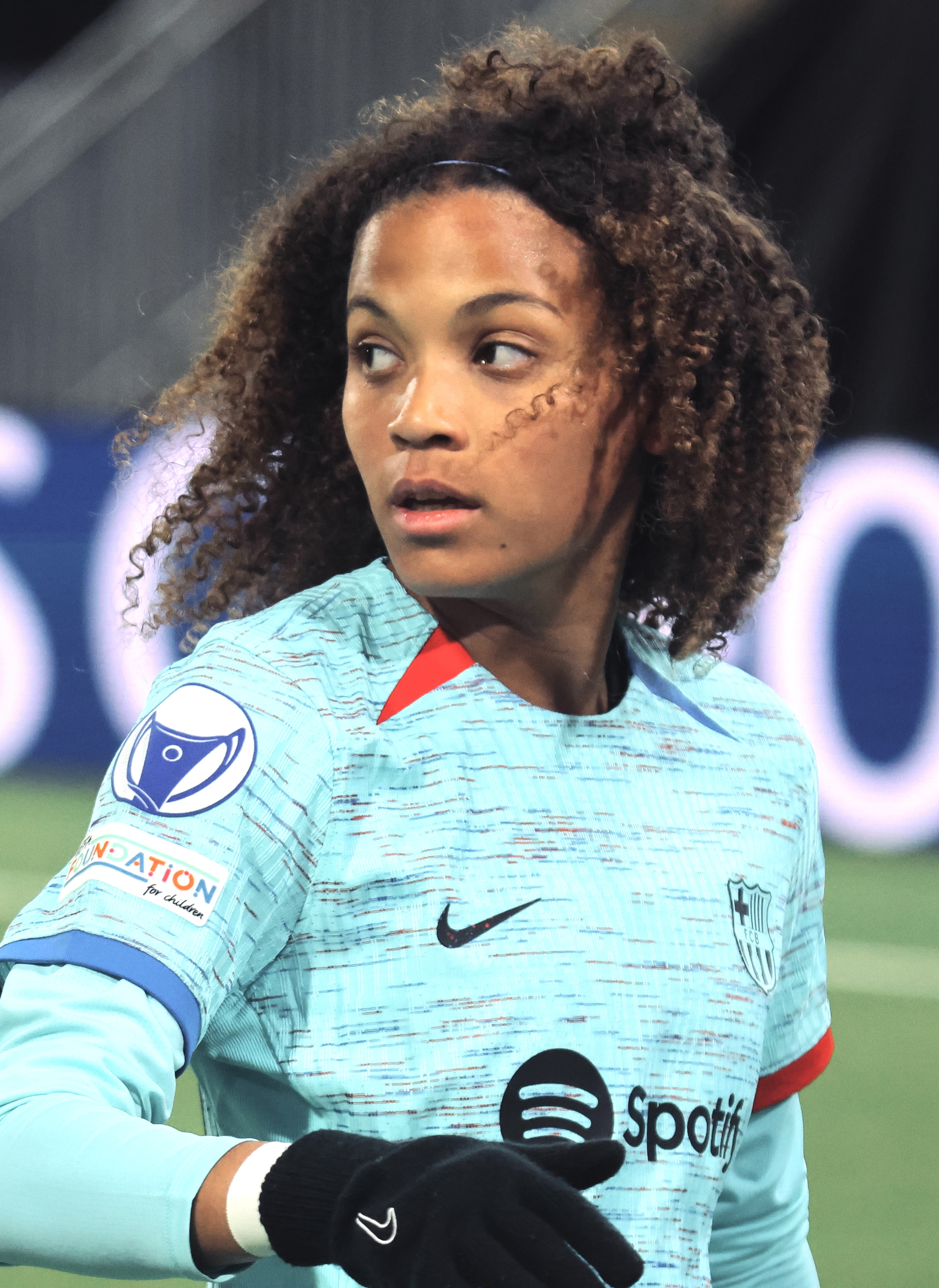
Vicky López won the Women's World Best Youth (U20) Player award twice.

The award was introduced in 2021.

=== Men's winners ===
Year	Winner	Club(s)
2021	(Spain) Pedri	(Spain) Barcelona
2022	(England) Jude Bellingham	(Germany) Borussia Dortmund
2023	(England) Jude Bellingham	(Germany) Borussia Dortmund (Spain) Real Madrid
2024	(Spain) Lamine Yamal	(Spain) Barcelona
2025	(Spain) Lamine Yamal	(Spain) Barcelona

=== Women's winners ===
Year	Winner	Club(s)
2021	(Sweden) Hanna Bennison	(Sweden) FC Rosengård (England) Everton
2022	(Colombia) Linda Caicedo	(Colombia) Deportivo Cali
2023	(Spain) Salma Paralluelo	(Spain) Barcelona
2024	(Spain) Vicky López	(Spain) Barcelona
2025	(Spain) Vicky López	(Spain) Barcelona

== The World's Best Playmaker ==
=== Men's winners ===
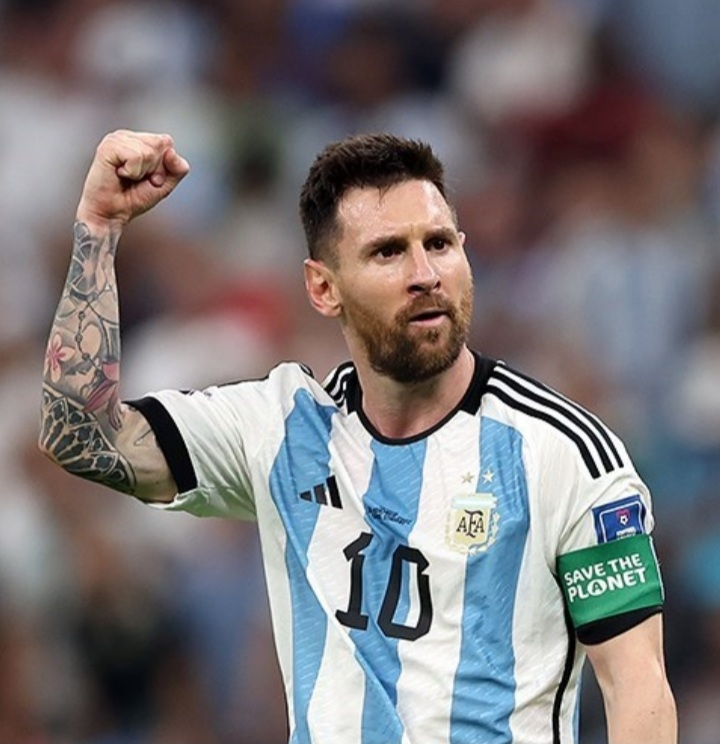
Lionel Messi has won a record five IFFHS best playmaker awards.

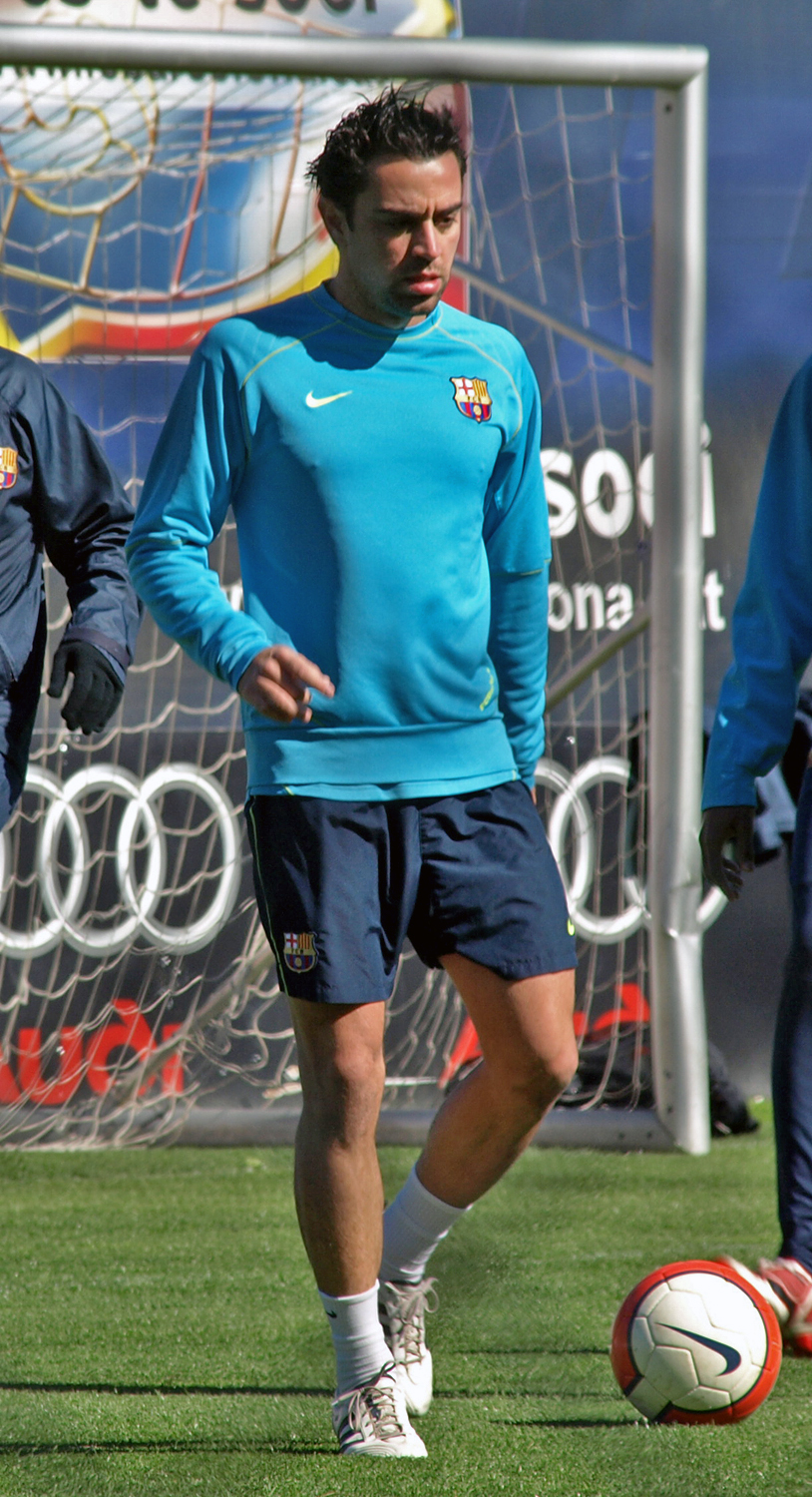
Xavi won the award a record four consecutive years.

The IFFHS World's Best Playmaker is a footballing award which, since 2006, is given annually to the best playmaker of the year, as chosen by the International Federation of Football History & Statistics (IFFHS). The award is awarded at the end of the year at the World Football Gala: the winning playmaker is awarded a gold trophy. Argentina's Lionel Messi has won the award a record five times. Spain's Xavi won the award four times, all consecutively, while Belgian Kevin De Bruyne won the award three times. Barcelona is the club with the most wins, with ten in total. Lionel Messi was named the Best Playmaker since 2006 and the Best Playmaker of the Decade 2011–2020.

Year	Winner	Club(s)
2006	(France) Zinedine Zidane	(Spain) Real Madrid
2007	(Brazil) Kaká	(Italy) Milan
2008	(Spain) Xavi	(Spain) Barcelona
2009	(Spain) Xavi	(Spain) Barcelona
2010	(Spain) Xavi	(Spain) Barcelona
2011	(Spain) Xavi	(Spain) Barcelona
2012	(Spain) Andrés Iniesta	(Spain) Barcelona
2013	(Spain) Andrés Iniesta	(Spain) Barcelona
2014	(Germany) Toni Kroos	(Germany) Bayern Munich (Spain) Real Madrid
2015	(Argentina) Lionel Messi	(Spain) Barcelona
2016	(Argentina) Lionel Messi	(Spain) Barcelona
2017	(Argentina) Lionel Messi	(Spain) Barcelona
2018	(Croatia) Luka Modrić	(Spain) Real Madrid
2019	(Argentina) Lionel Messi	(Spain) Barcelona
2020	(Belgium) Kevin De Bruyne	(England) Manchester City
2021	(Belgium) Kevin De Bruyne	(England) Manchester City
2022	(Argentina) Lionel Messi	(France) Paris Saint-Germain
2023	(Belgium) Kevin De Bruyne	(England) Manchester City
2024	(England) Jude Bellingham	(Spain) Real Madrid
2025	(Portugal) Vitinha	(France) Paris Saint-Germain

Multiple winners (2006–present)
Player	Wins	Years
(Argentina) Lionel Messi	5	2015, 2016, 2017, 2019, 2022
(Spain) Xavi	4	2008, 2009, 2010, 2011
(Belgium) Kevin De Bruyne	3	2020, 2021, 2023
(Spain) Andrés Iniesta	2	2012, 2013

=== All-time Men's Best Playmaker ranking (2006-2022) ===
As of 31 December 2022

Top 10 players
Rank	Player	Nation	Points
1	Lionel Messi	Argentina	284
2	Andrés Iniesta	Spain	197
3	Kevin De Bruyne	Belgium	141
4	Luka Modrić	Croatia	133
5	Xavi	Spain	130
6	Toni Kroos	Germany	101
7	Mesut Özil	Germany	85
8	Andrea Pirlo	Italy	82
9	Eden Hazard	Belgium	77
10	Neymar	Brazil	71

=== Women's winners ===
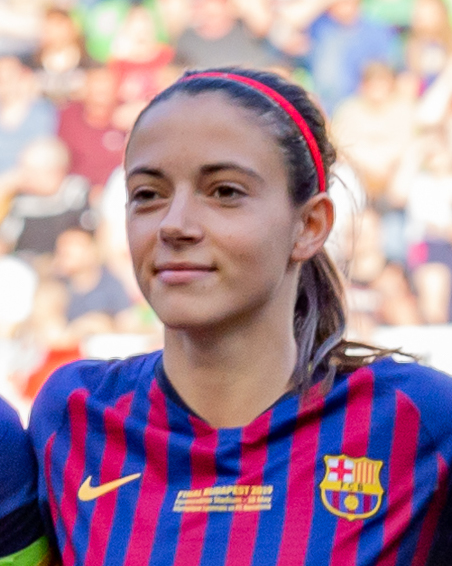
Aitana Bonmatí was named Best Playmaker a record three consecutive years.

Dzsenifer Marozsán was named the Best Playmaker since 2006 and the Best Playmaker of the Decade 2011–2020.

Year	Winner	Club(s)
2012	(Brazil) Marta	(Sweden) Tyresö FF
2013	(Germany) Lena Goeßling	(Germany) VfL Wolfsburg
2014	(Germany) Nadine Keßler	(Germany) VfL Wolfsburg
2015	(United States) Carli Lloyd	(United States) Houston Dash
2016	(Germany) Dzsenifer Marozsán	(France) Lyon
2017	(Netherlands) Lieke Martens	(Sweden) FC Rosengård (Spain) Barcelona
2018	(Germany) Dzsenifer Marozsán	(France) Lyon
2019	(United States) Megan Rapinoe	(United States) Reign FC
2020	(Germany) Dzsenifer Marozsán	(France) Lyon
2021	(Spain) Alexia Putellas	(Spain) Barcelona
2022	(Spain) Alexia Putellas	(Spain) Barcelona
2023	(Spain) Aitana Bonmatí	(Spain) Barcelona
2024	(Spain) Aitana Bonmatí	(Spain) Barcelona
2025	(Spain) Aitana Bonmatí	(Spain) Barcelona

== The World's Best Goalkeeper ==
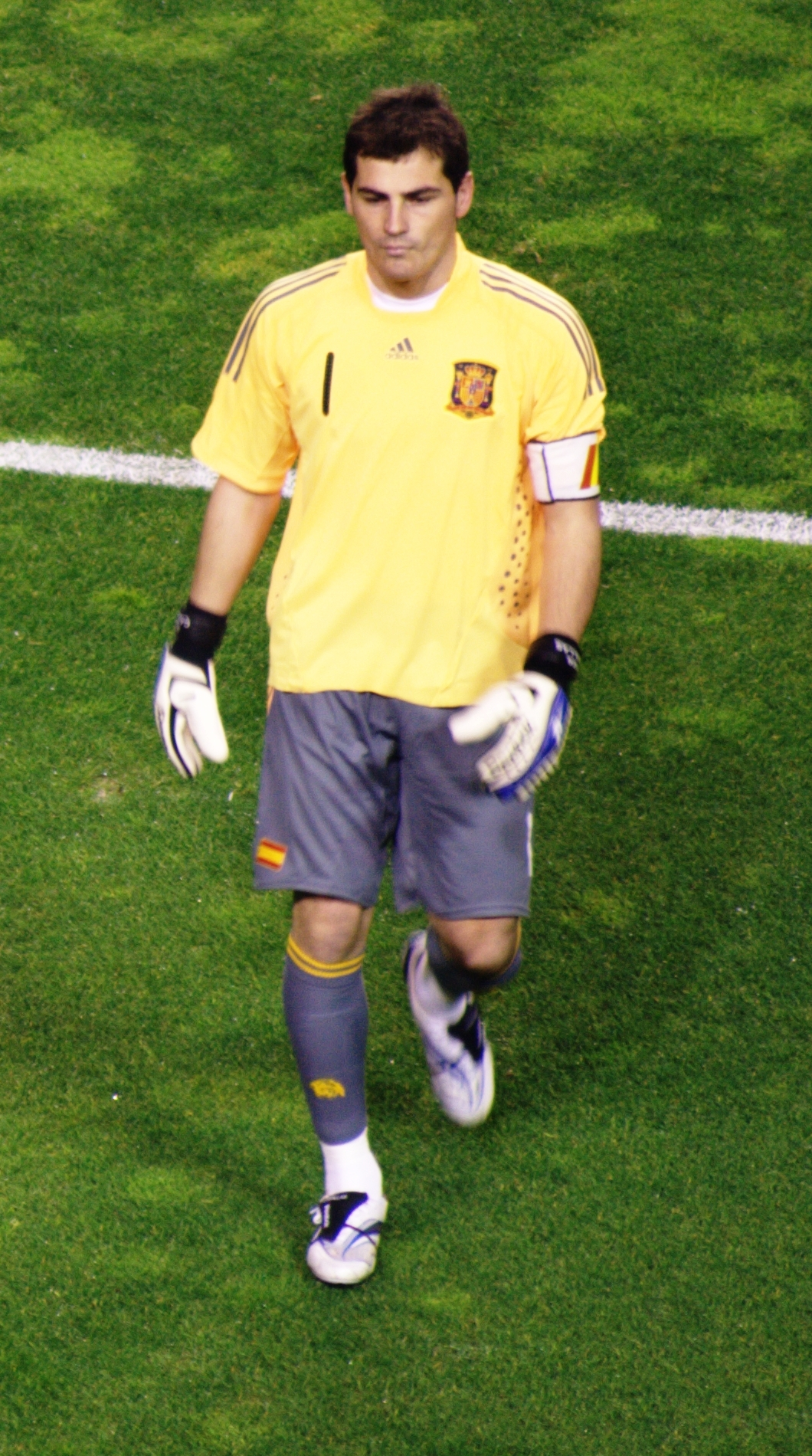
Spanish goalkeeper Iker Casillas is tied with Gianluigi Buffon and Manuel Neuer (5), with a record five consecutive wins between 2008 and 2012.

=== Men's winners ===
Multiple winners (1987–present)
Player	Wins	Years
(Spain) Iker Casillas	5	2008, 2009, 2010, 2011, 2012
(Italy) Gianluigi Buffon	5	2003, 2004, 2006, 2007, 2017
(Germany) Manuel Neuer	5	2013, 2014, 2015, 2016, 2020
(Italy) Walter Zenga	3	1989, 1990, 1991
(Paraguay) José Luis Chilavert	3	1995, 1997, 1998
(Germany) Oliver Kahn	3	1999, 2001, 2002
(Denmark) Peter Schmeichel	2	1992, 1993
(Belgium) Thibaut Courtois	2	2018, 2022
(Italy) Gianluigi Donnarumma	2	2021, 2025

=== Women's winners ===
Multiple winners (2012–present)
Player	Wins	Years
(United States) Hope Solo	4	2012, 2013, 2014, 2015
(France) Sarah Bouhaddi	4	2016, 2017, 2018, 2020
(Chile) Christiane Endler	2	2021, 2022

== The World's Best Top Goal Scorer ==
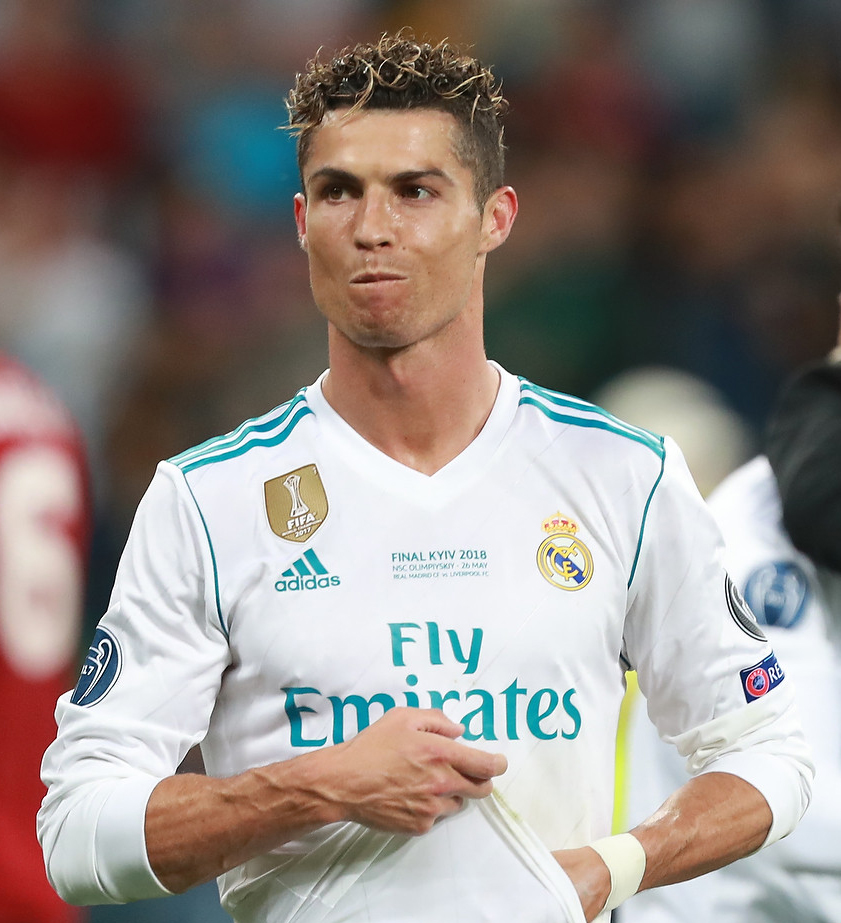
Cristiano Ronaldo has been the Top Goal Scorer of the Year a record five times. He is also the Best Goal Scorer in History.

This award is given annually since 2020, and retroactively from 2011 to 2019, to the world's top goalscorer in the calendar year.

=== Men's winners ===
Multiple winners (2010*–present)
Player	Wins	Years
(Portugal) Cristiano Ronaldo	5	2011, 2013, 2014, 2015, 2023
(Argentina) Lionel Messi	2	2012, 2016
(Poland) Robert Lewandowski	2	2020, 2021
(France) Kylian Mbappé	2	2022, 2025

=== All-time World's Best Goal Scorer ranking ===
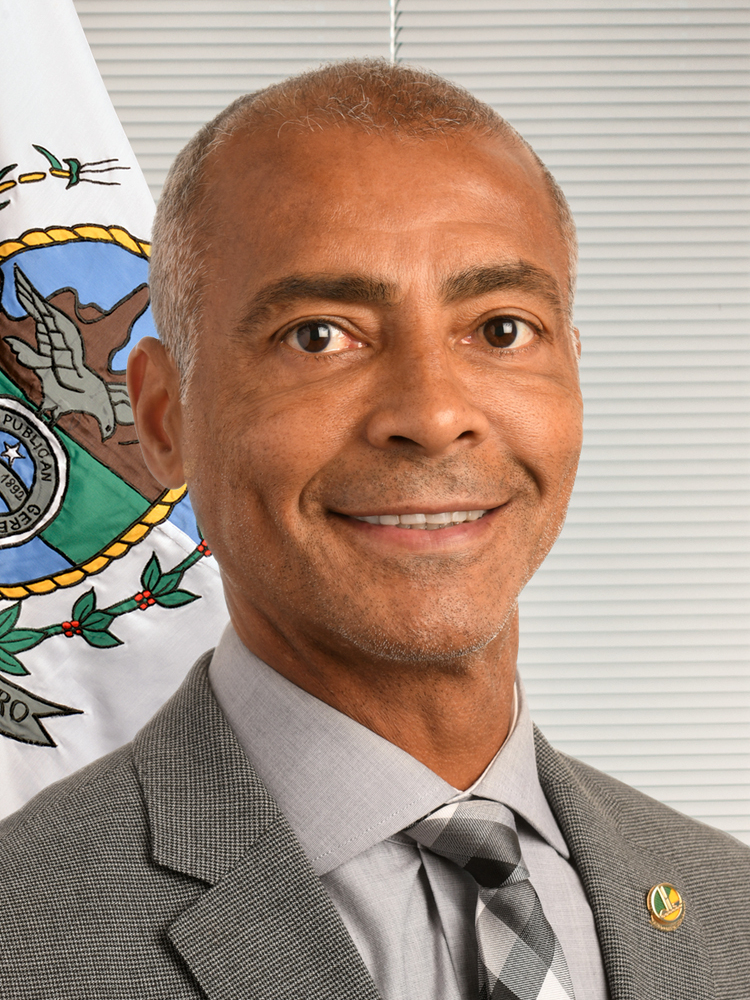
Romário ranks 4th in the All-time World's Best Goal Scorer ranking with 756 goals.

As of 2 November 2026
Bold indicates players currently active.

Top 10 goal scorers of all-time
Rank	Player	Goals
1	(Portugal) **Cristiano Ronaldo**	985
2	(Argentina) **Lionel Messi**	937
3	(Brazil) Pelé	762
4	(Brazil) Romário	756
5	(Hungary) (Spain) Ferenc Puskás	725
6	(Austria) (Czechoslovakia) Josef Bican	722
7	(Poland) **Robert Lewandowski**	708
8	(Northern Ireland) Jimmy Jones	639
9	(Germany) Gerd Müller	634
10	(Northern Ireland) Joe Bambrick	626

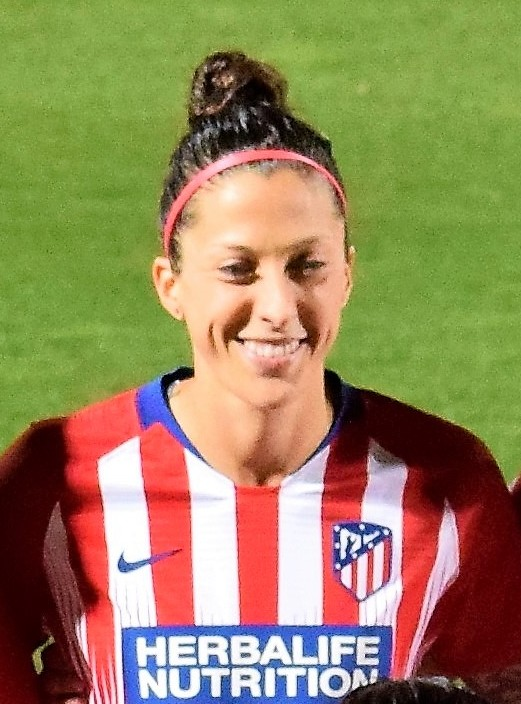
Jenni Hermoso scored 48 goals in 2021.

=== Women's winners ===
The women's award was introduced in 2021.

Year	Winner	Club	Goals
2021	(Spain) Jennifer Hermoso	(Spain) Barcelona	48
2022	(Netherlands) Fenna Kalma	(Netherlands) Twente	45
2023	(Malawi) Temwa Chawinga	(China) Wuhan Jianghan	63
2024	(Mexico) Charlyn Corral	(Mexico) Pachuca	44
2025	(Mexico) Charlyn Corral	(Mexico) Pachuca	57

== The World's Best International Goal Scorer ==
This award is given annually since 1991 to the world's top international goalscorer in the calendar year.

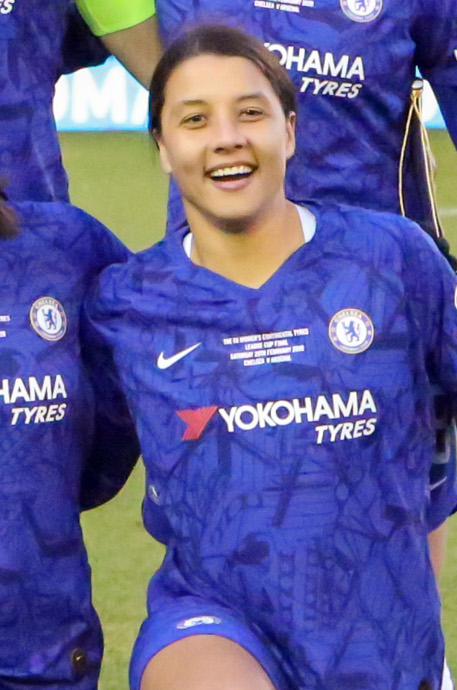
Sam Kerr scored 12 goals for her country in 2022.

=== Men's winners ===
Multiple winners (1991–present)
Player	Wins	Years
(Portugal) Cristiano Ronaldo	5	2013, 2014, 2016, 2017, 2019
(Argentina) Lionel Messi	3	2011, 2012, 2022
(Iran) Ali Daei	2	1996, 2004
(Poland) Robert Lewandowski	2	2015, 2021
(Belgium) Romelu Lukaku	2	2020, 2023

=== Women's winners ===
The women's award was introduced in 2021.

Year	Winner	Club	Goals
2021	(England) Ellen White	(England) Manchester City	21
2022	(Australia) Sam Kerr	(England) Chelsea	17
2023	(Zambia) Barbra Banda	(China) Shanghai Shengli	15
2024	(Germany) Lea Schüller	(Germany) Bayern Munich	14
2025	(Spain) Claudia Pina	(Spain) Barcelona	18

== The World's Best Top Division Goal Scorer ==
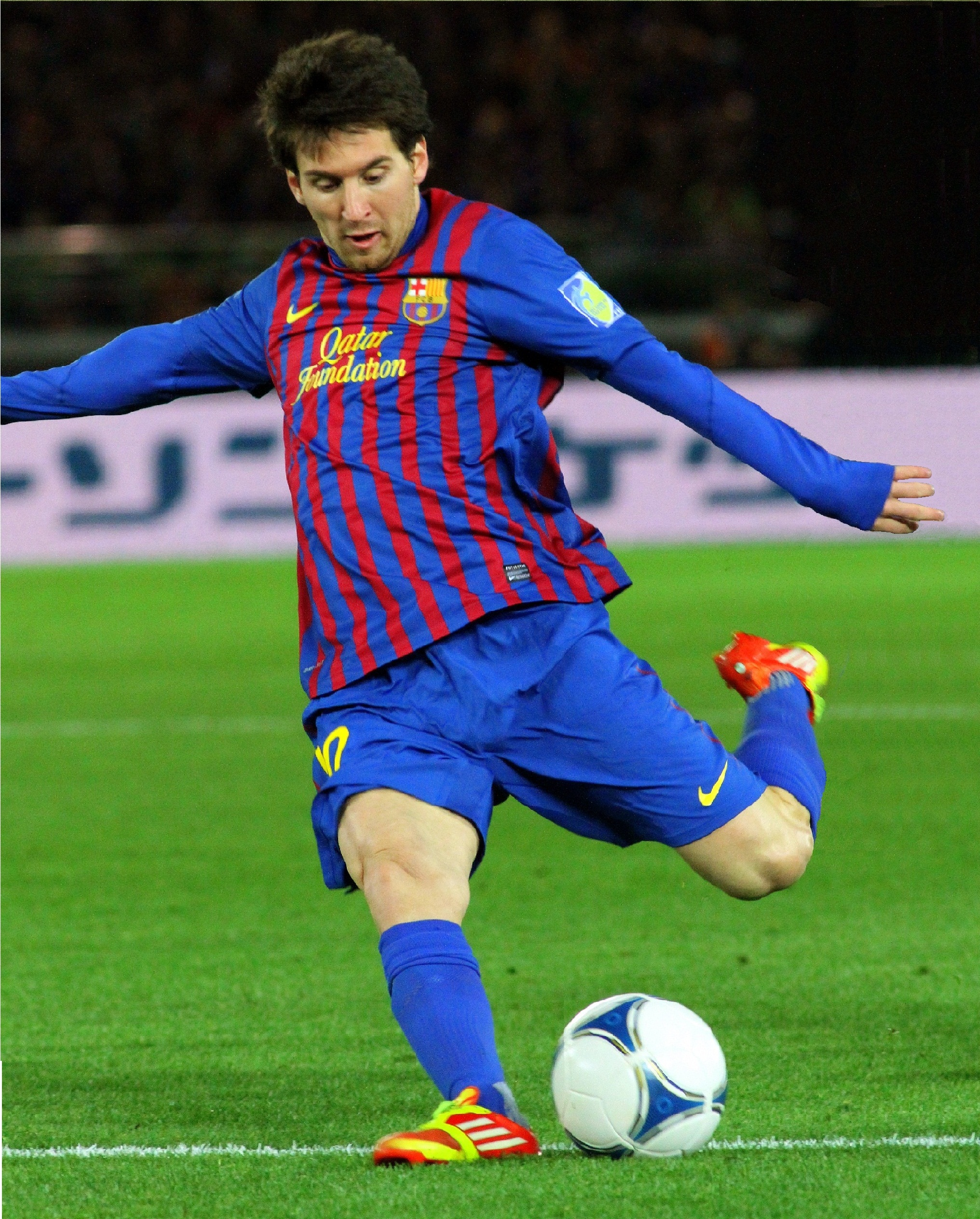
Lionel Messi has won the award a record four times.

This award is given annually since 1997 to the player who scores the most goals in a league season (in a calendar year since 2020) in any of the top 60 leagues in the world (as ranked by IFFHS for that given year).

=== Men's winners ===
Year	Winner	Club(s)	Goals
1997	(Turkey) Hakan Şükür	(Turkey) Galatasaray	38
1998	(Ecuador) Iván Kaviedes	(Ecuador) Emelec	43
1999	(Brazil) Mário Jardel	(Portugal) Porto	36
2000	(Brazil) Mário Jardel	(Portugal) Porto	38
2001	(Bolivia) José Alfredo Castillo	(Bolivia) Oriente Petrolero	42
2002	(Bolivia) Joaquín Botero	(Bolivia) Bolívar	49
2003	(Paraguay) José Cardozo	(Mexico) Toluca	58
2004	(Chile) Patricio Galaz	(Chile) Cobreloa	42
2005	(Brazil) Clemerson Araújo	(Japan) Gamba Osaka	33
2006	(Netherlands) Klaas-Jan Huntelaar	(Netherlands) Ajax	35
2007	(Brazil) Afonso Alves	(Netherlands) Heerenveen	34
2008	(Paraguay) Lucas Barrios	(Chile) Colo-Colo	37
2009	(Austria) Marc Janko	(Austria) Red Bull Salzburg	39
2010	(Uruguay) Luis Suárez	(Netherlands) Ajax	35
2011	(Latvia) Aleksandrs Čekulajevs	(Estonia) Narva Trans	46
2012	(Argentina) Lionel Messi	(Spain) Barcelona	50
2013	(Argentina) Lionel Messi	(Spain) Barcelona	46
2014	(Portugal) Cristiano Ronaldo	(Spain) Real Madrid	31
2014	(Uruguay) Luis Suárez	(England) Liverpool	31
2015	(Portugal) Cristiano Ronaldo	(Spain) Real Madrid	48
2016	(Uruguay) Luis Suárez	(Spain) Barcelona	40
2017	(Argentina) Lionel Messi	(Spain) Barcelona	37
2018	(Argentina) Lionel Messi	(Spain) Barcelona	34
2018	(Brazil) Jonas	(Portugal) Benfica	34
2019	(Algeria) Baghdad Bounedjah	(Qatar) Al Sadd	39
Calendar year
2020	(Portugal) Cristiano Ronaldo	(Italy) Juventus	33
2021	(Poland) Robert Lewandowski	(Germany) Bayern Munich	43
2022	(Argentina) Germán Cano	(Brazil) Fluminense	33
2023	(England) Harry Kane	(England) Tottenham Hotspur (Germany) Bayern Munich	38
2024	(Sweden) Viktor Gyökeres	(Portugal) Sporting CP	36
2025	(France) Kylian Mbappé	(Spain) Real Madrid	39

Multiple winners (1997–present)
Player	Wins	Years
(Argentina) Lionel Messi	4	2012, 2013, 2017, 2018 (shared)
(Uruguay) Luis Suárez	3	2010, 2014 (shared), 2016
(Portugal) Cristiano Ronaldo	3	2014 (shared), 2015, 2020
(Brazil) Mário Jardel	2	1999, 2000

=== All-time World's Best Top Division Goal Scorer ranking ===
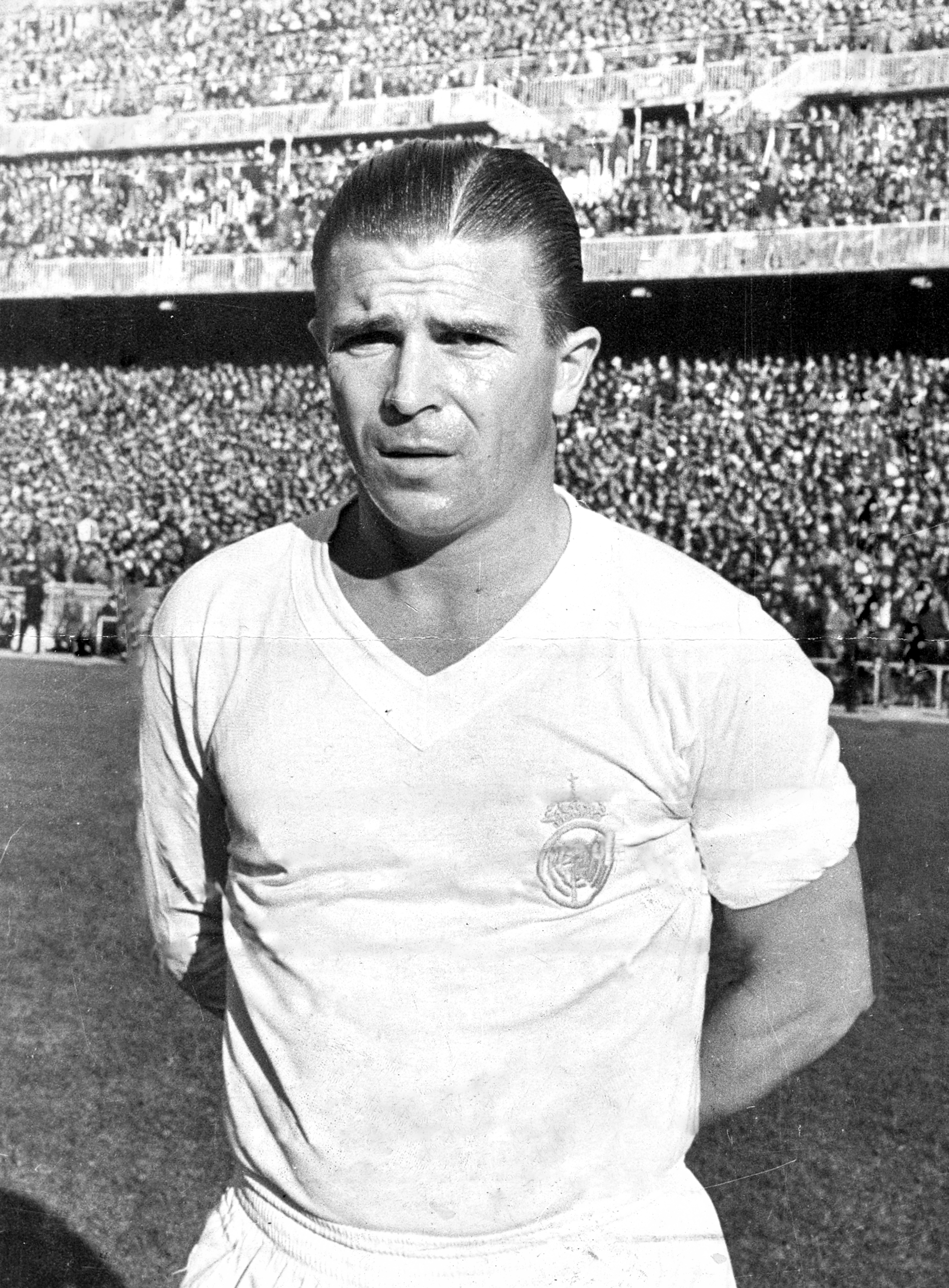
Ferenc Puskás

As of 1 August 2026
Bold indicates players currently active.

Top 10 top division goal scorers of all-time
Rank	Player	Goals
1	**(Portugal) Cristiano Ronaldo**	600
2	**(Argentina) Lionel Messi**	565
3	(Austria) (Czechoslovakia) Josef Bican	515
3	(Hungary) (Spain) Ferenc Puskás	515
5	(Poland) **Robert Lewandowski**	429
6	(Uruguay) **Luis Suárez**	428
7	(Hungary) Imre Schlosser	417
8	(Hungary) Gyula Zsengellér	416
9	(Scotland) Jimmy McGrory	409
10	(Germany) Gerd Müller	405

=== The World's Best Top Division Goal Scorer of the First Decade (2001–2010) ===
The final list includes the 18 players who scored 150 or more goals in top-tier national leagues in the period of time from 1 January 2001 to 31 December 2010. The results were posted on the IFFHS' official website on 25 September 2022.

Players with at least 180 goals
Rank	Player	Nation	Goals	Club(s)
1	Aleksandar Đurić	Singapore	246	Geylang United (2001–04); Singapore Armed Forces FC (2005–09); Tampines Rovers (2010)
2	Marc Lloyd Williams	Wales	236	(Wales) Bangor City (2001–02; 2003; 2006–07) (England) Southport (2002–03) (Wales) Aberystwyth Town (2003–04) (Wales) The New Saints (2004–06) (Wales) Newtown (2007–08) (Wales) Rhyl (2008) (Wales) Porthmadog (2008–09) (Wales) Airbus UK Broughton (2009–10)
3	Washington	Brazil	214	(Brazil) Ponte Preta (2001–02) (Turkey) Fenerbahçe (2002–03) (Brazil) Athletico Paranaense (2004) (Japan) Tokyo Verdy (2005) (Japan) Urawa Red Diamonds (2006–07) (Brazil) Fluminense (2008; 2010) (Brazil) São Paulo (2009–10)
4	Rhys Griffiths	Wales	198	(Wales) Cwmbrân Town (2001–02) (Wales) Haverfordwest County (2002–04) (Wales) Carmarthen Town (2004) (Wales) Port Talbot Town (2004–06) (Wales) Llanelli Town (2006–10)
5	Thierry Henry	France	182	(England) Arsenal (2001–07) (Spain) Barcelona (2007–10) (United States) New York Red Bulls (2010)
6	Magno Alves	Brazil	182	(Brazil) Fluminense (2001–02) (South Korea) Jeonbuk Hyundai Motors (2003) (Japan) Oita Trinita (2004–05) (Japan) Gamba Osaka (2006–07) (Saudi Arabia) Al-Ittihad (2007–08) (Qatar) Umm Salal (2008–10)
7	Maksim Gruznov	Estonia	180	(Estonia) Narva Trans (2001–08) (Estonia) Sillamäe Kalev (2009–10)

=== The World's Best Top Division Goal Scorer of the Second Decade (2011–2020) ===
The final list includes the 36 players who scored 150 or more goals in top-tier national leagues in the period of time from 1 January 2011 to 31 December 2020. The results were posted on the IFFHS' official website on 6 January 2021.

Players with at least 200 goals
Rank	Player	Nation	Goals	Club(s)
1	Lionel Messi	Argentina	346	(Spain) Barcelona (2011–20)
2	Cristiano Ronaldo	Portugal	332	(Spain) Real Madrid (2011–18) (Italy) Juventus (2018–20)
3	Robert Lewandowski	Poland	248	(Germany) Borussia Dortmund (2011–14) (Germany) Bayern Munich (2014–20)
4	Zlatan Ibrahimović	Sweden	236	(Italy) Milan (2011–12; 2019–20) (France) Paris Saint-Germain (2012–16) (England) Manchester United (2016–18) (United States) LA Galaxy (2018–19)
5	Luis Suárez	Uruguay	224	(England) Liverpool (2011–14) (Spain) Barcelona (2014–20) (Spain) Atlético Madrid (2020)
6	Carlos Saucedo	Bolivia	213	(Bolivia) San José (2012–13; 2017–19) (Costa Rica) Saprissa (2014) (Bolivia) Oriente Petrolero (2015) (Bolivia) Blooming (2015–16) (Bolivia) Real Potosí (2016) (Bolivia) Guabirá (2017) (Bolivia) Royal Pari (2020)
7	Edinson Cavani	Uruguay	209	(Italy) Napoli (2011–13) (France) Paris Saint-Germain (2013–20) (England) Manchester United (2020)

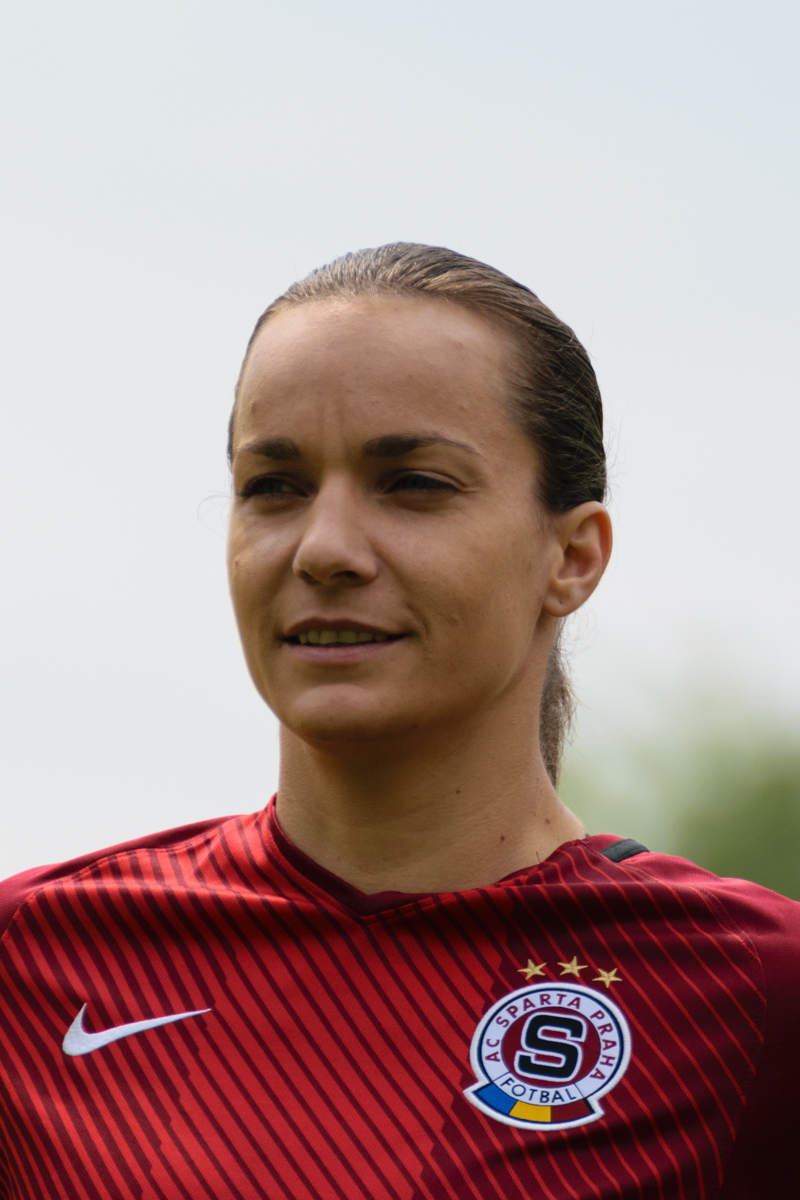
Lucie Martínková was the top women's goal scorer for club in 2021.

=== Women's winners ===
The women's award was introduced in 2021.

Year	Winner	Club	Goals
2021	(Czech Republic) Lucie Martínková	(Czech Republic) Sparta Prague	38
2022	(United States) Mia Fishel	(Mexico) UANL	33
2023	(Mexico) Charlyn Corral	(Mexico) Pachuca	34
2024	(Mexico) Charlyn Corral	(Mexico) Pachuca	42
2025	(Mexico) Charlyn Corral	(Mexico) Pachuca	50

== The World's Most Effective Top Division Goal Scorer ==
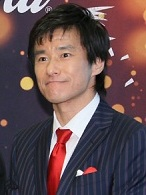
Masashi Nakayama is the only Japanese player to win the award.

This award was given annually from 1997 to 2004 to the player with the best goal ratio (goals/matches played) in a league season in any of the top 60 leagues in the world (as ranked by IFFHS for that given year).

=== Men's winners ===
Year	Winner	Club	Ratio
1997	(Turkey) Hakan Şükür	(Turkey) Galatasaray	1.188
1998	(Japan) Masashi Nakayama	(Japan) Júbilo Iwata	1.276
1999	(Brazil) Mário Jardel	(Portugal) Porto	1.125
2000	(Saudi Arabia) Hamzah Idris	(Saudi Arabia) Al Ittihad	1.320
2001	(Brazil) Romário	(Brazil) Vasco da Gama	1.167
2002	(Brazil) Mário Jardel	(Portugal) Sporting CP	1.400
2003	(Paraguay) José Cardozo	(Mexico) Toluca	1.381
2004	(Uzbekistan) Shuhrat Mirkholdirshoev	(Uzbekistan) Navbahor Namangan	1.192

== IFFHS World Cup's Best Player ==
=== Men's winners ===
Since 2018 IFFHS has given the award.

Best Player
World Cup	Golden Ball	Silver Ball
2018 Russia	(France) Antoine Griezmann	(Croatia) Luka Modrić
2022 Qatar	(Argentina) Lionel Messi	-
2026 Canada–Mexico–United States	(Argentina) Lionel Messi	-

== The World Team ==
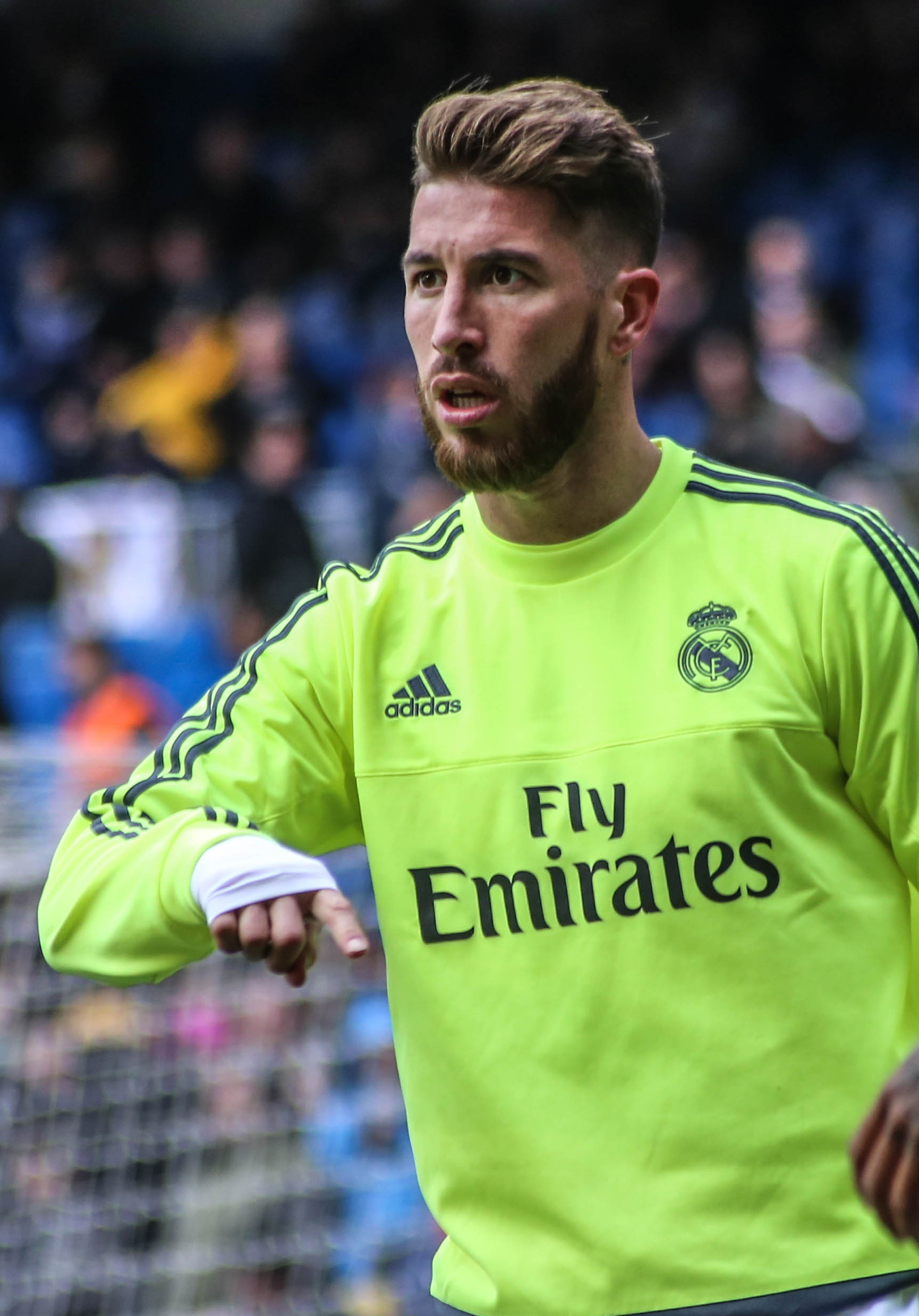
Sergio Ramos made four appearances in the World Team since 2017.

=== Men's winners ===
In 2017, IFFHS started to nominate a world team of the year.

Multiple appearances (2017–present)
Player	Apps	Years
(Argentina) Lionel Messi	7	2017, 2018, 2019, 2020, 2021, 2022, 2023
(Belgium) Kevin De Bruyne	6	2017, 2019, 2020, 2021, 2022, 2023
(Portugal) Cristiano Ronaldo	5	2017, 2018, 2019, 2020, 2021
(Canada) Alphonso Davies	5	2020, 2021, 2022, 2023, 2024
(France) Kylian Mbappé	5	2018, 2021, 2022, 2023, 2025
(Spain) Sergio Ramos	4	2017, 2018, 2019, 2020
(Norway) Erling Haaland	4	2022, 2023, 2024, 2025
(Croatia) Luka Modrić	3	2017, 2018, 2022
(Portugal) Rúben Dias	3	2021, 2023, 2024
(Morocco) Achraf Hakimi	3	2021, 2022, 2025
(Brazil) Marcelo	2	2017, 2018
(England) Trent Alexander-Arnold	2	2019, 2020
(Netherlands) Virgil van Dijk	2	2019, 2020
(Italy) Leonardo Bonucci	2	2017, 2021
(Poland) Robert Lewandowski	2	2020, 2021
(Belgium) Thibaut Courtois	2	2018, 2022
(Germany) Toni Kroos	2	2017, 2024
(Spain) Rodri	2	2023, 2024
(England) Jude Bellingham	2	2023, 2024
(Italy) Gianluigi Donnarumma	2	2021, 2025
(England) Harry Kane	2	2023, 2025
(Spain) Lamine Yamal	2	2024, 2025

=== 19th Century Men's Dream Team (2021) ===
The XI covers the 1863–1900 period.

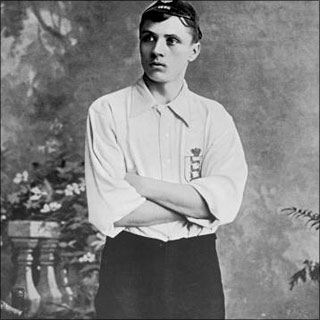
Steve Bloomer was selected as right inside forward for the All-time Men's Dream Team of the 19th Century.

Continent	Goalkeeper	Defenders	Midfielders	Forwards
World	(Wales) James Trainer	(England) Robert Holmes (Scotland) Walter Arnott	(Scotland) Neilly Gibson (Scotland) James Cowan (England) Ernest Needham	(England) Steve Bloomer (England) John Goodall (England) William Bassett (England) Gilbert Oswald Smith (Scotland) John Bell

=== 20th Century Men's Dream Team (2000) ===
The XIs cover the 1901–2000 period.

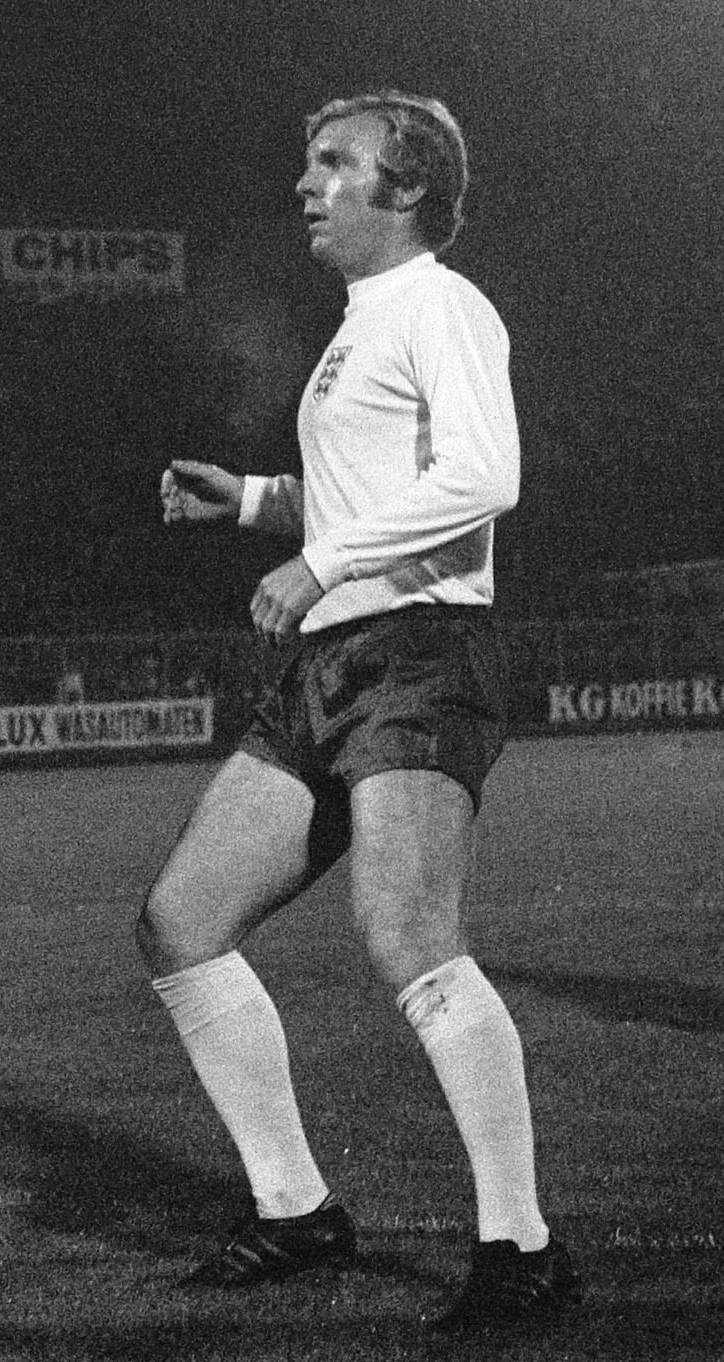
Bobby Moore was selected as one of the three defenders in the 20th Century World XI.

Continent	Goalkeeper	Defenders	Midfielders	Forwards
World	(Soviet Union) Lev Yashin	(England) Bobby Moore (West Germany) Franz Beckenbauer (Italy) Franco Baresi	(Germany) Lothar Matthäus (France) Michel Platini (Argentina) Diego Maradona (Netherlands) Johan Cruyff	(Hungary) Ferenc Puskas (Brazil) Pelé (Argentina) Alfredo Di Stefano
Europe	(Soviet Union) Lev Yashin	(England) Bobby Moore (West Germany) Franz Beckenbauer (Italy) Franco Baresi	(England) Bobby Charlton (France) Michel Platini (Netherlands) Johan Cruyff (Germany) Lothar Matthäus	(Hungary) Ferenc Puskas (West Germany) Gerd Müller (Portugal) Eusebio
South America	(Argentina) Amadeo Carrizo	(Brazil) Carlos Alberto Torres (Chile) Elías Figueroa (Argentina) Daniel Passarella (Brazil) Nilton Santos	(Brazil) Didi (Argentina) Diego Maradona (Brazil) Zico	(Argentina) Alfredo Di Stéfano (Brazil) Pelé (Brazil) Garrincha
CONCACAF	(Mexico) Antonio Carbajal	(Mexico) Ramon Ramirez (Mexico) Gustavo Pena (United States) Marcelo Balboa (Mexico) Claudio Suarez	(United States) Thomas Dooley (Mexico) Luis de la Fuente (Mexico) Raúl Cárdenas	(Panama) Julio Dely Valdés (Mexico) Hugo Sánchez (Mexico) Carlos Hermosillo
Africa	(Cameroon) Thomas N'Kono	(Ghana) Samuel Kuffour (Egypt) Hany Ramzy (Morocco) Noureddine Naybet (Nigeria) Taribo West	(Algeria) Lakhdar Belloumi (Nigeria) Finidi George (Ghana) Abedi Pele	(Cameroon) Roger Milla (Liberia) George Weah (Algeria) Rabah Madjer
Asia	(Saudi Arabia) Mohamed Al-Deayea	(Japan) Yasuhiko Okudera (South Korea) Hong Myung-bo (Japan) Masami Ihara	(Japan) Kazuyoshi Miura (Iran) Ali Parvin (South Korea) Kim Joo-sung (Saudi Arabia) Saeed Al-Owairan	(Saudi Arabia) Majed Abdullah (Iran) Ali Daei (South Korea) Cha Bum-kun
Oceania	(Australia) Mark Bosnich	(Australia) Joe Marston (Australia) Milan Ivanovic (New Caledonia) Antoine Kombouare (Australia) Alan Davidson	(Australia) Ned Zelic (Australia) Paul Okon (Australia) Robert Slater	(Australia) John Kosmina (Australia) Frank Farina (New Zealand) Wynton Rufer

=== All-time Men's Dream Team (2021) ===
The XIs published by IFFHS cover the 1901–2020 period.

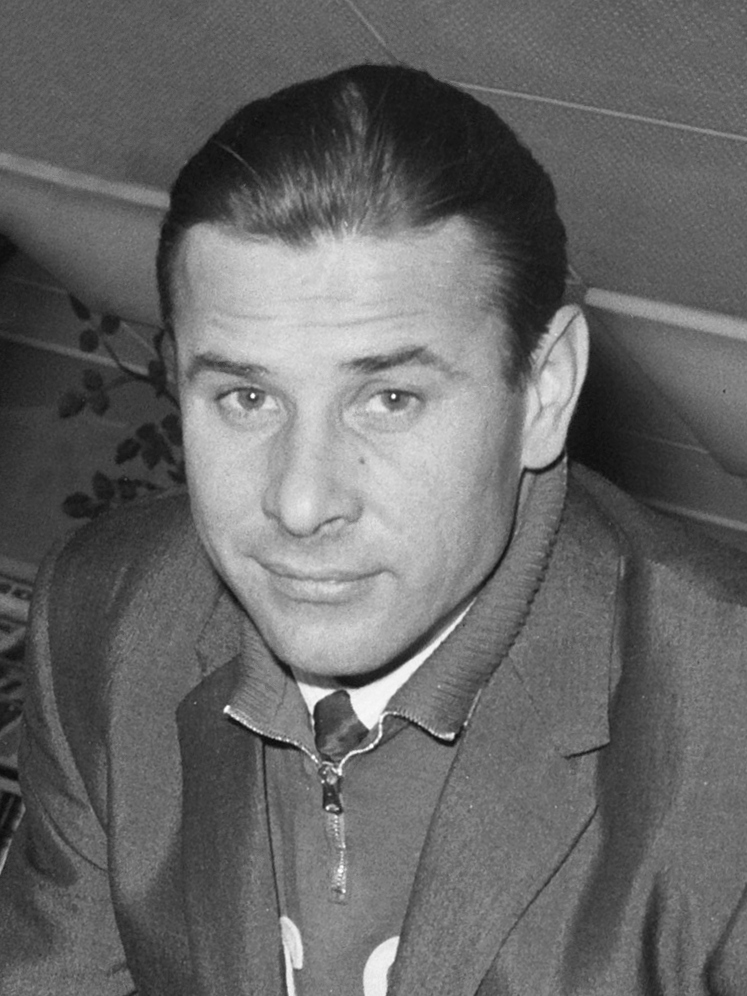
Lev Yashin was selected as the goalkeeper for the All-time Men's Dream Team as well as the Men Team of the Century, both times for the World's and Europe's first team.

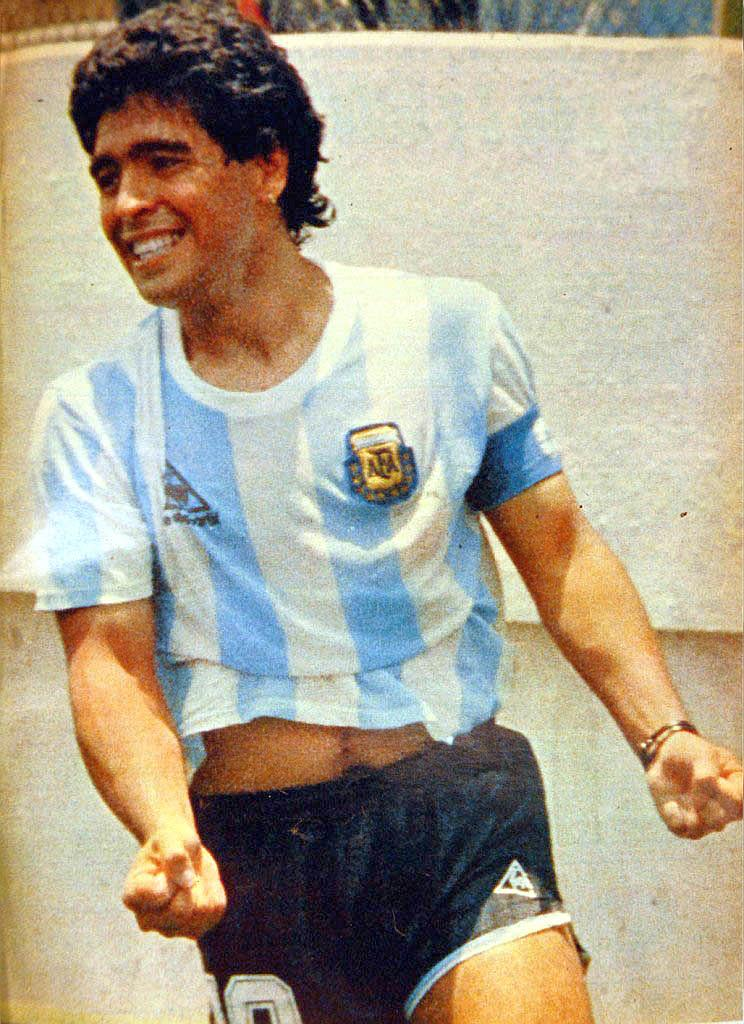
The Argentine Diego Maradona was part of the World and South America team.

Continent	Goalkeeper	Defenders	Midfielders	Forwards
World	(Soviet Union) Lev Yashin	(Brazil) Cafu (West Germany) Franz Beckenbauer (Italy) Franco Baresi (Italy) Paolo Maldini	(Spain) Xavi (Argentina) Diego Maradona (Netherlands) Johan Cruyff	(Portugal) Cristiano Ronaldo (Brazil) Pelé (Argentina) Lionel Messi
World B	(Italy) Gianluigi Buffon	(Brazil) Carlos Alberto Torres (England) Bobby Moore (Argentina) Daniel Passarella (Brazil) Roberto Carlos	(Germany) Lothar Matthäus (France) Zinedine Zidane (France) Michel Platini	(Brazil) Ronaldo (West Germany) Gerd Müller (Argentina) (Spain) Alfredo Di Stéfano
Europe	(Soviet Union) Lev Yashin	(Germany) Philipp Lahm (West Germany) Franz Beckenbauer (Italy) Franco Baresi (Italy) Paolo Maldini	(Spain) Xavi (France) Zinedine Zidane (France) Michel Platini	(Netherlands) Johan Cruyff (West Germany) Gerd Müller (Portugal) Cristiano Ronaldo
South America	(Argentina) Amadeo Carrizo	(Brazil) Cafu (Chile) Elías Figueroa (Argentina) Daniel Passarella (Brazil) Roberto Carlos	(Brazil) Didi (Argentina) Diego Maradona (Brazil) Zico	(Argentina) Alfredo Di Stéfano (Brazil) Pelé (Argentina) Lionel Messi
CONCACAF	(Mexico) Antonio Carbajal	(Mexico) Carlos Salcedo (Mexico) Claudio Suárez (Mexico) Rafael Márquez	(Mexico) Andrés Guardado (Costa Rica) Bryan Ruiz (Mexico) Raúl Cárdenas (Mexico) Luis de la Fuente	(Panama) Julio Dely Valdés (Mexico) Hugo Sánchez (United States) Clint Dempsey
Africa	(Cameroon) Thomas N'Kono	(Ghana) Samuel Kuffour (Cameroon) Rigobert Song (Morocco) Noureddine Naybet	(Ivory Coast) Yaya Touré (Nigeria) Nwankwo Kanu (Nigeria) Jay-Jay Okocha (Ghana) Abedi Pele	(Cameroon) Samuel Eto'o (Liberia) George Weah (Ivory Coast) Didier Drogba
Asia	(Saudi Arabia) Mohamed Al-Deayea	(Iran) Mehdi Mahdavikia (South Korea) Hong Myung-bo (Japan) Yasuhiko Okudera	(China) Wu Lei (Japan) Shinji Kagawa (Australia) Mile Jedinak (South Korea) Park Ji-sung	(South Korea) Son Heung-min (Saudi Arabia) Majed Abdullah (South Korea) Cha Bum-kun
Oceania	(New Zealand) Stefan Marinovic	(New Zealand) Ryan Nelsen (New Zealand) Tommy Smith (New Zealand) Winston Reid	(New Zealand) Ryan Thomas (New Zealand) Steve Sumner (New Zealand) Marco Rojas (Fiji) Roy Krishna	(New Zealand) Rory Fallon (New Zealand) Chris Wood (New Zealand) Wynton Rufer

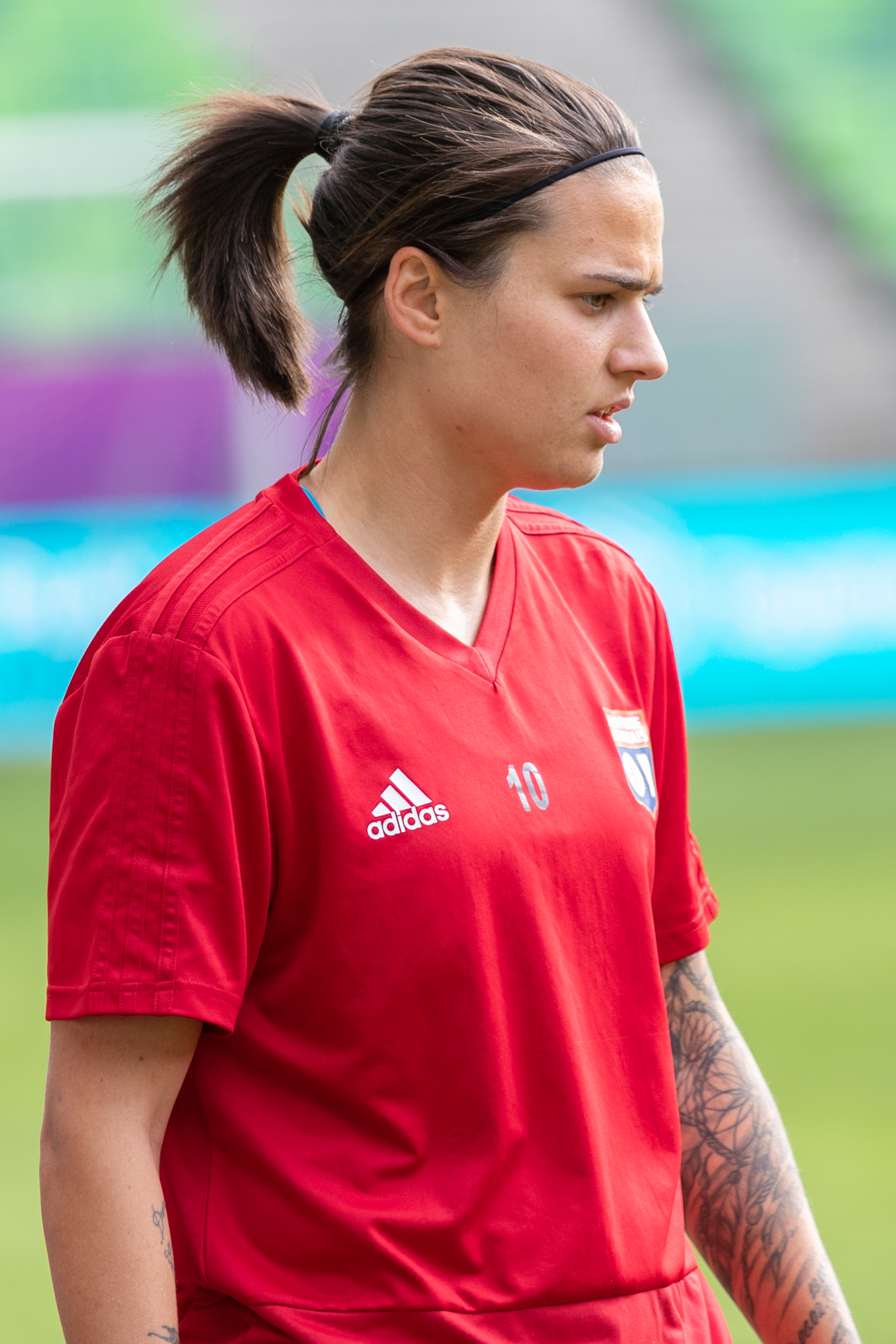
Dzsenifer Marozsán shares the fourth place for most appearances in the Women World Team (4) with Alex Morgan, behind Aitana Bonmatí (5), Lucy Bronze (6) and Wendie Renard (7).

=== Women's winners ===
In 2017, IFFHS started to nominate a world team of the year.

Multiple appearances (2017–present)
Player	Apps	Years
(France) Wendie Renard	7	2017, 2018, 2019, 2020, 2021, 2022, 2023
(England) Lucy Bronze	6	2017, 2018, 2019, 2020, 2022, 2025
(Spain) Aitana Bonmatí	5	2021, 2022, 2023, 2024, 2025
(Germany) Dzsenifer Marozsán	4	2017, 2018, 2019, 2020
(United States) Alex Morgan	4	2017, 2018, 2019, 2022
(France) Sarah Bouhaddi	3	2017, 2018, 2020
(Denmark) Pernille Harder	3	2017, 2018, 2020
(Australia) Sam Kerr	3	2017, 2021, 2023
(Spain) Alexia Putellas	3	2021, 2022, 2025
(Chile) Christiane Endler	2	2021, 2022
(Norway) Ada Hegerberg	2	2018, 2019
(France) Amandine Henry	2	2018, 2019
(Spain) Jennifer Hermoso	2	2021, 2023
(Japan) Saki Kumagai	2	2018, 2020
(Netherlands) Lieke Martens	2	2017, 2021
(Germany) Lena Oberdorf	2	2022, 2023
(Germany) Alexandra Popp	2	2020, 2022
(Norway) Caroline Graham Hansen	2	2021, 2024
(Spain) Salma Paralluelo	2	2023, 2024
(England) Leah Williamson	2	2022, 2025

=== All-time Women's Dream Team (2021) ===
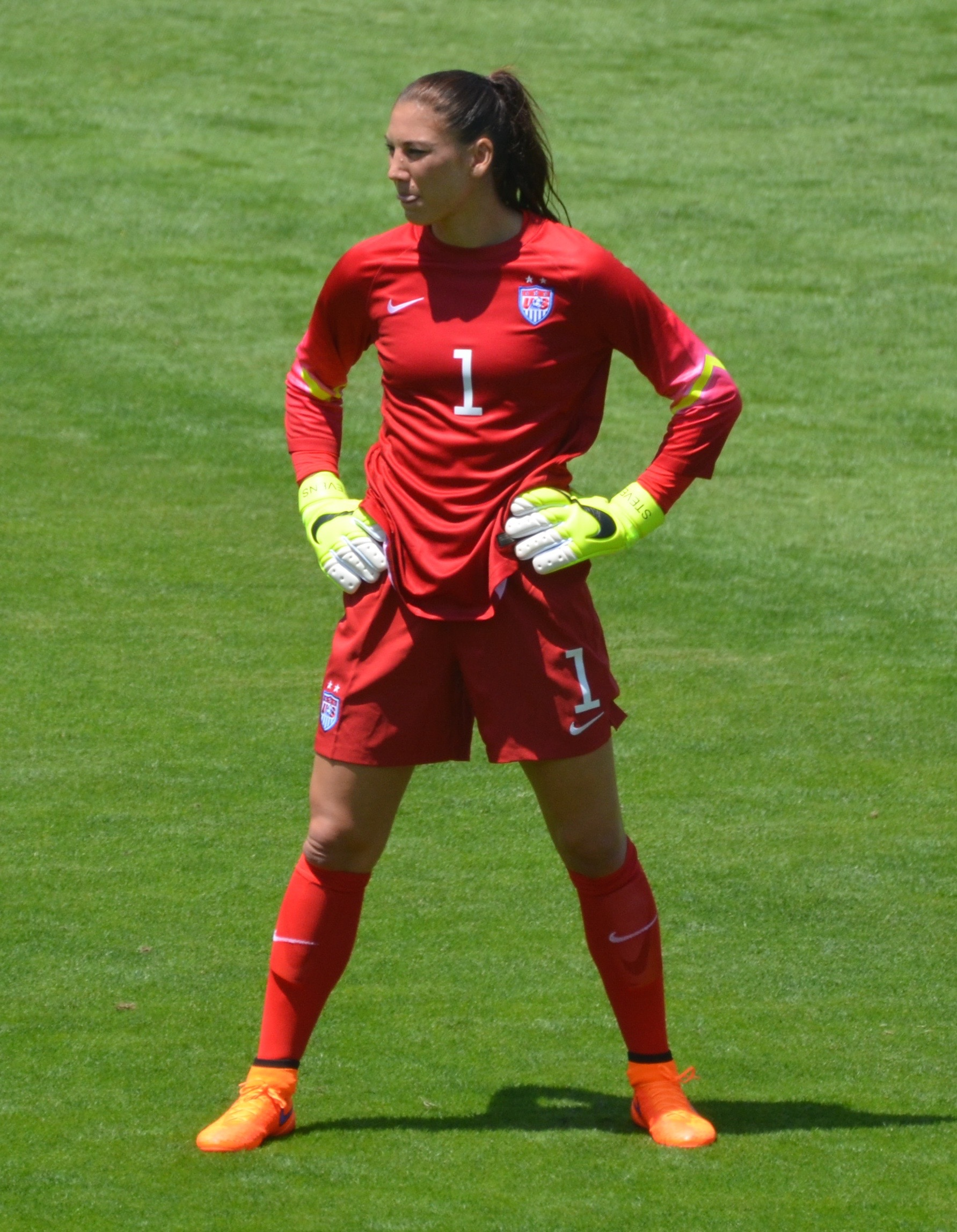
Hope Solo was selected in the World and CONCACAF All-time Women's Dream Team.

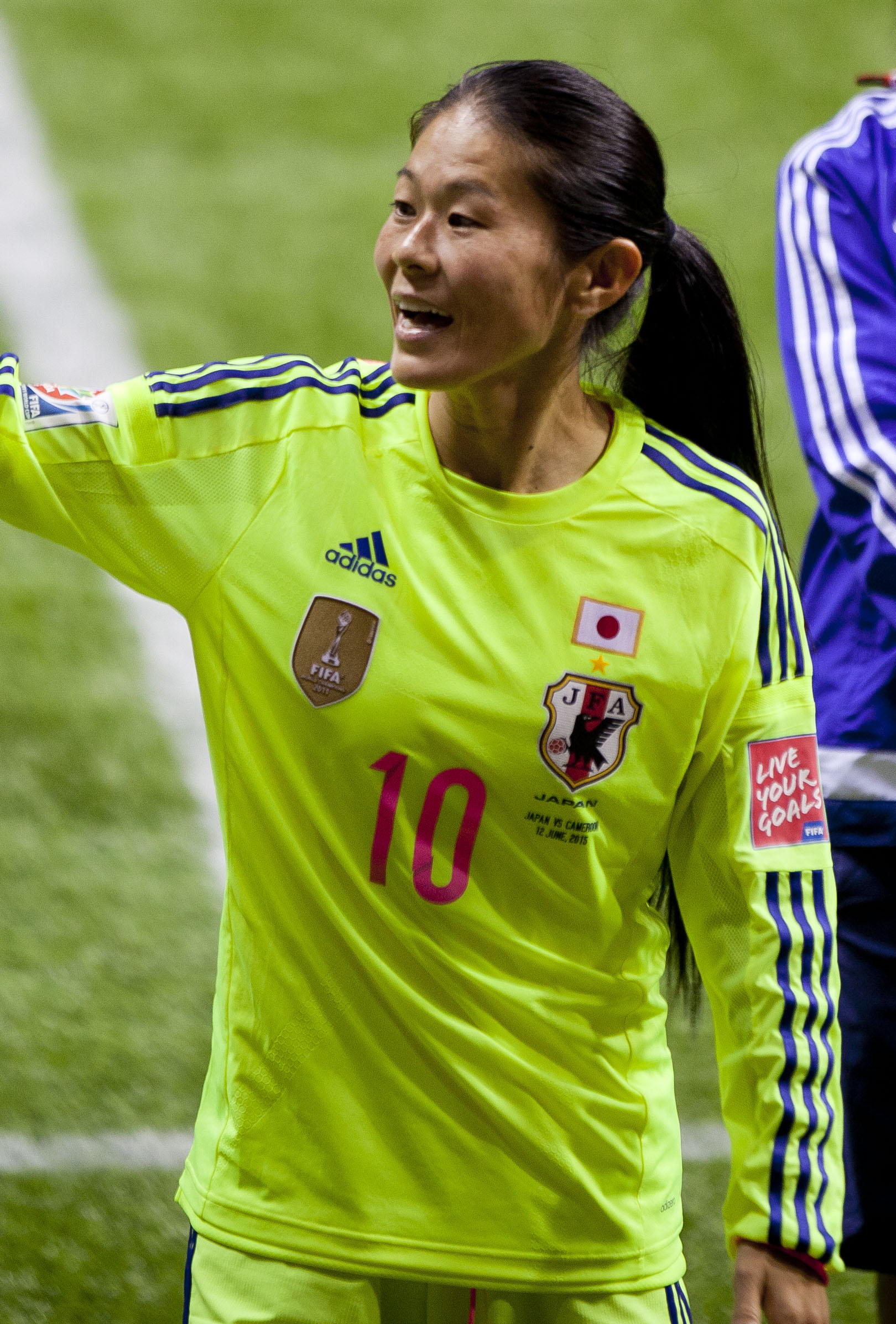
Homare Sawa was selected in the World and Asia All-time Women's Dream Team.

Continent	Goalkeeper	Defenders	Midfielders	Forwards
World	(United States) Hope Solo	(England) Lucy Bronze (France) Wendie Renard (United States) Christie Pearce (United States) Joy Fawcett	(Germany) Dzsenifer Marozsán (Japan) Homare Sawa (Brazil) Marta	(United States) Megan Rapinoe (Norway) Ada Hegerberg (United States) Alex Morgan
World B	(Germany) Nadine Angerer	(Germany) Ariane Hingst (Sweden) Nilla Fischer (Japan) Saki Kumagai (Norway) Hege Riise	(United States) Michelle Akers (United States) Kristine Lilly (Brazil) Formiga	(United States) Abby Wambach (United States) Carli Lloyd (Germany) Birgit Prinz
Europe	(Germany) Nadine Angerer	(England) Lucy Bronze (France) Wendie Renard (Sweden) Nilla Fischer (Norway) Linda Medalen	(Germany) Nadine Keßler (Germany) Dzsenifer Marozsán (France) Camille Abily	(Sweden) Lotta Schelin (Norway) Ada Hegerberg (Germany) Birgit Prinz
South America	(Chile) Christiane Endler	(Brazil) Fabiana (Brazil) Aline (Brazil) Elane (Brazil) Tamires	(Brazil) Formiga (Brazil) Sissi (Brazil) Roseli	(Brazil) Pretinha (Brazil) Cristiane (Brazil) Marta
CONCACAF	(United States) Hope Solo	(United States) Kelley O'Hara (United States) Joy Fawcett (United States) Christie Pearce (United States) Ali Krieger	(Costa Rica) Shirley Cruz (United States) Carli Lloyd (United States) Megan Rapinoe	(United States) Abby Wambach (United States) Mia Hamm (United States) Alex Morgan
Africa	(Cameroon) Annette Ngo Ndom	(Nigeria) Onome Ebi (South Africa) Janine van Wyk (Nigeria) Florence Omagbeni (Nigeria) Ngozi Ezeocha	(Nigeria) Perpetua Nkwocha (Nigeria) Mercy Akide (Cameroon) Gabrielle Onguéné	(Cameroon) Gaëlle Enganamouit (Nigeria) Asisat Oshoala (Malawi) Tabitha Chawinga
Asia	(Australia) Lydia Williams	(Australia) Ellie Carpenter (Australia) Cheryl Salisbury (Japan) Saki Kumagai (China) Fan Yunjie	(Japan) Homare Sawa (South Korea) Ji So-yun (Japan) Aya Miyama	(China) Liu Ailing (Australia) Samantha Kerr (China) Sun Wen
Oceania	(New Zealand) Erin Nayler	(New Zealand) Rebekah Stott (New Zealand) Rebecca Smith (New Zealand) Abby Erceg	(New Zealand) Ria Percival (New Zealand) Hayley Bowden (New Zealand) Katie Duncan (New Zealand) Betsy Hassett	(New Zealand) Ali Riley (New Zealand) Amber Hearn (New Zealand) Sarah Gregorius

== The World Youth (U20) Team ==
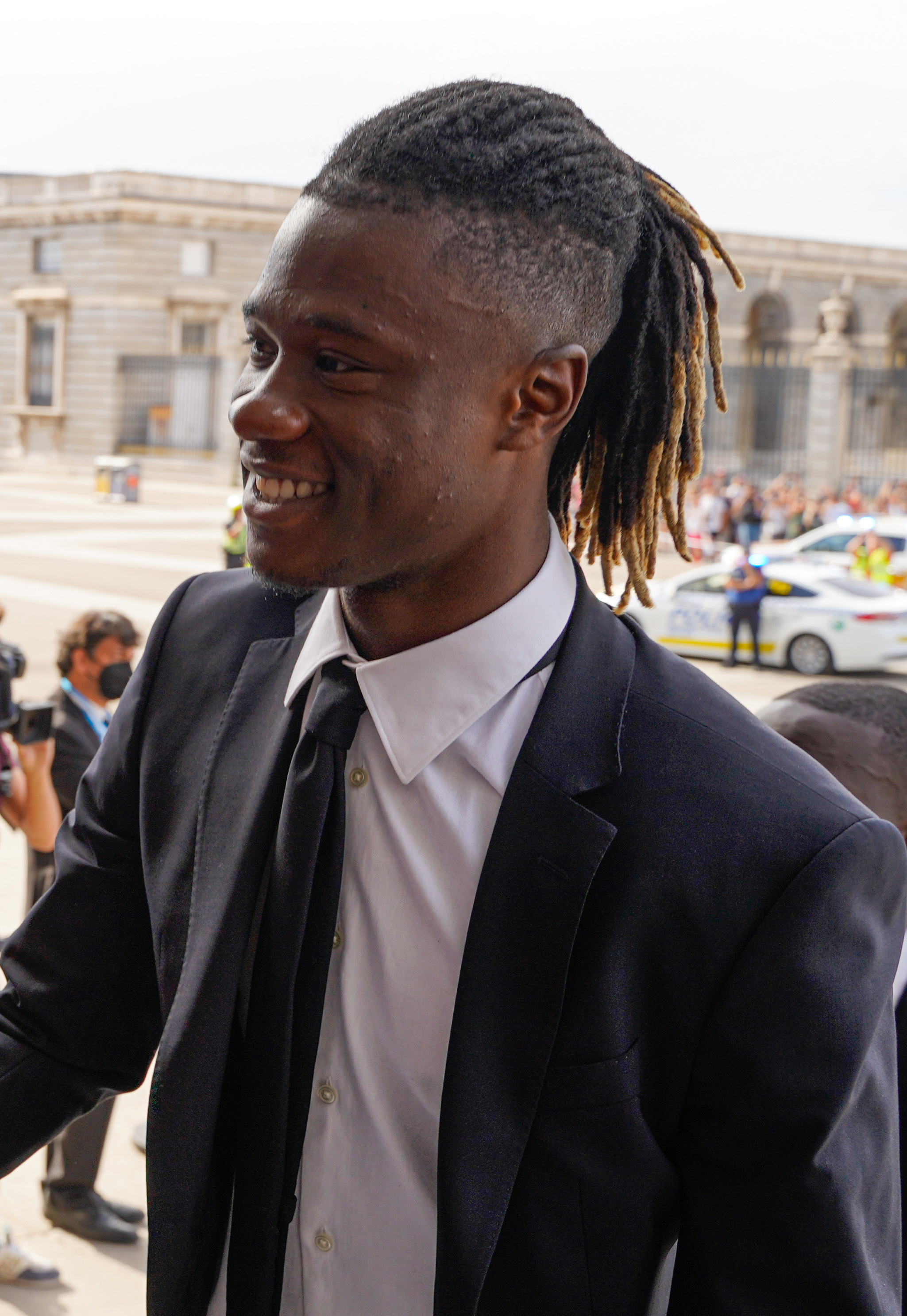
Eduardo Camavinga is one of four players to have appeared three times in the Men's World Youth (U20) Team, the others are Jamal Musiala, Jude Bellingham and Warren Zaïre-Emery.

The award was introduced in 2020.

=== Men's winners ===
Multiple appearances (2020–present)
Player	Apps	Years
(France) Eduardo Camavinga	3	2020, 2021, 2022
(England) Jude Bellingham	3	2021, 2022, 2023
(Germany) Jamal Musiala	3	2021, 2022, 2023
(France) Warren Zaïre-Emery	3	2023, 2024, 2025
(Brazil) Rodrygo	2	2020, 2021
(Spain) Ansu Fati	2	2020, 2022
(Spain) Pedri	2	2021, 2022
(Portugal) Nuno Mendes	2	2021, 2022
(Spain) Gavi	2	2022, 2023
(Argentina) Alejandro Garnacho	2	2023, 2024
(Spain) Lamine Yamal	2	2024, 2025
(Turkey) Arda Güler	2	2024, 2025
(Spain) Pau Cubarsí	2	2024, 2025
(France) Guillaume Restes	2	2024, 2025

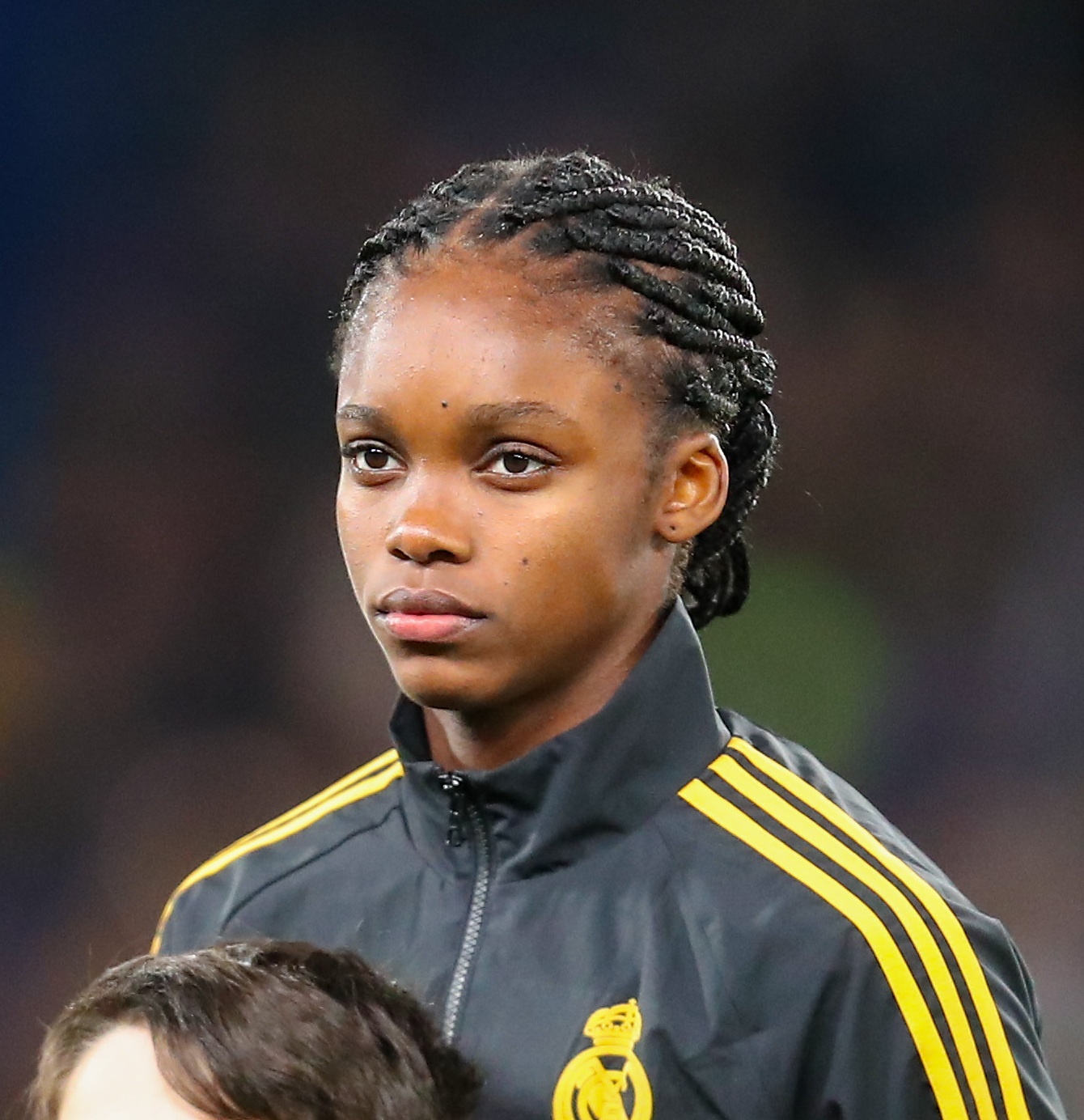
Linda Caicedo is the only player to have appeared five times in the Women's World Youth (U20) Team.

=== Women's winners ===
Multiple appearances (2020–present)
Player	Apps	Years
(Colombia) Linda Caicedo	5	2020, 2022, 2023, 2024, 2025
(Spain) Vicky López	4	2022, 2023, 2024, 2025
(Haiti) Melchie Dumornay	3	2021, 2022, 2023
(Spain) Cata Coll	2	2020, 2021
(Germany) Lena Oberdorf	2	2020, 2021
(Australia) Mary Fowler	2	2021, 2023
(Spain) Meritxell Font	2	2022, 2023
(Spain) Andrea Medina	2	2022, 2023
(Spain) Salma Paralluelo	2	2022, 2023
(Brazil) Tarciane	2	2022, 2023
(United States) Gisele Thompson	2	2024, 2025

== The World's Best Club Coach ==
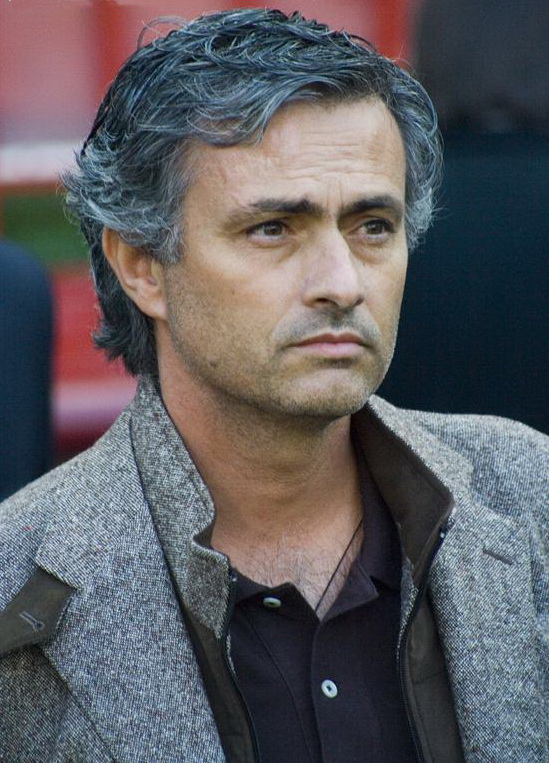
José Mourinho, World's Best Club Coach with three different clubs (Porto, Chelsea and Real Madrid)

=== Men's winners ===
Multiple winners (1996–present)
Coach	Wins	Years
(Portugal) José Mourinho	4	2004, 2005, 2010, 2012
(Italy) Carlo Ancelotti	4	2007, 2014, 2022, 2024
(Spain) Pep Guardiola	3	2009, 2011, 2023
(Italy) Marcello Lippi	2	1996, 1998
(Germany) Ottmar Hitzfeld	2	1997, 2001
(Argentina) Carlos Bianchi	2	2000, 2003
(Scotland) Alex Ferguson	2	1999, 2008
(France) Zinedine Zidane	2	2017, 2018
(Spain) Luis Enrique	2	2015, 2025

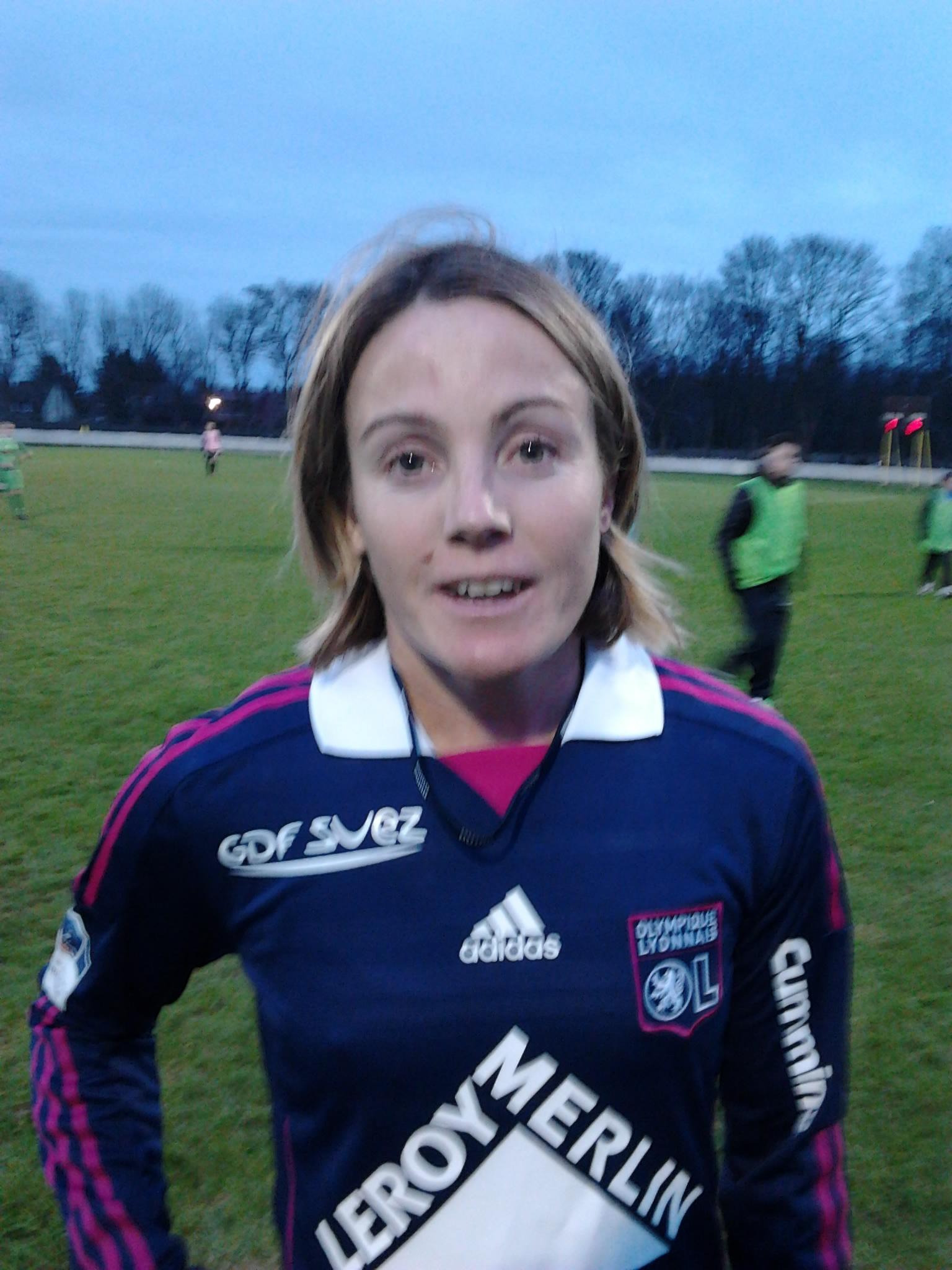
Sonia Bompastor, first person to win the UEFA Women's Champions League as both a player and a manager

=== Women's winners ===
Year	Winner	Club
2020	(France) Jean-Luc Vasseur	(France) Lyon
2021	(Spain) Lluís Cortés	(Spain) Barcelona
2022	(France) Sonia Bompastor	(France) Lyon
2023	(Spain) Jonatan Giráldez	(Spain) Barcelona
2024	(Spain) Jonatan Giráldez	(Spain) Barcelona
2025	(Netherlands) Renée Slegers	(England) Arsenal

== The World's Best National Coach ==
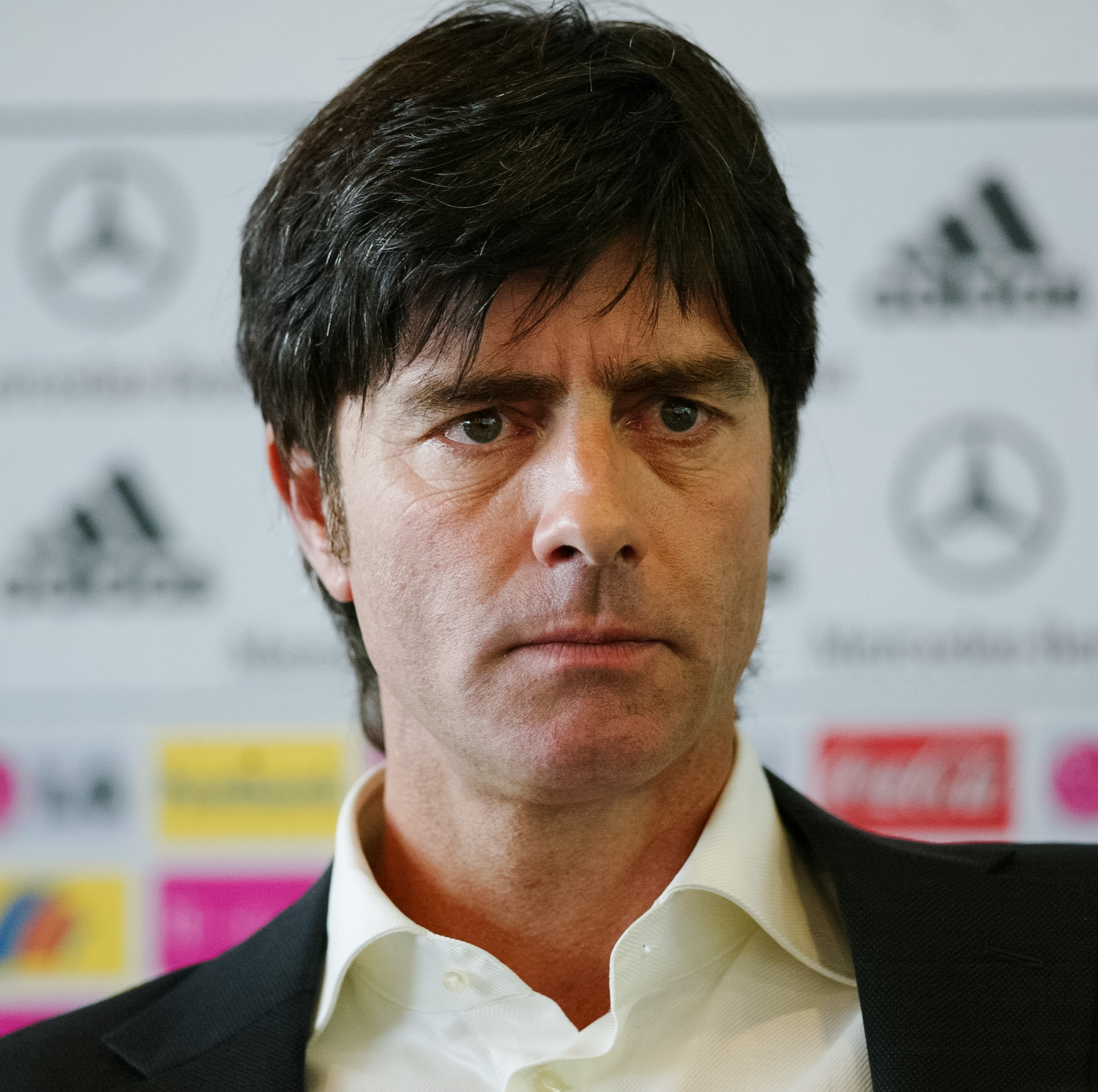
Joachim Löw, World's Best National Coach with Germany in 2014 and 2017

=== Men's winners ===
Multiple winners (1996–present)
Coach	Wins	Years
(Spain) Vicente del Bosque	4	2009, 2010, 2012, 2013
(Germany) Joachim Löw	2	2014, 2017
(Portugal) Fernando Santos	2	2016, 2019
(France) Didier Deschamps	2	2018, 2020
(Argentina) Lionel Scaloni	2	2022, 2023
(Spain) Luis de la Fuente	2	2024, 2025

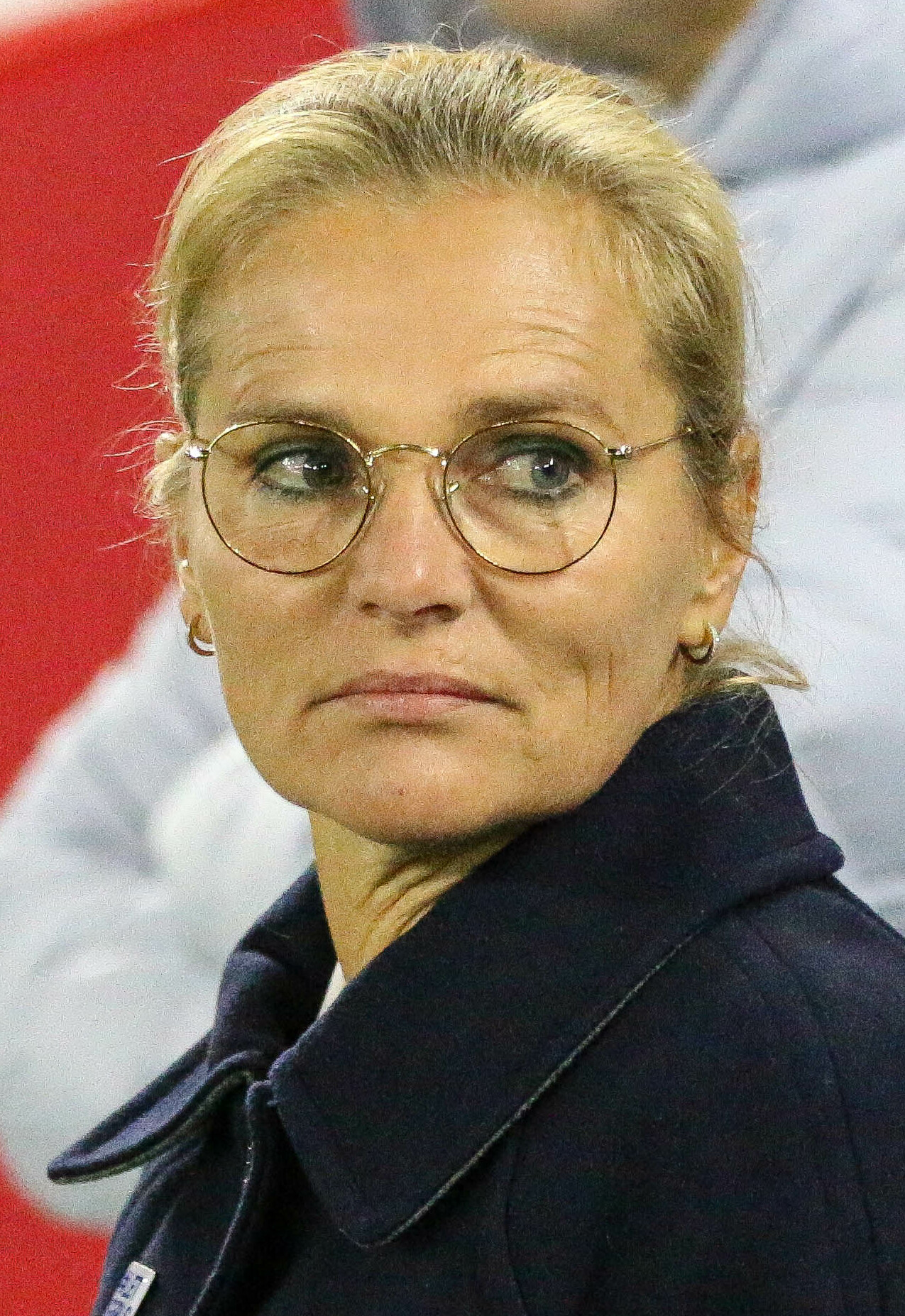
Sarina Wiegman, World's Best National Coach for Netherlands and England

=== Women's winners ===
Year	Winner	National team
2020	(Netherlands) Sarina Wiegman	Netherlands
2021	(England) Bev Priestman	Canada
2022	(Netherlands) Sarina Wiegman	England
2023	(Netherlands) Sarina Wiegman	England
2024	(England) Emma Hayes	United States
2025	(Netherlands) Sarina Wiegman	England

== The World's Best Referee ==
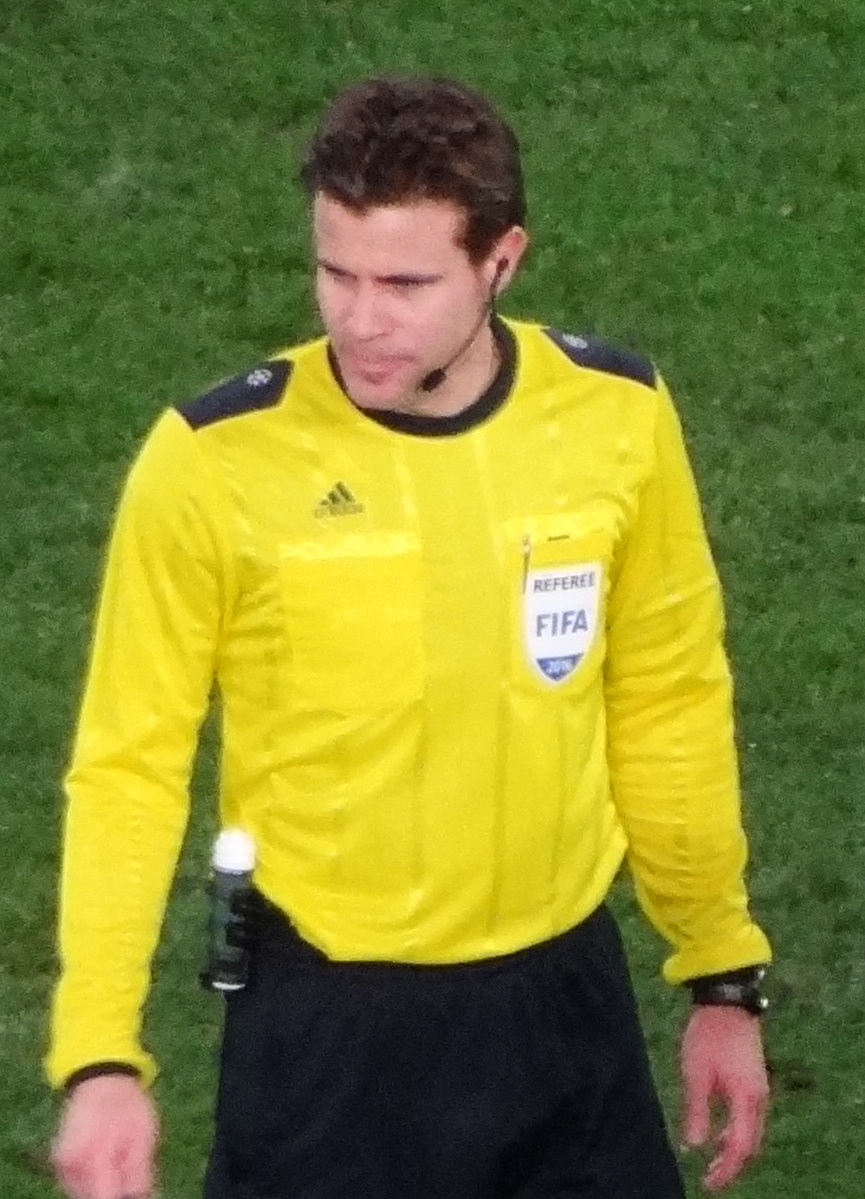
Felix Brych, World's Best Referee in 2017 and 2021

=== Men's winners ===
In 2020, Felix Brych was awarded the prize for Men's Referee of the Decade (2011–20), and of the 21st Century (2001–20).

In the same year, Pierluigi Collina was also awarded the prize for the Best All-Time Men's Referee since the award's inception (1987–2020).

Year	Winner
1987	(Brazil) Romualdo Arppi Filho
1988	(France) Michel Vautrot
1989	(France) Michel Vautrot
1990	(Brazil) José Roberto Wright
1991	(Denmark) Peter Mikkelsen
1992	(Germany) Aron Schmidhuber
1993	(Denmark) Peter Mikkelsen
1994	(Hungary) Sándor Puhl
1995	(Hungary) Sándor Puhl
1996	(Hungary) Sándor Puhl
1997	(Hungary) Sándor Puhl
1998	(Italy) Pierluigi Collina
1999	(Italy) Pierluigi Collina
2000	(Italy) Pierluigi Collina
2001	(Italy) Pierluigi Collina
2002	(Italy) Pierluigi Collina
2003	(Italy) Pierluigi Collina
2004	(Germany) Markus Merk
2005	(Germany) Markus Merk
2006	(Argentina) Horacio Elizondo
2007	(Germany) Markus Merk
2008	(Italy) Roberto Rosetti
2009	(Switzerland) Massimo Busacca
2010	(England) Howard Webb
2011	(Hungary) Viktor Kassai
2012	(Portugal) Pedro Proença
2013	(England) Howard Webb
2014	(Italy) Nicola Rizzoli
2015	(Italy) Nicola Rizzoli
2016	(England) Mark Clattenburg
2017	(Germany) Felix Brych
2018	(Argentina) Néstor Pitana
2019	(Slovenia) Damir Skomina
2020	(Italy) Daniele Orsato
2021	(Germany) Felix Brych
2022	(Poland) Szymon Marciniak
2023	(Poland) Szymon Marciniak
2024	(France) François Letexier
2025	(France) Clément Turpin

Multiple winners (1987–present)
Referee	Wins	Years
(Italy) Pierluigi Collina	6	1998, 1999, 2000, 2001, 2002, 2003
(Hungary) Sándor Puhl	4	1994, 1995, 1996, 1997
(Germany) Markus Merk	3	2004, 2005, 2007
(France) Michel Vautrot	2	1988, 1989
(Denmark) Peter Mikkelsen	2	1991, 1993
(England) Howard Webb	2	2010, 2013
(Italy) Nicola Rizzoli	2	2014, 2015
(Germany) Felix Brych	2	2017, 2021
(Poland) Szymon Marciniak	2	2022, 2023

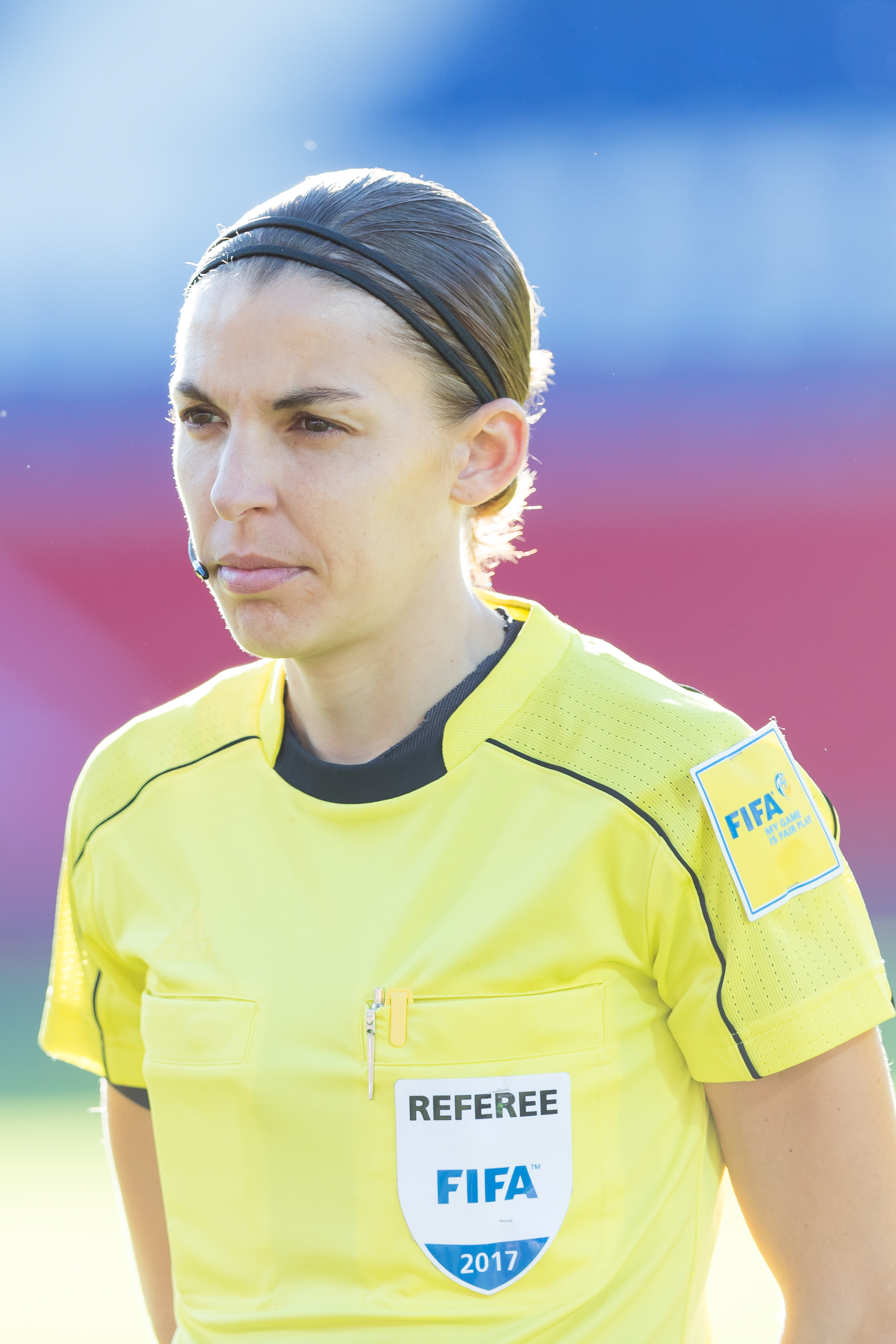
Stéphanie Frappart, World's Best Referee for five years in a row

=== Women's winners ===
Bibiana Steinhaus was awarded the prize for Women's Referee of the Decade 2011–20.

Year	Winner
2012	(Sweden) Jenny Palmqvist
2013	(Germany) Bibiana Steinhaus
2014	(Germany) Bibiana Steinhaus
2015	(Ukraine) Kateryna Monzul
2016	(Hungary) Katalin Kulcsar
2017	(Germany) Bibiana Steinhaus
2018	(Germany) Bibiana Steinhaus
2019	(France) Stéphanie Frappart
2020	(France) Stéphanie Frappart
2021	(France) Stéphanie Frappart
2022	(France) Stéphanie Frappart
2023	(France) Stéphanie Frappart
2024	(England) Rebecca Welch
2025	(Italy) Maria Sole Ferrieri Caputi

Multiple winners (2012–present)
Referee	Wins	Years
(France) Stéphanie Frappart	5	2019, 2020, 2021, 2022, 2023
(Germany) Bibiana Steinhaus	4	2013, 2014, 2017, 2018

== See also ==
- IFFHS World's Best International Goal Scorer
- IFFHS World's Best Top Division Goal Scorer
- IFFHS World's Best Top Goal Scorer
- IFFHS World's Best National Coach
- IFFHS World's Best Club Coach
- IFFHS World's Best Goalkeeper
- IFFHS World's Best Player
- IFFHS World's Best Club
- IFFHS World Team
