= Jimmy Forrest (footballer) =

English footballer (1864-1925)

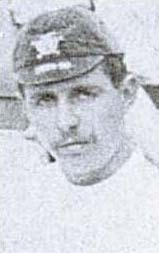

Personal information
- Full name: James Henry Forrest
- Date of birth: 24 June 1864
- Place of birth: Blackburn, England
- Date of death: 30 December 1925 (aged 61)
- Position: Half-back

Youth career
- Imperial United
- Witton
- King's Own Blackburn

Senior career*
Years	Team	Apps	(Gls)
1883–1895	Blackburn Rovers	148	(2)
1895–1896	Darwen	10	(1)

International career
1884–1890	England	11	(0)
- * Club domestic league appearances and goals

James Henry Forrest (24 June 1864 – 30 December 1925) was an English footballer whose career spanned the transition from amateurism to professionalism in English football in the 1880s and 1890s. He played most of his club career for Blackburn Rovers, whose early embracing of professionalism enabled them to become one of the major teams in English football, and with whom he appeared on the winning side in five FA Cup finals. He was the first professional player to appear for England for whom he made eleven appearances, as a half-back.

== Playing career ==
=== Blackburn Rovers ===
==== Early days ====
Forrest was born in Blackburn and began playing football at school. By the time he was twelve, he was captain of local side Imperial United. He was first spotted by Blackburn Rovers when playing for Witton in 1880. By now he had left school and was working as a tape sizer in the cotton trade. After moving on to play for King's Own Blackburn, he was eventually persuaded to join Rovers in January 1883.

At this time there was no organised league system, and Blackburn were restricted to friendly matches and cup tournaments, especially the Lancashire Senior Cup and the FA Cup, in which they had been finalists in 1882.

In his first season with Rovers, they reached the FA cup final with easy victories in the early rounds over Southport Central (7–0), South Shore (7–0), Padiham (3–0) and Staveley (5–1), before meeting Upton Park in the fifth round. This match was won 3–0 and was followed by a 1–0 semi-final victory over Notts County, thus setting up a final appearance against Scottish club Queen's Park, who had defeated Rovers' local rivals, and cup holders, Blackburn Olympic in the semi-final.

Forrest was called up for his first England cap for their final match in the inaugural British Home Championship against Wales on 17 March 1884, still aged only 19, replacing Notts County's Stuart Macrae at left half. According to Philip Gibbons in "Association Football in Victorian England", "the Welsh had few answers to the skilful England forwards" and England won by four goals (including a pair from William Bromley-Davenport) to nil.

In the cup final, played at the Kennington Oval on 29 March, Rovers lined up against a Queen's Park side, most of whom were Scottish internationals. After half an hour of play in the final, Forrest (who was playing at right-half) "delivered an excellent pass" to Jimmy Brown who rounded two defenders prior to crossing the ball into the Queen's Park goalmouth. The goalkeeper, George Gillespie, was unable to clear the ball which fell to Joe Sowerbutts who had only to apply the gentlest touch to help the ball between the posts. Shortly after, William Anderson thought he had scored for the Scots but the goal was disallowed for offside by referee Francis Marindin. Forrest then scored Blackburn's second goal – after the ball was partially cleared by Gillespie it fell to Joe Lofthouse who returned it into the goalmouth where Forrest was waiting to put the ball in the net. Forrest was almost certainly offside but, in the absence of an appeal by the Scots, Mandarin allowed the goal to stand. By half-time, Queen's Park had pulled a goal back through Christie. In the second half, both sides had goals disallowed for offside, but there was no further score, and Blackburn Rovers took the cup for the first time.

Forrest was aged 19 years and 277 days when he scored his first FA Cup final goal, making him the youngest FA Cup Final scorer at the time, a record he retained for 75 years, until Dicky Dorsett scored for Wolverhampton Wanderers in the 1939 FA Cup Final.

In the 1884–85 FA Cup, Blackburn again came through the early rounds without difficulty, with a victory over Rossendale (11–0) before meeting local rivals, Blackburn Olympic in the second round. Rovers won the derby match 3–2 in a tight game with a brace from Howard Fecitt and a third from Joe Sowerbutts. Rovers then easily went past Forrest's old club Witton (5–1) and Romford (8–0); a bye in round five saw them through to a sixth round meeting with West Bromwich Albion. This resulted in a 2–0 victory for the cup holders, who then met Old Carthusians in the semi-final, played on 7 March 1885. Rovers had little difficulty getting past the Old Boys 5–1 to set up a repeat of the previous year's final against Queen's Park, who had come through replayed matches against Notts County and Nottingham Forest in their last two rounds.

A week before the semi-final, Forrest was selected for the Home Championship match against Ireland, together with his Rovers teammates, Herby Arthur, Joe Lofthouse and Jimmy Brown. England beat the Irish with ease by four goals to nil, including a goal each from Lofthouse and Brown. The Rovers quartet retained their places for the next match, against Wales, played on 14 March at Leamington Road, Blackburn. England were "disappointing" and Wales returned home with a well-deserved 1–1 draw.

The next England match was a week later on 21 March against Scotland to be played at The Oval. Forrest and his three Blackburn colleagues were again selected for England. The Scottish officials complained as they argued that Forrest was a professional. At the time he was receiving £1 a week from Blackburn Rovers. Forrest was eventually allowed to play but he had to wear a different jersey from the rest of the team. Blackburn Rovers also had to agree not to pay him his wages in the week that he played for England, thus enabling Forrest to become the first professional to play for England. The match itself ended 1–1, with England's equalizer coming from Charlie Bambridge, thus allowing the Scots to claim the championship.

The 1885 FA Cup Final, played at the Oval on 4 April, was against Queen's Park, whom Blackburn had beaten in the previous year's final. This time there was little controversy and it was soon clear that Rovers were the superior side, even though Queen's Park fielded six players who had appeared in the England versus Scotland match two weeks earlier. After 14 minutes, Forrest got the better of his marker Charles Campbell and was able to fire Rovers in front from close range, after Jimmy Brown's shot had come back off the goal-posts. Although Walter Arnott did put the ball in the net just before half-time, referee Francis Marindin disallowed the "goal" for handball. The Scots continued to attack, but Rovers increased their lead on 58 minutes when Brown, "who had played throughout like a man inspired", added a second goal. From this point, Rovers controlled the game, and Queen's Park's efforts were to no avail. After the final whistle, the Scottish team were a little unhappy that Rovers had fielded players, including Forrest, whose amateur status was questionable – despite this, there was little doubt that professionalism was here to stay.

During the summer of 1885, there was further pressure put on the Football Association to accept professionalism, culminating in a special meeting on 20 July, after which it was announced that it was "in the interests of Association Football, to legalise the employment of professional football players, but only under certain restrictions". Clubs were allowed to pay players provided that they had either been born or had lived for two years within a six-mile radius of the ground. There were also rules preventing professional players playing for more than one club in a season, without obtaining special permission, and all professional players had to be registered with the FA.

The new rules caused problems for some clubs in the 1885–86 FA Cup tournament, especially those who had recruited large numbers of players from Scotland. Leading teams, including Bolton Wanderers and Preston North End, were disqualified for fielding ineligible players. As a consequence, many minor teams were able to progress into the later rounds, including Brentwood who Blackburn Rovers met in the sixth round. A 3–1 victory took Rovers through to a semi-final against the last surviving totally amateur side, Swifts who included England internationals Charlie and Arthur Bambridge, and George Brann. Despite this, Swifts presented no more of a challenge than Rovers' earlier opponents and after a 2–1 victory in the semi-final, played at the County Cricket Ground, Derby on 13 March 1886, they were through to the final, where they were to meet West Bromwich Albion.

Forrest was prevented from playing for England against Ireland in the opening match of the 1886 British Home Championship as this was played on the day of the FA cup semi-final. He regained his place for the next matches, against Scotland on 27 March 1886 which ended 1–1 and Wales two days later, which was won 3–1.

The 1886 FA Cup Final against West Bromwich Albion was played at the Kennington Oval on 3 April 1886. Although Blackburn fielded seven players who had appeared in the two previous finals, whereas Albion had reached the final for the first time, the two sides were evenly matched and the game ended goalless. The replay took place at Derbyshire County Cricket Club's Racecourse Ground in Derby, the first time an FA cup final had been played outside London. Although Albion started the match continually attacking the Rovers goal, eventually Blackburn's experience began to show. Joe Sowerbutts added to his goal in the 1884 final by scoring the first after 26 minutes before Jimmy Brown, who had scored in the 1885 final added a second with seventeen minutes to go. Blackburn Rovers had thus become one of only two clubs (the other was Wanderers) to win the cup in three consecutive seasons.

Blackburn Rovers started their campaign to claim the FA cup for a record fourth time with a bye as their first round opponents Halliwell withdrew. In the second round, they were drawn to play in Scotland against the previous season's Scottish Cup finalists, Renton based in the village of Renton, West Dunbartonshire. The first match ended in a 2–2 draw with Renton causing one of the biggest shocks for years when the Scottish club won the replay 2–0.

Forrest was selected for all three matches in the 1887 British Home Championship. The matches against Ireland and Wales resulted in easy victories with scores of 7–0 and 4–0 respectively, but in England's final match of the tournament against Scotland played at Leamington Road, Blackburn on 19 March 1887 the Scots won 3–2 and went on to claim the championship.

In the 1887–88 FA Cup campaign, Rovers had an easy passage through the early rounds with victories against other Lancashire clubs, including Blackburn Olympic (5–1), Accrington (3–1) and Darwen (3–0), before they were drawn against Derby Junction who were appearing in the FA cup for the first time. Rovers were defeated 2–1 in the sixth round match which was played at the Derby Arboretum.

As a result of Rovers' relative lack of success, none of their players were selected to represent England in the 1888 British Home Championship, with Forrest losing his place to Wolverhampton Wanderers's Harry Allen.

==== Football League era ====
In the spring of 1888 the leading professional clubs in Lancashire and the West Midlands agreed to inaugurate a league tournament to develop the level of competition between clubs above friendly matches and appearances in cup tournaments. The new league was set up following meetings at Anderson's Hotel in London on 23 March 1888 on the eve of the 1888 FA Cup Final followed by a further meeting on 17 April at Manchester's Royal Hotel. The first season of the new Football League began a few months later on 8 September with Blackburn Rovers as one of the twelve original member clubs. Rovers' first league game took place on 15 September 1888, at Leamington Road, then home of Blackburn Rovers, when they shared ten goals in a "thrilling" match with Accrington. Jimmy Forrest scored his debut League goal on 3 November 1888 at Turf Moor, Burnley when Blackburn Rovers defeated Burnley 7–1. Forrest made 19 league appearances, all at left-half, and scored one League goal. As a wing-half he played in a midfield that achieved big (three-League-goals-or-more) League wins on five separate occasions. as Blackburn finished the first league season in fourth place, a long way behind the champions Preston North End, who were now by far the strongest club in England, justly earning them the title of "The Invincibles".

In the FA cup, after a victory over Accrington and a "walkover" past Swifts, Blackburn defeated Aston Villa 8–1 in the third round (with four goals from Jack Southworth) before going out in the semi-final to Wolverhampton Wanderers after a replay. Forrest was recalled to the England team for the match against Scotland on 13 April 1889 which ended in a 3–2 victory for the Scots.

The 1889–90 season saw a modest improvement in Rover's league performance with a third-place finish, with Forrest only missing one match. The FA cup saw victories over Sunderland and Grimsby Town, before defeating Bootle 7–0 in the third round, with a hat-trick from Nat Walton. The semi-final saw a re-run of the previous year's match against Wolves, but this time Rovers reached the final with a 1–0 victory with Southworth the scorer. Before the cup final, Forrest (together with Rovers teammates Billy Townley, Joe Lofthouse, John Barton and Nat Walton) was selected for the England match against Ireland on 15 March 1890. Because of the crowded fixture list, England also played a match against Wales on the same day. The match against Ireland ended in a 9–1 victory for England, with a hat-trick from Fred Geary. This was Forrest's final appearance for England, in an international career which spanned seven seasons in which he played eleven times, with six victories, three draws and two defeats, both against Scotland.

The cup final was played at the Kennington Oval on 29 March 1890 against The Wednesday who were the champions of the Football Alliance which had been set up to provide competition for clubs excluded from the Football League. Rovers put out a team of players most of whom were England or Scotland internationals, although Wednesday had England internationals Teddy Brayshaw and Billy Betts in their defence. From the kick-off, the Rovers forwards had the Wednesday defence under pressure which led to Jack Dungworth handling the ball on the edge of his goal area in the sixth minute. Forrest took the free kick which fell to Billy Townley whose shot took a deflection for the first goal. Further goals from Nat Walton and Townley gave Rovers a 3–0 lead at half-time. The second half continued with Rovers on top with Jack Southworth adding a fourth goal in the fiftieth minute before Albert Mumford was able to score for Wednesday. Further goals from Townley and Joe Lofthouse in the last 15 minutes gave a winning scoreline of 6–1 to Rovers. Townley had thus become the first player to score an FA cup final hat-trick. According to Gibbons, "the Blackburn side had given one of the finest exhibitions of attacking football in an FA cup final, with England internationals Walton, Townley, Lofthouse and John Southworth at the peak of their form."

Forrest continued to play at the centre of Blackburn's defence for the 1890–91 season, forming a settled half-back line alongside fellow internationals Jack Barton and Geordie Dewar. Forrest only missed one league game as Rovers ended the campaign in sixth position. Once again, Rovers' priority was in the FA cup. In the first round they went past Middlesbrough Ironopolis 3–0 in a replayed match to set up a meeting with Chester in the second round. Jack Southworth netted his fourth hat-trick of the season in a 7–0 victory over his former club. Victories over Midlands clubs, Wolverhampton Wanderers and West Bromwich Albion set up Rovers' sixth appearance in the cup final, to be played at The Oval on 21 March 1891, against Notts County who had defeated Rovers 7–1 in the penultimate league match on 14 March. Despite this Rovers were expected to win the final as they were the holders and fielded seven of the previous year's winning side, including Forrest, already with four cup winners medals. Blackburn dominated the early stages of the game with Dewar scoring after eight minutes. Goals from Jack Southworth and Billy Townley gave a half-time score of 3–0 to Rovers. Although County pulled a goal back in the second half, Rovers were able to defend their lead and thus claimed the cup for the second consecutive year, the fifth time overall. Forrest thus became the third player to win five FA cup finals, after Arthur Kinnaird and Charles Wollaston.

Rovers' defence of the FA cup faltered at the second round stage where they suffered their first cup defeat for three seasons, against West Bromwich Albion, who went on to claim the trophy in the final. The half-back line-up of the previous season was broken up as a result of injuries to Barton and Dewar, and Rovers finished the 1891–92 season in ninth place having conceded 65 goals, with only Accrington and Darwen conceding more.

For the 1892–93 season, Barton was replaced by Geordie Anderson and the trio of Forrest, Anderson and Dewar were to remain at the heart of the Rovers' defence for the next three seasons, during which their league campaigns ended with finishes in ninth, fourth and fifth places respectively. Although Rovers reached the FA Cup semi-finals in 1893 and 1894, their cup-winning exploits were over until 1928.

Forrest remained at Rovers until October 1895, when there was an acrimonious parting of the ways; Forrest claimed that the committee at Rovers had asked him to revert to amateur status to save paying him a wage, a charge that was vigorously denied by the club. He moved to Darwen after twelve eventful seasons which had not only seen five FA cup victories, but also the move from amateur to professional football and the creation of the Football League.

=== Darwen ===
Forrest joined Second Division Darwen in time for the 1895–96 season. One of the first games he played for his new club was against Rovers in a friendly at Barley Bank. He played for Darwen for one season scoring one goal before retiring from the game.

== Later career ==
After his playing days ended, Forrest became licensee of the Audley Arms Hotel in Blackburn before becoming the landlord of the County Arms on Darwen Street, Blackburn for many years. He later joined a firm of shuttle peg makers, joiners and mill furnishers.

He returned to Blackburn Rovers as an administrator, before becoming a director of the club in 1906. His son, James Henry Forrest, played for Rovers for four seasons in the 1920s. Jimmy Forrest died on 30 December 1925, aged 61.

Footnote: One source described Jimmy Forrest as an industrious half-back, whose tough tackling was matched by an intelligent reading of the game that enabled him to anticipate danger and intercept the ball before the opposition could fully develop an attack.

== Honours ==
Blackburn Rovers

- FA Cup winner (5): (1884, 1885, 1886, 1890 and 1891)
- Lancashire Senior Cup: 1884 and 1885
