= FA Cup final referees =

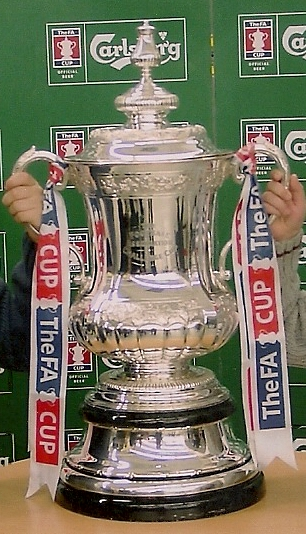
The FA Cup

In English football, the FA Cup final, which is the deciding match of the FA Cup competition, is considered the highest domestic honour for referees to be appointed to officiate.

These were the match officials from the three most recent finals:

- The 2023 final was refereed by Paul Tierney, with Neil Davies and Scott Ledger as assistant referees. Peter Bankes was fourth official and Adrian Holmes was reserve assistant referee. David Coote served as the video assistant referee (VAR), with Simon Long as his assistant.
- The 2024 final was refereed by Andrew Madley, with Harry Lennard and Nick Hopton as assistant referees. Simon Hooper and Tim Wood were fourth official and reserve assistant referee respectively. Michael Oliver served as the VAR, Peter Bankes as his assistant, and Stuart Burt as the support VAR.
- The 2025 final was refereed by Stuart Attwell, with Adam Nunn and Dan Robathan as assistant referees. Darren England and Craig Taylor were fourth official and reserve assistant referee respectively. Jarred Gillett served as the VAR, Michael Salisbury as his assistant, and Darren Cann as the support VAR.

== Selection ==
By modern tradition, individuals are appointed to referee an FA Cup Final only once, a rule that has been in practice since 1902. They may have previously appeared as an assistant referee or fourth official.

However, due to the global COVID-19 pandemic in 2020, the tradition was broken when Anthony Taylor became the first referee for over a century to officiate a second cup final. This was decided to allow a referee who would be officiating in a maiden final to experience the occasion as intended, with friends and family present and a stadium full of fans. In 2021, with the same crowd restrictions in place, Michael Oliver also refereed a second final.

David Elleray commented on his selection for the 1994 FA Cup final:

Whatever else anyone might claim, it is the biggest match of your career as you only referee the final once, you are desperate not to make a mess of it. People are often surprised to learn that you can only do it once but I thoroughly approve of the principle. It is such a special occasion that [...] it would never be as good the second time round. I strongly believe that no one should have all the big games and those who have shown themselves capable of refereeing at the highest level should receive the highest accolade of doing the Cup Final.

Referees and assistants are chosen by the Football Association for their impartiality and their assessed performance scores for previous seasons. Only one referee has ever been replaced under the impartiality rule; Mike Dean agreed to pull out following questions in the media about him being able to referee a Cup Final involving Liverpool as he is from the Wirral, a peninsula situated near the city. Alan Wiley took his place.

Officials are informed of the appointment by the FA Referees' Secretary and sworn to secrecy until a public announcement can be made, usually the following day. There then follows a period of media attention resulting in interviews and features appearing in the national press.

== Traditions ==
When the Cup Final is held at Wembley Stadium, traditions include the "Eve of the Final" rally at a central London location, where the match officials are guests of honour at a meal provided for by the Referees' Association. Many members of the Association including serving and past Cup Final referees also attend.

Speeches are made and the officials are presented with mementos of the occasion and invited to autograph their refereeing colleagues' Cup Final programmes. The referees usually sleep at White's Hotel, with FA protocol stating that they should not leave the grounds.

On the morning of the Cup Final, the officials take a pre-match walk through Hyde Park before travelling by limousine to Wembley. Once there they are obliged once more to autograph Cup Final programmes and are invited to join any VIPs in the banqueting hall.

== Fees ==
For the 2013-14 season the officials' fees for the Cup Final were: referee and assistant referees £375 each; fourth official £320 and a souvenir medal each, plus travelling expenses.

== Referees ==
=== 1872–1977 ===
Year	Referee	Assistant referees
1872	Alfred Stair	
1873	Alfred Stair	
1874	Alfred Stair	
1875	Charles Alcock	
1876	W.S. Rawson	
1877	Sidney Havell Wright	
1878	Segar Bastard	
1879	Charles Alcock	
1880	Francis Marindin	
1881	William Peirce Dix	
1882	Charles Clegg	
1883	Francis Marindin	
1884	Francis Marindin	
1885	Francis Marindin	
1886	Francis Marindin	
1887	Francis Marindin	
1888	Francis Marindin	
1889	Francis Marindin	
1890	Francis Marindin	
1891	Charles J. Hughes	
1892	Charles Clegg	
1893	Charles J. Hughes	
1894	Charles J. Hughes	
1895	John Lewis	
1896	William Simpson	
1897	John Lewis	
1898	John Lewis	
1899	Aaron Scragg	
1900	Arthur Kingscott	
1901	Arthur Kingscott	
1902	Tom Kirkham	
1903	John Adams	
1904	A. J. Barker	
1905	Pat Harrower	
1906	Fred Kirkham	
1907	Nat Whittaker	
1908	T. P. Campbell	
1909	Jim Mason	
1910	John Ibbotson	
1911	John Pearson	
1912	J. R. Schumacher	
1913	Arthur Adams	
1914	Herbert Bamlett	
1915	Harry Taylor	
1916–1919	no finals	
1920	Jack Howcroft	
1921	S. Davies	
1922	J. W. P. Fowler	
1923	D. H. Asson	R.A. Crump W.A. Moody
1924	Bill Russell	J. Cahill F.C. Winton
1925	Noel Watson	A.H. Kingscott R.T. Bradshaw
1926	I. Baker	W.P. (Percy) Harper S.F. (Stanley) Rous
1927	William Frederick Bunnell	M. Brewitt G.E. Watson
1928	T. G. Bryan	C.H. Ridgway J.E. Sayce
1929	Arnold Josephs	C.E. Lines C.F. Moon
1930	Tom Crew	W.E. Mycroft L.B. Watson
1931	Harry Kingscott	H.N. Mee W.P. (Percy) Harper
1932	W.P. (Percy) Harper	A.J. Casely W. Walden
1933	Eddie Wood	G.T. Gould F. Ratcliff
1934	Stanley Rous	G.W. Ward F.C. Wells
1935	Bert Fogg	L.E. Gibbs A.H. Leppard
1936	Harry Nattrass	J.M. (Jim) Wiltshire Dr. A.W. Barton
1937	Reg Rudd	G. Dutton E.W. Vokes
1938	Arthur James Jewell	G.C. Denton F.W. Wort
1939	Tommy Thompson	P. Snape S.A. Donaldson
1940–1945	no finals	
1946	Ernest Smith	R.A. (Reg) Mortimer G.V. Searle
1947	Jim Wiltshire	H. (Harry) Pearce H. Bryan
1948	C. Jack Barrick	R.J. (Reg) Leafe W. (Bill) Ling
1949	Reg Mortimer	R.L. Aldridge V. Rae
1950	Harry Pearce	E.S. Vickery F.W. Chadwick
1951	Bill Ling	C. Fletcher R.J. Burgess
1952	Arthur Ellis	W.H. Evans A.W. Smith
1953	Sandy Griffiths	Rev. S.V. Davis G.F.J. Sawyer
1954	Arthur Luty	P.F. Power F.S. Fiander
1955	Reg Leafe	H.J. Husband R.L. Boscombe
1956	Alf Bond	N.C. Taylor K.E. Laflin
1957	Frank Coultas	Ken Aston B. Hills
1958	Jack Sherlock	Eric Jennings S.A. Hibbs
1959	Jack Clough	Major C.H. Dennis George Readle
1960	Kevin Howley	R.H. Windle F. Reid
1961	Jack Kelly	Harry New W.J. Downey
1962	Jim Finney	R. Tinkler C.A. Brownlow
1963	Ken Aston	W.G. Handley C.H. Pegg
1964	Arthur Holland	S.B. Stoakes F.J. Bricknell
1965	Bill Clements	Norman Burtenshaw A.H. Goodfellow
1966	Jack Taylor	W. Morris E.D. Wallace
1967	Ken Dagnall	V. James K.A. Gale
1968	Leo Callaghan	B.J. Homewood W.B. Johnson
1969	George McCabe	Ken Burns F.C. Lane
1970	Eric Jennings	Bob Matthewson J.H.V. Jackson
1971	Norman Burtenshaw	Gordon Kew J. Bell
1972	David H. Smith	John Hunting C.H. Bond
1973	Ken Burns	A.E. Morrissey M.J. Bayston reserve linesman: T.G. Bune
1974	Gordon Kew	H. Davey D.L. Stantion reserve linesman: R. Driver
1975	Pat Partridge	Ron Challis G.W. Holt reserve linesman: C. Mallett
1976	Clive Thomas	Alf Grey B. Marchant reserve linesman: A. Appleby
1977	Bob Matthewson	Clive White R. Rodell reserve linesman: C.J. Riley

=== 1978–2009: Fourth official era ===
Year	Referee	Assistant referees	Fourth official	Ref(s)
1978	Derek Nippard	J. Bent; J. Lydon	W. Cleere	
1979	Ron Challis	Keith Hackett; H. Dempsey	W. Harvey	
1980	George Courtney	Alan Robinson; J. Byles	J. Cunningham	
1981	Keith Hackett	A. Jones; D. Hutchinson	J. Penrose	
1982	Clive White	A. Hamil; T. Mitchell	R. Guy	
1983	Alf Grey	Colin Downey; John Pardoe	John Connock	
1984	John Hunting	A. Saunders; N. Butler	V. Wood	
1985	Peter Willis	Terry Holbrook; D. Keen	J. Harris	
1986	Alan Robinson	Robbie Hart; Allan Gunn	C. Topliss	
1987	Neil Midgley	R. Nixon; J. Hodson	D. James	
1988	Brian Hill	Mike Pierce; G. Tyson	David Redshaw	
1989	Joe Worrall	Mike Peck; Arthur Smith	Jeff Winter	
1990	Allan Gunn	L. Watson; C. Reeve	Roger Milford	
1991	Roger Milford	P. Brennan; P. Newton	Keren Barratt	
1992	Philip Don	Rob Harris; John Hilditch	Kelvin Morton	
1993	Keren Barratt	Roy Pearson; Brian Wigginton	Roger Dilkes	
1994	David Elleray	Paul Rejer; Graham Barber	Gerald Ashby	
1995	Gerald Ashby	Mark Warren; Steve Bennett	Steve Lodge	
1996	Dermot Gallagher	Anthony Bates; Peter Walton	Paul Durkin	
1997	Steve Lodge	David Crick; David Horlick	Peter Jones	
1998	Paul Durkin	Bill Jordan; Phil Joslin	Graham Barber	
1999	Peter Jones	David Babski; Philip Sharp	Mike Riley	
2000	Graham Poll	Darren Drysdale; Graeme Atkins	Alan Wiley	
2001	Steve Dunn	Mike Tingey; Kevin Pike	Steve Bennett	
2002	Mike Riley	Glenn Turner; Ralph Bone	Mark Halsey	
2003	Graham Barber	Nigel Miller; Keith Stroud	Mike Dean	
2004	Jeff Winter	Roger East; Antony Green	Matt Messias	
2005	Rob Styles	Jim Devine; Paul Canadine	Neale Barry	
2006	Alan Wiley	Ceri Richards; Darren Cann	Phil Dowd	
2007	Steve Bennett	Peter Kirkup; Dave Bryan	Howard Webb	
2008	Mike Dean	Martin Yerby; Trevor Massey	Chris Foy	
2009	Howard Webb	Dave Richardson; Mike Mullarkey	Martin Atkinson	

=== 2010–2017: Fourth official and reserve assistant referee era ===
Year	Referee	Assistant referees	Fourth official/ Reserve assistant referee	Ref(s)
2010	Chris Foy	John Flynn; Shaun Procter-Green	Andre Marriner; Stuart Burt	
2011	Martin Atkinson	Adam Watts; Simon Beck	Lee Probert; Jake Collin	
2012	Phil Dowd	Stuart Burt; Andrew Garratt	Mike Jones; Simon Long	
2013	Andre Marriner	Stephen Child; Simon Long	Anthony Taylor; Gary Beswick	
2014	Lee Probert	Jake Collin; Mick McDonough	Kevin Friend; Simon Bennett	
2015	Jonathan Moss	Darren England; Simon Bennett	Craig Pawson; Harry Lennard	
2016	Mark Clattenburg	John Brooks; Andrew Halliday	Neil Swarbrick; Michael Salisbury	
2017	Anthony Taylor	Gary Beswick; Marc Perry	Bobby Madley; Adam Nunn	

=== 2018–present: VAR and AVAR era ===
Year	Referee	Assistant referees	Fourth official/ Reserve assistant referee	VAR/ AVAR	Ref(s)
2018	Michael Oliver	Ian Hussin; Lee Betts	Lee Mason; Constantine Hatzidakis	Neil Swarbrick; Mick McDonough	
2019	Kevin Friend	Constantine Hatzidakis; Matthew Wilkes	Graham Scott; Edward Smart	Andre Marriner; Harry Lennard	
2020	Anthony Taylor	Gary Beswick; Adam Nunn	Chris Kavanagh; Lee Betts	Stuart Attwell; Stephen Child	
2021	Michael Oliver	Stuart Burt; Simon Bennett	Stuart Attwell; Dan Cook	Chris Kavanagh; Sian Massey-Ellis	
2022	Craig Pawson	Dan Cook; Edward Smart	David Coote; Dan Robathan	Paul Tierney; Simon Bennett	
2023	Paul Tierney	Neil Davies; Scott Ledger	Peter Bankes; Adrian Holmes	David Coote; Simon Long	
2024	Andrew Madley	Harry Lennard; Nick Hopton	Simon Hooper; Tim Wood	Michael Oliver; Peter Bankes; Stuart Burt	
2025	Stuart Attwell	Adam Nunn; Dan Robathan	Darren England; Craig Taylor	Jarred Gillett; Michael Salisbury; Darren Cann	
2026	Darren England	Tim Wood; Akil Howson	Sam Barrott; Steven Meredith	Peter Bankes; Nick Hopton	

== Refereeing multiple finals ==
Referee	Number of finals	Years
Francis Marindin	9	1880, 1883, 1884, 1885, 1886, 1887, 1888, 1889, 1890
Alfred Stair	3	1872, 1873, 1874
Charles J. Hughes	3	1891, 1893, 1894
John Lewis	3	1895, 1897, 1898
Charles Alcock	2	1875, 1879
Charles Clegg	2	1882, 1892
Arthur Kingscott	2	1900, 1901
Anthony Taylor	2	2017, 2020
Michael Oliver	2	2018, 2021
