= Joseph Heyes =

English footballer

Joseph "Joe" Heyes (c. 1863 – ?) was a footballer who won the FA Cup with Blackburn Rovers in 1886.

== Personal life ==
Heyes was the son of Henry Heyes, a stonemason, and 7 years old at the time of the 1871 census. Heyes married Florence Whiteside in Blackburn on 16 July 1887. At the time his occupation was described as bricklayer, but he later became a building foreman; the couple had two daughters and two sons.

He gained an unusual triumph off the football pitch in 1889, winning two prizes at the Radcliffe and Pilkington Agricultural Show for his collie.

== Football career ==
Heyes spent his career as a half-back. He started his career with Higher Walton, whom he represented in the 1884–85 FA Cup, but before the end of the season he had been recruited by Blackburn Rovers; his first known appearance for the club was in a heated friendly against Blackburn Olympic.

He was a regular in the Rovers' run to the 1886 FA Cup final, and, in the final itself, he was forced to leave the field for a while to change his boots, after opponents West Bromwich Albion put in a protest. The match ended in a draw, and Heyes was not selected for the replay; Jimmy Douglas was brought back from the wing to play in Heyes' half-back role, and Nat Walton came into the XI in Douglas' regular wing berth. This ultimately caused something of a dilemma for the following Lancashire Senior Cup final against Bolton Wanderers, as the committee wanted to bring Heyes back into the side and move McIntyre from half-back to full-back, but goalkeeper "Herby" Arthur - unable to play - insisted on Richard Turner remaining at full-back. In order to please everyone, McIntyre was put in goal, but Rovers went down to the Wanderers 1–0.

Heyes gained some comfort by being part of the XI which won the East Lancashire Charity Cup, beating Accrington 2–1 in the final the following month, with Arthur in goal and McIntyre at full-back.

He continued to play for Rovers at half-back until the 1887–88 season, even scoring a rare goal in the FA Cup that season in a 3–0 win in the fifth round at Darwen.

Heyes' career was cut short by injury, which required an operation on his knee, leaving him "very lame".

== Honours ==
- FA Cup winner: 1886
