= 1884 FA Cup final =

Football match between Blackburn Rovers and Queen's Park 1884

- Event: 1883–84 FA Cup
Blackburn Rovers	Queen's Park
(England)	(Scotland)
2	1
- Date: 29 March 1884
- Venue: Kennington Oval, London
- Referee: Major Francis Marindin
- Attendance: 12,000

The 1884 FA Cup final was a football match between Blackburn Rovers and Queen's Park contested on 29 March 1884 at the Kennington Oval. It was the showpiece match of English football's primary cup competition, the Football Association Challenge Cup (better known as the FA Cup), it was the 13th Cup final. It was the first time that a Scottish team reached the final of the tournament, with Queen's Park knocking out the previous holders of the trophy en route.

Both teams received protests from the defeated teams following the semi-final matches, but each were turned down by the Football Association. By the time the match was played, Queen's Park had already been awarded the Scottish Cup after Vale of Leven declined to participate in the final. Prior to the match there were temporary stands built at the Oval as the Pavilion was reserved for members of the Surrey County Cricket Club. There was a record breaking attendance at the match, with between 10,000 and 12,000 fans attending making it the most attended match in London; as at the previous year's final, special trains were laid on by the railways to transport spectators from Lancashire.

The final coincided with a Scotland v Wales international match which took place in Glasgow on the same day, with the many Scottish internationals in the Queen's Park team opting play for their club team rather than their country. In the event, Scotland won the international comfortably by a scoreline of 4 goals to 1.

Despite Queen's Park entering the match as favourites, it was Blackburn Rovers who won the game by two goals to one with goals from Jimmy Douglas and Jimmy Forrest; Robert M Christie scored for Queen's Park. The Scottish team had a goal disallowed during play, and the referee later said that they had scored once more but as the players did not attempt to claim it, he had not bothered to award it. The two teams met once more in the final of the following FA Cup final in 1885.

== Route to the final ==
=== Queen's Park ===
Round	Opposition	Score	Venue
1st	Crewe Alexandra	10–0	Crewe (a)
2nd	Manchester F.C.	15–0	Glasgow (h)
3rd	Oswestry	7–1	Oswestry (a)
4th	Aston Villa	6–1	Glasgow (h)
Quarter-final	Old Westminsters	1–0	Kennington Oval (a)
Semi-final	Blackburn Olympic	4–1	Nottingham (n)

Queen's Park were invited to compete in the 1883–84 FA Cup, despite being from Scotland. They had previously been invited on several occasions from the 1871–72 competition onwards, but ultimately withdrew on each occasion. Their most successful runs had been in both 1871–72 and 1872–73 when they reached the semi-final each time before withdrawing. On each occasion since, they had withdrawn from the cup without playing any matches. Queen's 1883–84 FA Cup campaign began on 6 October 1883 with a 10–0 victory over Crewe Alexandra in the first round in front of a crowd of 2,000 spectators. The second round saw their first home game, and a 15–0 victory against Manchester F.C. on 1 December. It was the first time that an English cup match had been played in Scotland, and drew 6,000 fans. However the match was a one-sided affair, with Queen's Park dominating throughout to the extent that their goalkeeper was never required to handle the ball.

They defeated the English Welsh-border team from Oswestry in the third round, 7–1. They were drawn at home against Aston Villa in the fourth round, but the match was called into doubt when it was scheduled to take place on the same date and location as Queen's Park's match against Hibernian F.C. in the Scottish Cup. Queen's and their fellow Scottish opponents agreed to postpone the match for two weeks. There was a great deal of interest by the spectators from Birmingham, and three special trains were laid on to transport them to Glasgow for the game with more than 1200 of them travelling north of the border. Around 10,000 fans filled the ground where they watched Queen's Park defeat Aston Villa 6–1. The fifth round was their lowest scoring game of the campaign, where they won away to Old Westminsters 1–0 at the Kennington Oval in London. In the semi-final they defeated Blackburn Olympic 4–1 to set up a final against the other Blackburn-based team; the match was played at a neutral venue in Nottingham. Olympic subsequently complained to The Football Association as the crowd invaded the pitch to cause disruption for their team; the complaint was not upheld.

=== Blackburn Rovers ===
Round	Opposition	Score	Venue
1st	Southport Central	7–1	Leamington Road (h)
2nd	South Shore	7–0	Blackpool (a)
3rd	Padiham	3–0	Leamington Road (h)
4th	Staveley	5–1	Leamington Road (h)
Quarter-final	Upton Park	3–0	West Ham Park (a)
Semi-final	Notts County	1–0	Birmingham (n)

Blackburn Rovers also started their campaign in the first round, where they won their first game at home against Southport Central 7–1. The second round saw them drawn away to South Shore at Blackpool resulting in a further victory by a margin of 7–0. They defeated Padiham 3–0 in the third round, once again at their home ground of Leamington Street, and in the fourth round against Staveley 5–1 in a match which was dominated by Rovers and in front of a crowd of 3000 spectators.

Rovers won once again in an away game against Upton Park at West Ham Park by a scoreline of 3–0 in the fifth round. The match was more competitive than the scoreline might suggest, as Blackburn were a goal down at half time but won the game after a goal by John Inglis and two by Joe Lofthouse in the second half. At Birmingham in a neutral venue, they defeated Notts County in the semi-final 1–0. As with Olympic against Queen's Park, Notts also complained of events that took place during their semi-final. They argued that Rovers had illegally fielded Inglis, a player from Glasgow who had played for Glasgow Rangers and was only drafted into the Blackburn team to improve their cup performance. A letter was produced by Rovers to show that he had been expelled from Rangers because he continued to play for the English team instead. Notts wanted the match to be replayed without Inglis, but the FA did not uphold the complaint.

== Pre-match ==
Prior to the match, Queen's Park and Blackburn Rovers had met on three occasions; each time the game ended in a draw. Queen's went into the match as the favourites, being the most successful club in Scotland at that point and having developed a style of play involving short passing which was not in use in England. They had been awarded the Scottish Cup earlier in the season after Vale of Leven declined to participate in the final due to illnesses suffered by a number of their players.

Blackburn Rovers were seeking to emulate the success of rivals Blackburn Olympic, who were the current holders of the trophy, and the team that Queen's Park defeated in the semi-final. Rovers had previously reached the FA Cup final, in 1882, where they were defeated by Old Etonians. Blackburn trained during the week prior to the game by conducting practise games and going for walks. They departed for the London area by train on the day before the final; a large crowd of local supporters gathered at the train station in Blackburn to wish them well as they left. The team stayed in Richmond the night before the match and made their way into the city at lunchtime on the Saturday.

For the second year in succession, special trains were laid on for the final to transport fans down from Blackburn. However, due to issues with the Olympic fans from the previous year destroying tea-rooms at stations on the route, the railway instead closed all refreshment rooms on the line on the day of the match. Additional stands were built at the Oval for the match at both the Gasometer end and on the west side, as the Pavilion was reserved for members of the Surrey County Cricket Club.

== Match ==
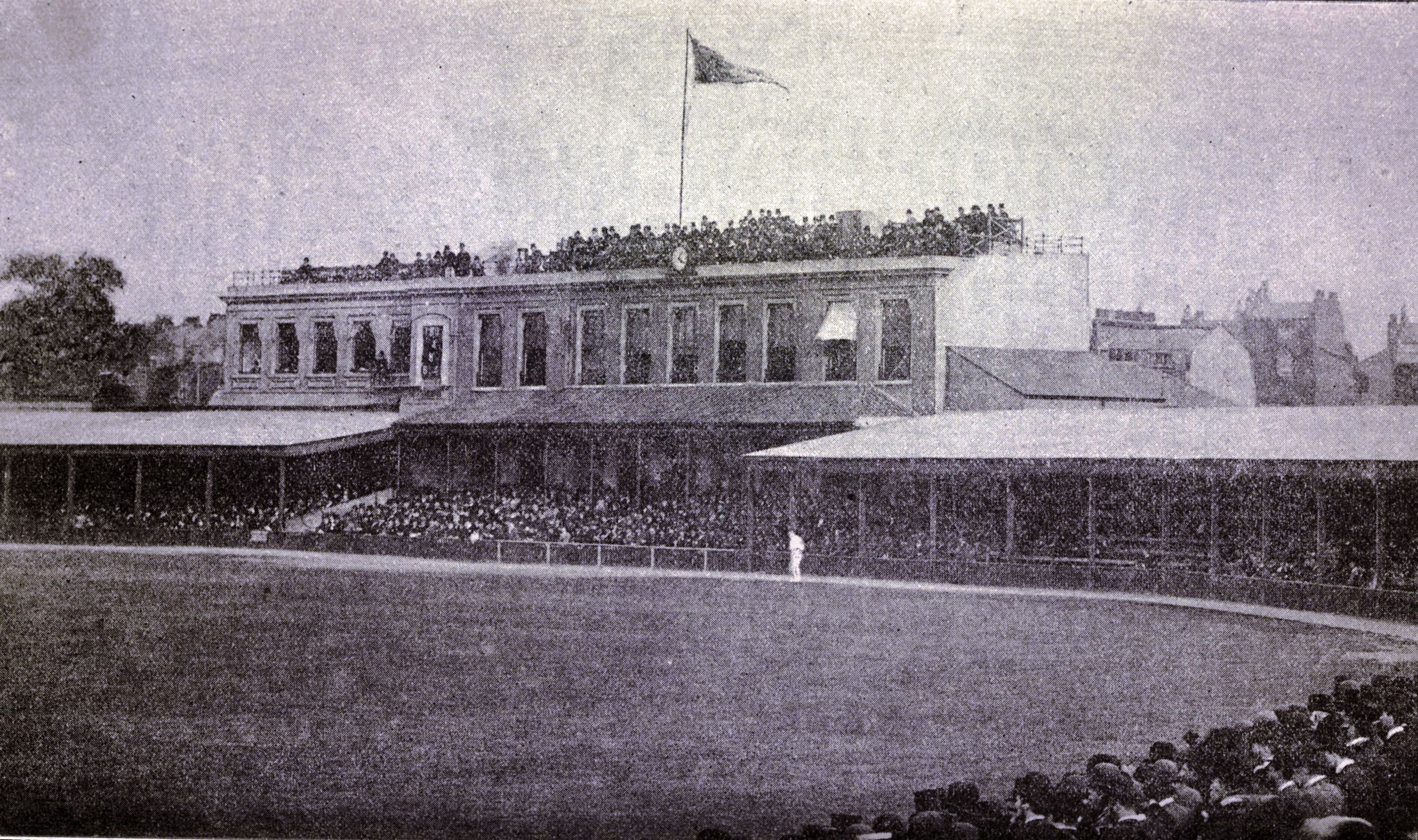
The Kennington Oval (here pictured in 1891), venue for the match

The match was refereed by Major Francis Marindin of the Royal Engineers, who was also President of the Football Association. His two umpires were Charles Wollaston of Wanderers and C. Crump of the Birmingham Football Association. According to initial estimates, there were around 10,000 to 12,000 spectators, breaking previous records for attendances in London. This was unexpected, and so there was not enough staff at the stadium to prevent the crowd from rushing through the turnstiles without paying. The weather was described as "bright and seasonable". Queen's won the coin toss and chose to defend the gasometer end. Rovers kicked off, but play quickly turned in the Scottish team's favour and they made the first two attacks. The work of Inglis and Sowerbutts saw Rovers take control of the match briefly, but Queen's Park were awarded an indirect free kick for handball inside the Blackburn half. The ball was shot straight into the Blackburn net without touching another player, and so no goal was awarded. Rovers quickly gained a corner kick but failed to score.

Queen's went on the attack once again, with Christie going on a run but losing possession to Hargreaves. After around 30 minutes of play, Sowerbutts opened the scoring, touching the ball home after Jimmy Brown went around goalkeeper George Gillespie and sent the ball rolling along the goal-line. Queen's Park then committed the second handball of the game, giving Rovers a free kick. Brown took the ball up the wing, and centred it towards Forrest, who turned the ball into the back of the Queen's Park goal and put Blackburn two ahead. In response, Queen's Park's attacks on the Blackburn defence increased, and they scored through Christie before half time.

Queen's Park took the advantage early on in the second half, and a series of rapid attacks followed the break. The Scottish team were only prevented from scoring in one goal mouth scramble by the teamwork of Arthur and Suter. Rovers appeared to have switched to a defensive posture, and conceded a further corner kick, but nothing came of it as Gow kicked it behind the goal. A further handball just inside the Queen's Park half resulted in a solitary attack for Blackburn, ending in Brown sending the ball over the crossbar. Further attacks Queen's Park followed, but one further attack from Blackburn led to a shot from Brown which many in the crowd thought crossed the line before Gillespie cleared it. Blackburn dominated the final five minutes of the game, and the match ended 2–1; all three goals were scored in the first half. The medals and trophy had been expected to be awarded by Prince Leopold, Duke of Albany, however due to his death on the day before the final, they were not presented publicly. Instead, Major Marindin handed them over in the dressing rooms.

=== Match details ===
29 March 1884
15:00 BST

Blackburn Rovers (England)	2–1	(Scotland) Queen's Park
Joe Sowerbutts; Jimmy Forrest	Report	Robert M Christie

Kennington Oval, London
Attendance: 12,000
Referee: Major Francis Marindin (Royal Engineers)

Blackburn Rovers	Queen's Park

GK	(England) Herby Arthur
FB	(Scotland) Fergus Suter
FB	(England) Joe Beverley
HB	(Scotland) Hugh McIntyre (c)
HB	(England) Jimmy Forrest
RW	(England) Joe Lofthouse
RW	(Scotland) Jimmy Douglas
LW	(England) John Hargreaves
LW	(England) James Brown
FW	(England) Joe Sowerbutts
FW	(Scotland) John Inglis

GK	(Scotland) George Gillespie
FB	(Scotland) John Macdonald
FB	(Scotland) Walter Arnott
HB	(Scotland) Charles Campbell (c)
HB	(Scotland) John Gow
RW	(Scotland) William Anderson
RW	(Scotland) William Watt
FW	(Scotland) William Harrower
FW	(Scotland) Dr. John Smith
LW	(Scotland) Robert M. Christie
LW	(Scotland) David Allan

Match rules
90 minutes.
30 minutes extra-time if scores are level, at captains' discretion.
Replay if scores still level.
No substitutes.

== Post-match ==
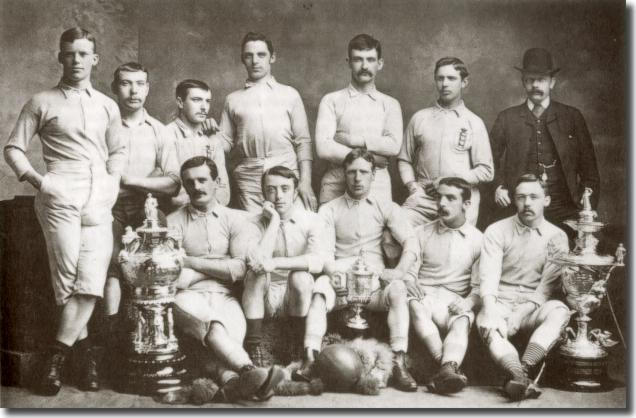
The 1883–84 Blackburn Rovers team, with the East Lancashire Charity Cup; the FA Cup and the Lancashire Cup

Following the match, the referee admitted that at one point during the game the ball had passed the Blackburn goal line, but as Queen's Park did not attempt to claim the goal, it was not awarded. Queen's Park would ultimately become the only Scottish club to reach the final of the FA Cup, although they returned the following year where they again faced Blackburn Rovers.

Following their victory in the FA Cup final, Blackburn Rovers played Blackburn Olympic in the final of the Lancashire Association Cup where Rovers won once again 2–1. The 1884 FA Cup was the first of a winning streak for Rovers, with the team retaining the trophy for the following two seasons, by first defeating Queen's Park again in 1885 and then West Bromwich Albion following a replay in 1886. This run was ended in the second round of the 1886-87 FA Cup when Rovers played another Scottish team, Renton. After an initial 2–2 draw played at Queen's Park's ground at Hampden Park, Renton were victorious in the replay.
