= 1885 FA Cup final =

- Event: 1884–85 FA Cup
Blackburn Rovers	Queen's Park
(England)	(Scotland)
2	0
- Date: 4 April 1885
- Venue: Kennington Oval, London
- Referee: Major Francis Marindin
- Attendance: 12,500

The 1885 FA Cup final was a football match between Blackburn Rovers and Queen's Park on 4 April 1885 at Kennington Oval in London. It was the fourteenth final of the world's oldest football competition, the Football Association Challenge Cup (known in the modern era as the FA Cup). Blackburn had won the Cup in the previous season while Queen's Park were competing in their second final with the previous final being previous year. Rovers won 2–0 in their second successive FA Cup final victory, with the goals coming from Jimmy Forrest and James Brown. This would be the only final in which two clubs met in consecutive FA Cup finals until Manchester City and Manchester United in 2023 and 2024, albeit with a contrasting result.

== Match details ==
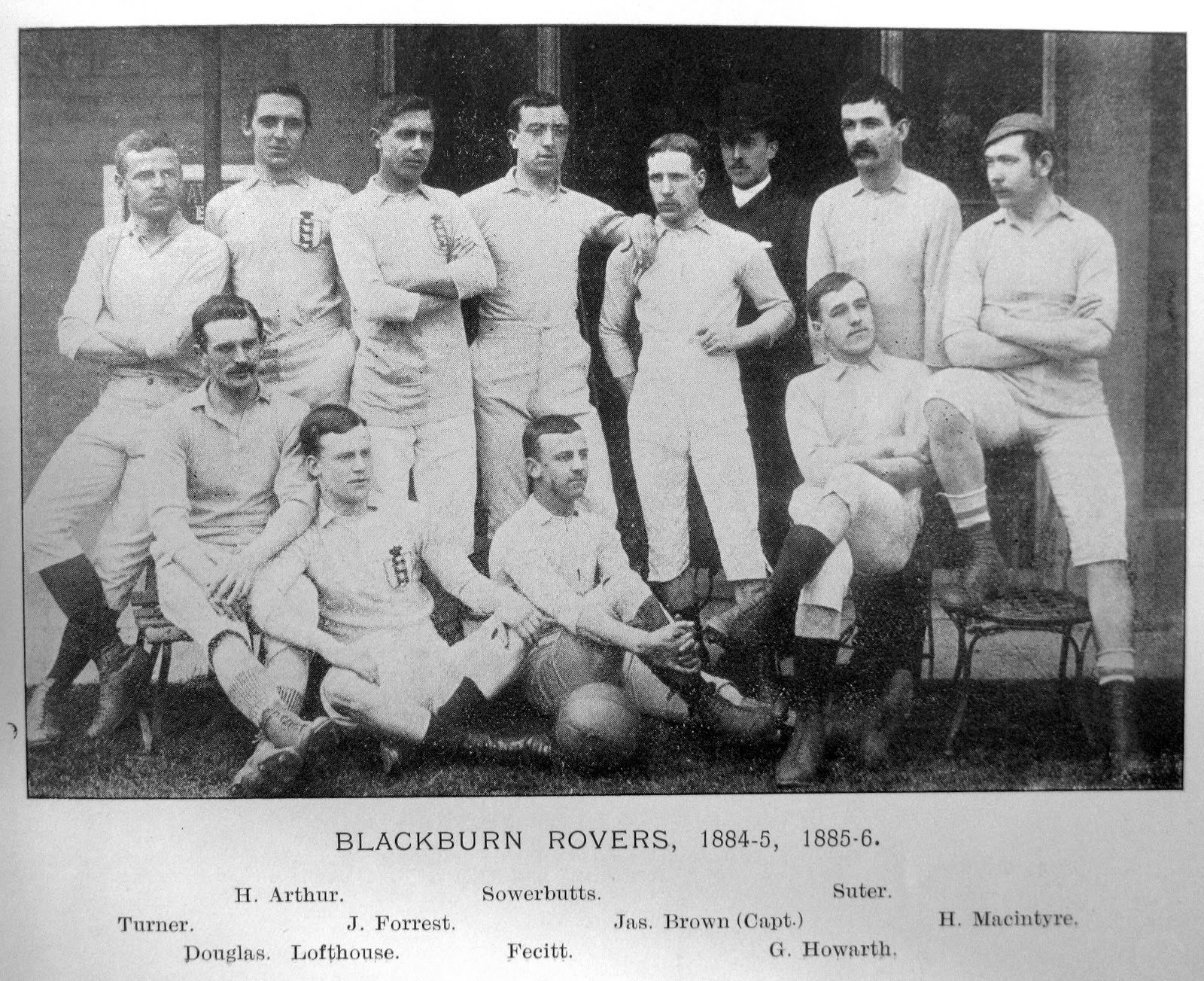
Blackburn Rovers, winning side

4 April 1885

Blackburn Rovers	2–0	Queen's Park
Forrest; Brown

Kennington Oval, London
Attendance: 12,500
Referee: Francis Marindin

Blackburn Rovers	Queen's Park

Blackburn Rovers
GK	Herby Arthur
RB	Richard Turner
LB	Fergus Suter
RH	George Haworth
CH	Hugh McIntyre
LH	Jimmy Forrest
OR	Jimmy Douglas
IR	Joe Lofthouse
CF	James Brown (c)
IL	Joe Sowerbutts
OL	Howard Fecitt

Queens Park
GK	George Gillespie
RB	Walter Arnott
LB	William McLeod
CH	Charles Campbell (c)
CH	John Macdonald
OR	Ninian MacWhannell
IR	William Anderson
CF	Alexander Hamilton
CF	William Sellar
IL	David Allan
OL	Woodville Gray
