= 1886 FA Cup final =

British association football match

- Event: 1885–86 FA Cup
| Blackburn Rovers | West Bromwich Albion |
- Blackburn Rovers won after a replay

Final
| Blackburn Rovers | West Bromwich Albion |
| 0 | 0 |
- Date: 3 April 1886
- Venue: Kennington Oval, London
- Referee: Francis Marindin
- Attendance: 17,000

Replay
| Blackburn Rovers | West Bromwich Albion |
| 2 | 0 |
- Date: 10 April 1886
- Venue: Racecourse Ground, Derby
- Referee: Francis Marindin
- Attendance: 12,000

The 1886 FA Cup final was a football match between Blackburn Rovers and West Bromwich Albion on Saturday, 3 April 1886 at Kennington Oval in south London. The result was a goalless draw. Albion wanted to play extra time but Blackburn declined and so a replay was necessary. This took place a week later at the Racecourse Ground in Derby, the first venue outside London to stage an FA Cup final match. Blackburn won 2–0 to win the tournament for the third successive time. Following Wanderers (1876–1878), Blackburn were the second team to win three successive finals and, as of 2023, remain the last to do so. Their goals were scored by Jimmy Brown and Joe Sowerbutts. Both matches were refereed by Major Francis Marindin.

The replay was the final match of the 1885–86 FA Cup, the 15th edition of the world's oldest football knockout competition, and England's primary cup competition, the Football Association Challenge Cup, better known as the FA Cup. Blackburn were making their fourth (of eight) appearances in the final; Albion their first (of ten). It was the first final to involve two extant clubs who are still members of either the Premier League or the English Football League.

== Route to the final ==
=== Blackburn Rovers ===
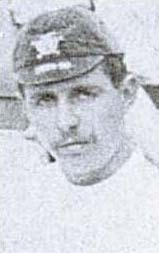
Blackburn's Jimmy Forrest was a five-time winner of the FA Cup.

Following their debut in 1879–80, this was the seventh time Blackburn Rovers played in the FA Cup. Having been runners-up in 1881–82, they had won the competition in both 1883–84 and 1884–85. Blackburn began the 1885–86 tournament with an away tie (Note: In English football, a match between two teams in a knockout tournament such as the FA Cup is known as a "tie". This has no connection with a tie (draw), which is a result with identical scores or points.) at nearby Clitheroe. They won this 2–0 and then had three successive home ties before being awarded a bye through the fifth round (the last sixteen) to the quarter-finals. They were drawn away to Brentwood at the Essex County Cricket Ground where Blackburn won 3–1 to reach the semi-finals. This match, played on 13 March at the Derbyshire County Cricket Ground, was against Swifts. Blackburn won 2–1 with goals scored by Nat Walton and Thomas Strahan.

Blackburn Rovers
| Round | Opposition | Score |
|---|---|---|
| 1st | Clitheroe (a) | 2–0 |
| 2nd | Oswaldtwistle Rovers (h) | 1–0 |
| 3rd | Darwen Old Wanderers (h) | 6–1 |
| 4th | Staveley (h) | 7–1 |
| 5th | bye | |
| 6th | Brentwood (a) | 3–1 |
| Semi-final | Swifts (n) | 2–1 |

=== West Bromwich Albion ===
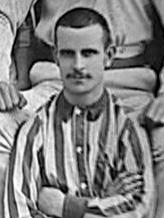
In the sixth round, Jem Bayliss scored Albion's first FA Cup hat-trick.

West Bromwich Albion made their FA Cup debut in 1883–84 and this was their third season in the competition. They were drawn at home in every round prior to the semi-final. In the first two rounds, they defeated Aston Unity 4–1 and Wednesbury Old Athletic 3–2. They received a bye to the fourth round, where they beat Wolverhampton Wanderers 3–1. Old Carthusians were defeated by a single goal in the fifth round. A hat-trick from Jem Bayliss—the first by an Albion player in the FA Cup—contributed to a 6–0 quarter-final victory over Old Westminsters, putting Albion into the FA Cup semi-final for the first time (they had reached the quarter-final in 1884–85). The semi-final took place at Aston Lower Grounds and was against one of Albion's local rivals, Small Heath Alliance. Albion won 4–0—Arthur Loach and George Woodhall each scoring twice—to become the first Midlands club to reach the FA Cup Final. After the game, Small Heath supporters invaded the pitch and then pelted missiles at vehicles bound for West Bromwich, causing several injuries.

West Bromwich Albion
| Round | Opposition | Score |
|---|---|---|
| 1st | Aston Unity (h) | 4–1 |
| 2nd | Wednesbury Old Athletic (h) | 3–2 |
| 3rd | bye | |
| 4th | Wolverhampton Wanderers (h) | 3–1 |
| 5th | Old Carthusians (h) | 1–0 |
| 6th | Old Westminsters (h) | 6–0 |
| Semi-final | Small Heath Alliance (n) | 4–0 |

== Match ==
=== Pre-match ===
The 1886 final was the first to involve two extant clubs who are still members of either the Premier League or the English Football League. The match took place on the same day as the University Boat Race and, in its Sporting Intelligence section the following Monday, the Daily News reported that the kick-off was delayed until four o'clock so that people attending the Boat Race would be able to see the final too. The newspaper said the crowd was "probably the largest to attend an FA Cup final".

=== Final ===
The syndicated match report, published in each of the Daily News, The Morning Post and The Standard, said there was "an immense number of spectators, numbering about 17,000".

According to the Daily News, Blackburn refused to play extra time because they realised that Albion "had the better of them". The FA said the replay would be the following Saturday, 10 April, at either Derby or Kennington. The Standard, however, correctly specified Derby as the replay venue.

=== Replay ===
The replay in Derby on 10 April was the first FA Cup final match to be played outside London. There were fears that the match would have to be postponed when Derby was hit by a blizzard that morning, but it blew over and the snow had thawed before the kick-off was due. Albion supporters carried cards saying "Play Up Throstles". Nat Walton played for Blackburn instead of Joseph Heys. Albion were unchanged.

== Details ==
=== Final ===
3 April 1886
16:00 GMT

| Blackburn Rovers | 0–0 | West Bromwich Albion |

Kennington Oval, London
Attendance: 17,000
Referee: Major F. A. Marindin, RE
Umpires: M. P. Betts (Kent) and
J. C. Clegg (Sheffield)

| Blackburn; Rovers | West Bromwich; Albion |

| GK | (England) Herbie Arthur |
| RB | (Scotland) Richard Turner |
| LB | (Scotland) Fergus Suter |
| RH | (England) Jimmy Forrest |
| CH | (Scotland) Hugh McIntyre |
| LH | (England) Joseph Heyes |
| OR | (Scotland) Jimmy Douglas |
| IR | (England) Thomas Strachan |
| CF | (England) Jimmy Brown (captain) |
| IL | (England) Joe Sowerbutts |
| OL | (England) Howard Fecitt |
Club secretary:
(Scotland) Thomas Mitchell

| GK | (England) Bob Roberts |
| RB | (England) Harry Bell |
| LB | (England) Harry Green |
| RH | (England) Ezra Horton |
| CH | (England) Charlie Perry |
| LH | (England) George Timmins |
| OR | (England) George Woodhall |
| IR | (England) Tommy Green |
| CF | (England) Jem Bayliss (captain) |
| IL | (England) Arthur Loach |
| OL | (England) George Bell |
Club secretary:
Team selection by committee only (till 1890)

Match rules

- 90 minutes duration (two halves of 45 minutes each; teams change ends at half-time). (Note: The duration of a football match has been 90 minutes since an agreement in 1866 for the match between London and Sheffield.)
- No extra time if scores level at end of normal time. (Note: The FA introduced the option of extra time into its rules in 1897.) Result to be settled by replay at a later date. (Note: The 1875 final was the first in which a replay took place; this method of deciding the winners continued until 1999. The 2005 final was the first to be settled by penalty shoot-out.)
- No substitutes allowed. (Note: Although there were isolated instances of substitution in earlier times, it was not until the beginning of the 1965–66 season that substitutes were first allowed in English top-class matches, and then only for replacement of injured players.)

Notes

- Players are listed above according to their positions on the field. There was no shirt numbering in 1886. (Note: The first known instance of shirt numbering in English football was in March 1914. It was not until the 1939–40 season that a numbering system was formally introduced.)

=== Replay ===
10 April 1886
15:00 GMT

| Blackburn Rovers | 2–0 | West Bromwich Albion |
|---|---|---|
| Brown; Sowerbutts |

Racecourse Ground, Derby
Attendance: 12,000
Referee: Major F. A. Marindin, RE
Umpires: (tbc) M. P. Betts (Kent) and
J. C. Clegg (Sheffield)

| Blackburn Rovers | West Bromwich Albion |

| GK | (England) Herbie Arthur |
| RB | (Scotland) Richard Turner |
| LB | (Scotland) Fergus Suter |
| RH | (England) Jimmy Forrest |
| CH | (Scotland) Hugh McIntyre |
| LH | (England) Nat Walton |
| OR | (Scotland) Jimmy Douglas |
| IR | (England) Thomas Strachan |
| CF | (England) Jimmy Brown (captain) |
| IL | (England) Joe Sowerbutts |
| OL | (England) Howard Fecitt |
Club secretary:
(Scotland) Thomas Mitchell

| GK | (England) Bob Roberts |
| RB | (England) Harry Bell |
| LB | (England) Harry Green |
| RH | (England) Ezra Horton |
| CH | (England) Charlie Perry |
| LH | (England) George Timmins |
| OR | (England) George Woodhall |
| IR | (England) Tommy Green |
| CF | (England) Jem Bayliss (captain) |
| IL | (England) Arthur Loach |
| OL | (England) George Bell |
Club secretary:
Team selection by committee only (till 1890)

Match rules

- 90 minutes duration (two halves of 45 minutes each; teams change ends at half-time).
- No extra time if scores level at end of normal time. Result to be settled by replay at a later date.
- No substitutes allowed.

Notes

- Players are listed above according to their positions on the field. There was no shirt numbering in 1886.

== See also ==
- 1885–86 West Bromwich Albion F.C. season

== Sources ==
- Collett, Mike (2003). The Complete Record of the FA Cup. Cheltenham: SportsBooks Ltd. ISBN 978-18-99807-19-2.
- McOwan, Gavin (2002). The Essential History of West Bromwich Albion. Headline. ISBN 978-07-55311-46-0.
- Matthews, Tony; Mackenzie, Colin (1987). Albion! A Complete Record of West Bromwich Albion 1879–1987. Breedon Books. ISBN 978-09-07969-23-5.
- Matthews, Tony (2007). West Bromwich Albion: The Complete Record. Breedon Books. ISBN 978-18-59835-65-4.
