= Thomas Strachan =

English footballer

Personal information
- Full name: Thomas Strachan
- Date of birth: c. 1860
- Place of birth: Blackburn, England
- Date of death: ?
- Place of death: Padiham, England
- Position: Forward

Youth career
- –1881: Witton

Senior career*
Years	Team	Apps	(Gls)
1881–84	Blackburn Rovers		
1884–85	Burnley		
1885–86	Blackburn Rovers		
1886–87	Witton		
1887–88	Darwen		
1888–89	Blackburn Olympic		
1889	Witton		
- * Club domestic league appearances and goals

Thomas "Tot" Strachan was a footballer who won the FA Cup with Blackburn Rovers in 1886. His surname was also rendered as Strahan.

== Personal life ==
Strachan was the son of a Thomas Strachan, a joiner, and Mary Strachan. His exact birth date is not known, but census records show he was born in about 1860.

== Football career ==
He generally played as centre-forward and was known for his pace.

Strachan had a varied career with various Lancastrian clubs. He started out at Witton, before being poached by the wealthy Blackburn Rovers, the club most adept at finding ways around the rules on professionalism thanks to its backers providing sinecure jobs for footballers; Strachan was found employment as a "cotton twister". He made his debut for Rovers in a 7–0 win over Bolton Wanderers in October 1881.

In 1883–84, he was a regular in the Rovers side, and played in most of the rounds of the club's Cup run to the final, as well as in the side which won the Lancashire Senior Cup final by beating Blackburn Olympic. However, he was replaced by Joe Sowerbutts for the final. He at least had the consolation of the club giving him £10 17/5 as a wediding present (more than the club gave to Fergus Suter), but he finished the season guesting for Great Lever, and in 1884–85 joined Burnley, just as the F.A. took a more stringent line on professionalism. Burnley was one of several Lancastrian sides to withdraw from the 1884–85 FA Cup as a result.

Blackburn Rovers however had continued to find ways around the ban on professionalism, whilst still claiming to be staunch amateurs, and for the 1885–86 season, with Great Lever making moves to sign Strachan, the Rovers instead swooped to bring him back. He scored in the 2–0 win at Clitheroe in the first round of the 1885–86 FA Cup, and next scored in the semi-final win over Swifts, bundling a cross from Sowerbutts through the goal. Strachan also played in both the original final and the replay win against West Bromwich Albion, although he was now playing on the right-wing.

After finally picking up a Cup-winners' medal, for 1886–87 he re-joined the newly-ambitious Witton, by which time he was playing on the right, but only stayed there for a season before joining Darwen. In 1888 he joined the moribund Blackburn Olympic, and on the final collapse of that club returned yet again to Witton, although he does not seem to have played after appearing in a 5–0 defeat at Sheffield Wednesday.

== Post-football life ==
Strachan was something of a local celebrity and joker; on one occasion, when he mistook a finger-bowl for a drink, he claimed that he had tasted "woss soup, many a time".

Strachan was married to Elizabeth Smith on 24 February 1883. The couple had a son, Herbert, in 1900, by which time they were living in Padiham and Strachan was still working as a twister. His exact birth and death dates are unknown; he does not appear in the 1911 census.

== Honours ==
- FA Cup winner: 1886
- Lancashire Senior Cup winner: 1884
