= Joe Lofthouse =

English footballer

Personal information
- Full name: Joseph Morris Lofthouse
- Date of birth: 14 April 1865
- Place of birth: Blackburn, England
- Date of death: 10 June 1919 (aged 54)
- Position: Forward

Senior career*
Years	Team	Apps	(Gls)
1882–1888	Blackburn Rovers		
1888–1889	Accrington	21	(2)
1889–1891	Blackburn Rovers	51	(18)
1892	Darwen	8	(1)
1893–1894	Walsall Town Swifts	33	(4)

International career
1885–1887	England	7	(2)
- * Club domestic league appearances and goals

Joseph Morris Lofthouse (14 April 1865 – 10 June 1919) was an English footballer.

== Playing career ==
Joseph Lofthouse was born in Blackburn on 14 April 1865. A talented footballer he joined Blackburn Rovers, in 1882, from King's Own Lancaster Regiment who he signed for as a Youth player in 1881. Although only 18 years old he was a member of the team in the 1883–84 season.

After Blackburn Rovers beat Notts County in the semi-final of the FA Cup, the club made an official complaint to the Football Association (FA) that John Inglis was a professional player. The FA carried out an investigation into the case discovered that Inglis was working as a mechanic in Glasgow and was not earning a living playing football for Blackburn. Blackburn faced Queens Park in the final at the Oval. Lofthouse played at left-half. The Scottish club scored the first goal but Blackburn Rovers won the game with goals from Blackburn lads, James Forrest and Joe Sowerbutts. That year Blackburn Rovers also won the Lancashire Cup and the Lancashire Charity Cup.

Blackburn Rovers beat Old Carthusians 5–0 in the semi-final of the 1885 FA Cup. Once again they had to play Queens Park in the final. Blackburn Rovers was now a team full of internationals, including Jimmy Douglas, Hugh McIntyre, James Forrest, Herbie Arthur, Lofthouse and Jimmy Brown. A crowd in excess of 12,000 arrived at the Oval to see what most people believed were the best two clubs in England and Scotland. Lofthouse played at inside right and with goals from Brown and Forrest, Blackburn Rovers won 2–0.

Joe Lofthouse won his first international cap for England against Ireland on 28 February 1885. England won 4–0 with Lofthouse scoring one of the goals. Over the next five years Lofthouse played scored three goals in seven internationals. He played against Ireland (3), Wales (2) and Scotland (2).

The first season of the Football League began on 8 September 1888 and Joe was now playing for Accrington. Joe played on the right-wing in his debut match at Anfield, then home of Everton. Accrington lost 2–1. Joe Lofthouse scored his debut League goal at Trent Bridge, then home of Notts County, on 3 November 1888. He scored one of Accrington' three goals in a match that ended as a 3–3 draw. Joe Lofthouse only missed one League match of the 22 played by Accrington in season 1888–89 and scored two League goals. Lofthouse played as a winger in a midfield that achieved a big (three-League-goals-or-more) win once. It was his only season with Accrington. Preston North End won the first championship that year without losing a single match and acquired the name the "Invincibles". Blackburn Rovers, who had lost most of their best players to retirement, finished in 4th place, 14 points behind Preston.

At the beginning of the 1889–90 season Tom Mitchell, the club secretary, recruited four top players from Scotland: Tom Brandon, Johnny Forbes, George Dewar and Harry Campbell. A local lad, Nat Walton was also drafted into the side. Other key players that season included Lofthouse and Jack Southworth. Blackburn did slightly better in the league, finishing in 3rd place, six points behind Preston. However, they won the 1890 FA Cup Final, beating The Wednesday 6–1 with Billy Townley scoring a hat trick. Other goals came from Lofthouse, Nat Walton and Jack Southworth.

Joe Lofthouse scored 18 goals in 51 games for Blackburn Rovers in the Football League. He left in 1891 to join Darwen. He also played for Walsall Town before retiring from playing in 1894. He also worked as coach of Magyar Athletic Club in Budapest and a trainer at Everton. Joe Lofthouse died in 1919.

== Honours ==
Blackburn Rovers

- FA Cup winner: 1884, 1885, 1890, 1891

== Statistics ==
Appearances and goals by club, season and competition
Club	Season	League			FA Cup		Total	
Club	Season	Division	Apps	Goals	Apps	Goals	Apps	Goals
Accrington	1888–89	The Football League	21	2	2	0	23	2
Blackburn Rovers	1889–90	Football League	18	11	5	1	23	12
Blackburn Rovers	1890–91	Football League	20	4	6	0	26	4
Blackburn Rovers	1891–92	Football League	13	3	-	-	13	3
Darwen	1892–93	Second Division	8	1	-	-	8	1
Walsall Town Swifts	1893–94	Second Division	13	2	-	-	13	2
Walsall Town Swifts	1894–95	Second Division	20	2	1	0	21	2
