= Jimmy Douglas (Scottish footballer) =

Scottish footballer

Personal information
- Full name: James Douglas
- Date of birth: 3 September 1859
- Place of birth: Renfrew, Scotland
- Date of death: 13 September 1919 (aged 60)
- Place of death: Renfrew, Scotland
- Position: Half-back

Senior career*
Years	Team	Apps	(Gls)
1878–1879	Paisley Institution		
1879–1880	Renfrew		
1880	Barrow Rangers		
1880–1892	Blackburn Rovers	34	(0)

International career
1880	Scotland	1	(0)
- * Club domestic league appearances and goals

James Douglas (3 September 1859 – 13 September 1919) was a Scottish footballer who played in the English Football League for Blackburn Rovers.

The first football club to sign Douglas was Paisley Institution. There appear to be no records about this club. In 1879 he was signed by hometown team Renfrew (which existed from 1875 until 1891). In 1880, Douglas became the club's first and only international, playing for Scotland in an international friendly against Wales which Scotland won 5–1.

Douglas left Renfrew in 1880 and headed south to England (meaning he was no longer eligible for further Scotland caps under the conventions of the time). There he joined Barrow Rangers (not today's Barrow Rangers), but after a short spell he signed for Blackburn Rovers.

Douglas was one of a triumvirate of Scottish professionals, alongside Fergus Suter and Hugh McIntyre, who provided the backbone of Blackburn Rovers' FA Cup success of the 1880s. To circumvent the rules on professionalism Douglas was found employment at Yate's Iron Foundry in the town and he quickly became a popular member of the club. His enthusiastic approach to the game was noted by the correspondent of the Blackburn Times in April 1882, when it was reported that Douglas 'is a bold player, and when fortune seems against the team becomes reckless of danger, dashing forward against any odds. He is an excellent wing player, and he and his partner understand each other perfectly. He divides with McIntyre the kicks from the right corner flag, and is frequently exceedingly successful in making them. In shooting at goal he is rather too apt to send the leather over the bar, but is, nevertheless, dangerous in front of goal, and is very valuable in a scrimmage'. His success was all the more remarkable because of his small build, but, in an era when brute force often triumphed over finesse, his Scot had sufficient skill to be able to make his mark on the game. When Douglas first joined Blackburn he operated on the right wing of a six–man attack, but when the club adopted the five–man front line he dropped back to right–half. Indeed, his versatility was such that he was drafted into the pivotal centre–half position on more than one occasion and was able to operate with supreme ease in this more demanding role.

Douglas played in the first of four FA Cup Finals at Kennington Oval on 25 March 1882, when Blackburn Rovers became the first team to play in the event who were not based in the Home Counties or London. Blackburn lost 1–0 to Old Etonians in the 1882 FA Cup Final and Douglas played as a forward. He next played in the 1884 FA Cup Final when the opponents were Queen's Park of Glasgow; Rovers won 2–1 and Douglas played on the wing. Douglas's third Final was on 4 April 1885 when again Blackburn Rovers faced Queen's Park, winning 2–0. Douglas played as a forward. The 1886 FA Cup Final was an all–English affair when on 3 April 1886 Blackburn Rovers drew 0–0 with West Bromwich Albion. Douglas played as a forward. The replay was the following week and Rovers won 2–0 with Douglas as a forward again.

== Season 1888-1889 ==
Douglas made his League debut on 15 September 1888, playing as a wing-half against Accrington at Leamington Road, then home of Blackburn Rovers. The match ended in a 5–5 draw. He only missed one of the 21 League games played in season 1888–89, as Blackburn finished fourth. Douglas appeared in the two 1888–89 FA Cup semi-final matches Blackburn played against Wolverhampton Wanderers, which Blackburn lost after a replay.

At the end of his career, in 1892, Douglas had played 76 first–class matches (34 League matches and 42 FA Cup ties) for Blackburn Rovers, scoring eight goals, all in FA Cup ties.
