= Joe Sowerbutts (footballer) =

English footballer

Personal information
- Full name: Joseph Edward Sowerbutts
- Date of birth: 25 November 1863
- Place of birth: Blackburn, England
- Date of death: 26 February 1935 (aged 71)
- Place of death: Blackburn, England
- Position: Forward

Senior career*
Years	Team	Apps	(Gls)
1883–87	Blackburn Rovers		
1887–88	Church		
- * Club domestic league appearances and goals

Joseph Edward Sowerbutts (25 November 1863 – 26 February 1935) was an English footballer who won three FA Cup winners' medals when playing for Blackburn Rovers in the 1880s.

== Playing career ==
Sowerbutts was born in Blackburn and brought up in the Shear Brow district. He played with Rovers as a reserve player before his promotion to the first team in 1883, making his debut in the 1883–84 FA Cup first round against Southport as a replacement at centre-forward for Jimmy Brown; Sowerbutts scored one of the goals in a 7–0 romp. Brown returned for the second round against South Shore but Sowerbutts kept his place at the expense of Tot Strachan, and rewarded the Rovers' selectors by scoring twice, in another seven-goal win.

Strachan returned to the side for the quarter- and semi-final, but Sowerbutts was back in his place for the cup final, played at the Kennington Oval on 29 March, against Queen's Park. Sowerbutts opened the scoring in a 2–1 win, touching the ball home after Brown took the ball past goalkeeper George Gillespie and sent it rolling along the goal-line.

It was Rovers' first FA Cup win, and the club would go on to win the next two competitions, Sowerbutts playing in both finals. Indeed, he scored the second and decisive goal in the 1886 final against West Bromwich Albion, beating both goalkeeper Roberts and defender Green who had gone back to defend the goal-line, with a smart shot - he put the ball through the goal a second time but it was disallowed for offside, although there was a suspicion he had been played onside by the final touch before reaching him being made by a defender.

In this last season, the Football Association had permitted players to turn professional, and he did not appear in the FA Cup again; he was chosen for the first-round tie with Halliwell in 1886–87, but, unable to field its first-choice XI because of residency rules, Halliwell scratched and the game was played as a friendly.

Although he played further matches during the 1886–87 season for Rovers, he appears to have stepped back from the front rank of football as a result of the advent of professionalism, turning out for the lower-key Church in 1887–88. He made a one-off comeback with Rovers in a benefit match at South Shore in 1890, in which the Rovers needed to call up several replacements for unavailable first-team players.

== Later life ==
Sowerbutts became an insurance clerk at the Blackburn Philanthropic Mutual Assurance Society, and was also an election agent for the Conservative Party in Blackburn; he remained a Rovers supporter for his whole life. He married Annette Leaver on 30 January 1896 at St James in Blackburn.

By 1911 he was spelling his surname as Sourbutts and he died on 26 February 1935, at the Blackburn and East Lancashire Royal Infirmary, after falling ill at work. His estate of £269 was left to his widow.

== Honours ==
- FA Cup winner: 1884, 1885, 1886
