= Dermot Gallagher =

Irish football referee (born 1957)

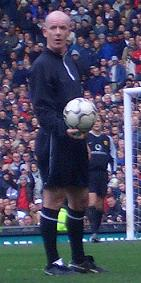
- Born: 20 May 1957 (age 69); Dublin, Ireland

Domestic
Years	League	Role
1985–1990	Football League	Asst. referee
1990–1992	Football League	Referee
1992–2007	Premier League	Referee

International
Years	League	Role
1994–2002	FIFA listed	Referee

Dermot Gallagher (born 20 May 1957) is a retired Irish association football referee based in Banbury, Oxfordshire. He refereed in the Premier League of English football until May 2007.

== Career ==
Gallagher first took up the whistle in 1978 at the suggestion of an ex-Football League linesman called Dick Bartlett. He was elected to the assistant referees' list of the Football League in 1985. Five years later he became a Football League referee at the age of thirty-three. By his second season he was regularly handling top division games and was chosen for the new Premier League in 1992. He progressed to the FIFA list in 1994 after only three and a half seasons on the list.

His first ever Premiership appointment was the 2–0 away win by Coventry at Spurs on 19 August 1992, both goals being scored by John Williams.

In 1995, he refereed the FA Charity Shield match between Everton and Blackburn Rovers at Wembley, which Everton won with a Vinny Samways goal. In the same year, he refereed the FA Trophy Final, also at Wembley, when Woking beat Kidderminster Harriers 2–1 after extra time. Later that year he was in charge of the Under 20 World Cup Final in Qatar, which was won by Argentina in a 2–0 victory over Brazil.

In 1996, he was selected to control the FA Cup Final between Liverpool and Manchester United at Wembley, which United won by an Eric Cantona goal to nil. That summer he refereed in the European Championships in England. However, he suffered a serious injury during a game and was then out of action until early 1997.

Despite being born in the Republic of Ireland, Gallagher was a representative of the (English) Football Association, and as such he was able to referee a friendly international between his birth country, the Republic of Ireland, and Russia on 13 February 2002 at Lansdowne Road. Referees are prohibited from officiating in international fixtures involving their representative country. He retired from the FIFA List on reaching the mandatory retirement age of forty-five at the end of that year. Since retiring Gallagher often attends matches supporting the Republic of Ireland football team.

Gallagher served out several more years as a Premier League referee with the unique distinction of having served on it every season since its inception. He was the first referee since 1994 to be granted an extension beyond the domestic retirement age of forty-eight in 2006.

Since the year 2006, he has officiated in the annual series of national six-a-side tournaments called Masters football, referees for which are FA-endorsed. This competition features ex-professional footballers chosen by the PFA, and is televised on Sky TV.

The last Premier League fixture that he refereed was the game between Liverpool and Charlton Athletic, which took place on 13 May 2007 and finished 2–2.

== Statistics ==
Season	Games	Total (yellow card)	(yellow card) per game	Total (red card)	(red card) per game
1992–93	7	9	1.28	0	0.00
1995–96	21	40	1.90	2	0.09
1997–98	29	71	2.44	2	0.06
1998–99	33	98	2.96	5	0.15
1999–2000	35	89	2.54	6	0.17
2000–01	39	100	2.56	8	0.20
2001–02	34	88	2.58	4	0.11
2002–03	35	107	3.05	5	0.14
2003–04	34	77	2.26	6	0.17
2004–05	36	80	2.22	5	0.13
2005–06	43	96	2.23	9	0.20
2006–07	32	61	1.90	5	0.15

== See also ==
- List of football referees
- Premier League All Stars

Preceded by Gerald Ashby	FA Cup Final referee 1996	Succeeded by Stephen Lodge
