= Darren Cann (assistant referee) =

English football referee

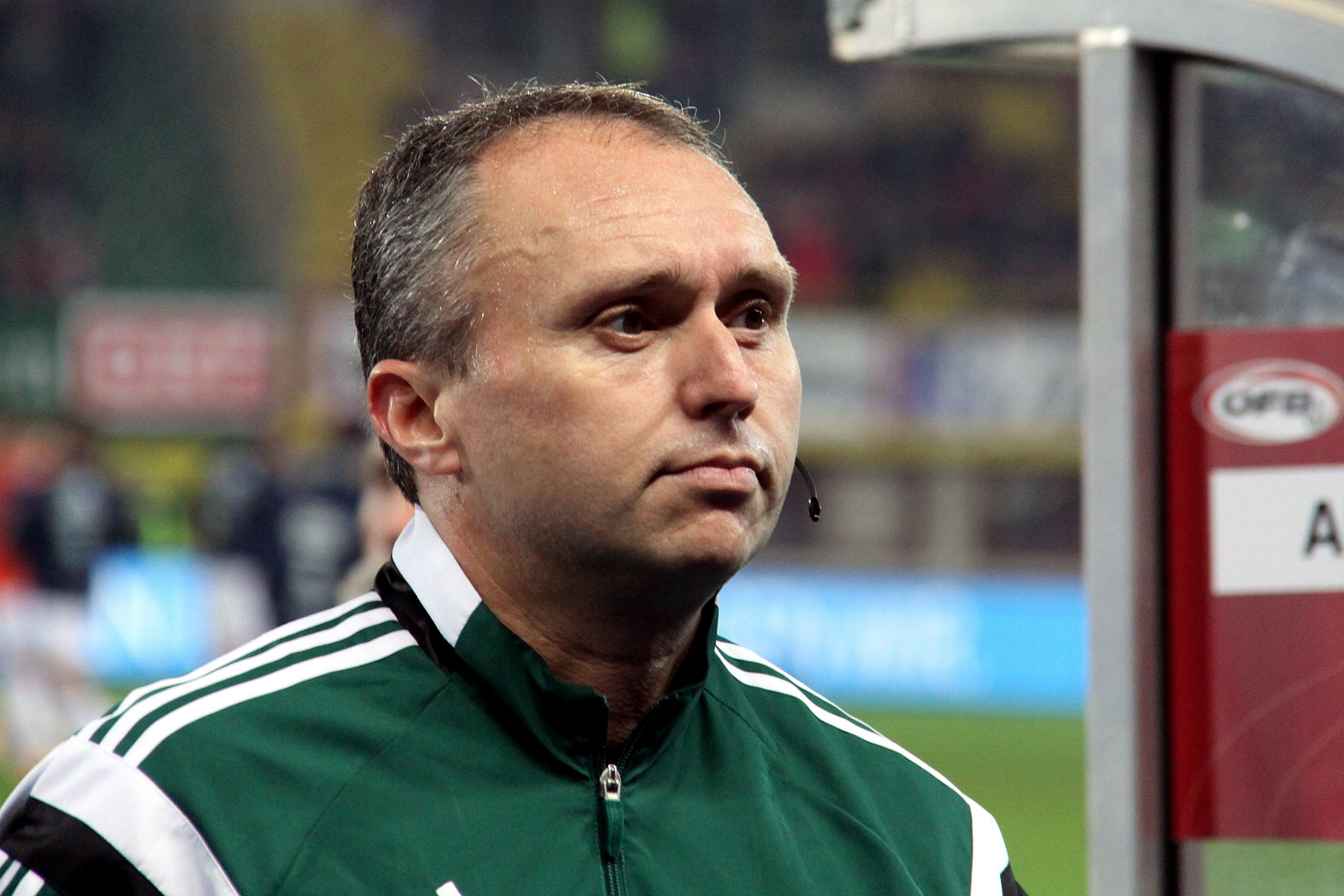
- Cann in 2014
- Born: 22 January 1969 (age 57)

Domestic
Years	League	Role
2005–2025	Premier League	Assistant referee

International
Years	League	Role
2007–2014	FIFA International List	Assistant Referee

Darren Cann (born 22 January 1969) is an English former Premier League and international assistant referee. In 2010, he officiated both The UEFA Champions League Final and The FIFA World Cup Final.

== Football career ==
Before becoming a referee Cann played professional football, firstly playing in the youth team for Norwich City and then being signed by Steve Coppell for Crystal Palace where he played in the same Youth Team as Gareth Southgate and later played up front alongside Ian Wright.

== Refereeing career ==
Cann began refereeing in Norfolk in 1991. He received several promotions working his way up the football pyramid and then began officiating in the Football League as an Assistant Referee in 2001 before being promoted to The Premier League in 2005. In the same year, Cann represented his country for the first time as an International Assistant Referee on a UEFA Cup match between FC Zürich and Legia Warsaw refereed by Howard Webb.

In April 2025, Cann retired from officiating. His final match — Manchester City vs Crystal Palace at the Etihad Stadium — was his 579th Premier League match.

== FA Cup Final ==
At the end of Cann's first season in the Premier League, he was honoured with being appointed to the FA Cup Final. In doing so, Cann became only the third former player to officiate an FA Cup Final. The 2006 FA Cup Final was played between Liverpool and West Ham United. The match finished 3-3 with Liverpool winning 3-1 on penalties and is remembered for Steven Gerrard's last minute equaliser which was voted in a BBC poll as the greatest FA Cup Final goal of the last 50 years.

== UEFA Champions League ==
In December 2006, Cann officiated his first Champions League match. Milan lost 2-0 to Lille at the San Siro, in a match refereed by Graham Poll.

His first knockout stage match came in March 2008, in a round of 16 match between Porto and Schalke at the Estádio do Dragão. This match was overseen by Howard Webb.

Cann oversaw a further 2 knockout stage matches before receiving the appointment to the final—both quarter-finals. The first between Barcelona and Bayern Munich at the Camp Nou in April 2009 and the second between Inter and CSKA Moscow at the San Siro in March 2010.

In May 2010, Cann oversaw the 2-0 final win for Inter over Bayern Munich. The Bernabéu hosted match was refereed by Howard Webb and co-assisted by Michael Mullarkey.

Cann would continue to receive knockout stage appointments, including: a Real Madrid vs Borussia Dortmund semi-final match at the Santiago Bernabéu Stadium in April 2013, an April 2014 quarter-final between Atlético Madrid and Barcelona at the Vicente Calderón Stadium, and a semi-final between Real Madrid and Bayern Munich at the Santiago Bernabéu Stadium, also in April 2014.

In December 2014, Cann would oversee his final Champions League match—a group stage match between Barcelona and Paris St Germain at the Camp Nou. The match was refereed by Martin Atkinson.

== UEFA European Championships ==
In June 2008, Cann alongside referee Howard Webb and assistant referee Michael Mullarkey officiated 2 group matches at Euro 2008, which was co-hosted by Austria and Switzerland. Their first match between Austria and Poland was held at the Ernst-Happel-Stadion in Vienna and ended in a 1-1 draw. Their second match between Greece and Spain took place at the Red Bull Arena in Salzburg, with Spain winning 2-1.

== FIFA World Cup ==
Across June and July 2010, Cann alongside referee Howard Webb and assistant referee Michael Mullarkey, oversaw 4 matches at the World Cup in South Africa. First up, was a group stage match between Spain and Switzerland at the Moses Mabhida Stadium in Durban and followed by another group stage match—this time between Slovakia and Italy at the Ellis Park Stadium in Johannesburg. A few days later, the team was assigned to the round of 16 match between Brazil and Chile, also at the Ellis Park Stadium. The team would subsequently be appointed to the final between the Netherlands and Spain at Soccer City in Johannesburg.

Cann, again alongside Webb and Mullarkey, returned for their second World Cup in 2014. This time, the team would oversee 2 matches at the tournament held in Brazil. To start with, they took charge of Colombia vs Ivory Coast at the Estádio Nacional Mané Garrincha in Brasília and secondly, the team were selected for the round of 16 match between Brazil and Chile at the Estádio Mineirão in Belo Horizonte.

== FIFA Confederations Cup ==
In June 2013, Cann, as before, alongside referee Howard Webb and assistant referee Michael Mullarkey, oversaw 2 matches at the Brazil-held Confederations Cup. Their first assignment was a group stage match between Brazil and Mexico at the Estádio Castelão in Fortaleza, with Brazil winning 2-0. Their second—also at the Estádio Castelão—was a semi-final match between Spain and Italy, which saw Spain advancing to the final against Brazil, after a penalty shoot-out win.

== Personal life ==
Cann lives in Poringland, Norfolk, and has two children.

On 10 February 2021, Cann appeared on the BBC gameshow Pointless. He won the jackpot of £1,500 by identifying a correct, "pointless" answer on the subject of sailing.

== Achievements ==
Sporting positions (England) Darren Cann
Preceded by 2009 UEFA Champions League Final (Switzerland); Matthias Arnet & Francesco Buragina	2010 UEFA Champions League Final Assistant Referee; With: Michael Mullarkey	Succeeded by 2011 UEFA Champions League Final (Hungary); Gábor Erős & György Ring
Preceded by 2006 FIFA World Cup Final (Argentina); Dario García & Rodolfo Otero	2010 FIFA World Cup Final Assistant Referee; With: Michael Mullarkey	Succeeded by 2014 FIFA World Cup Final (Italy); Renato Faverani & Andrea Stefani
