= Richard Turner (footballer, born 1864) =

English footballer

Personal information
- Full name: Richard John Turner
- Date of birth: 20 July 1864
- Place of birth: Kilmarnock, Scotland
- Date of death: 28 March 1944 (aged 79)
- Place of death: Birmingham, England
- Position: Right-back

Senior career*
Years	Team	Apps	(Gls)
1870s	Notts County		
1882–1883	Manchester Association		
1883–1884	Bolton Association		
1884–1886	Blackburn Rovers		
1886–1887	Crusaders		
1887–1891	London Caledonians		
- * Club domestic league appearances and goals

Richard John Turner was a Scottish footballer who won the FA Cup with Blackburn Rovers in 1885 and 1886.

== Personal life ==
Turner was born in Kilmarnock, Ayrshire, on 20 July 1864, one of 10 sons of Frederick and Charlotte (née Escudier) Turner; his father was the agent for John Bentinck, 5th Duke of Portland, and worked on the duke's Scottish estates from 1858 to 1878.

== Football career ==
Turner was a right-back and nicknamed "Iron Turner" for his steely play.

His is noted as having played for Notts County, a club local to the family after it moved to Mansfield Woodhouse in 1878. He moved from there to Manchester Association in October 1882 (where he played as half-back) He put in a "much admired" performance representing the North of England against Bolton Wanderers at the latter's Pike Lane ground in April 1883. This brought him to the attention of the better clubs in Bolton; the media reported that he was to play for Halliwell in 1883–84, but instead he ended up with the new Bolton Association - a staunchly amateur side - for the season.

Turner duly made his FA Cup debut in the first round of the 1883–84 competition for Bolton Association, as full-back in the club's 5–1 win over Bradshaw. He also impressed in the second round defeat against Bolton Wanderers.

At the start of the 1884–85 season, he assisted Blackburn Rovers in a couple of friendlies, and the move was made permanent. He quickly became one of the Rovers' regular full-backs His first competitive match was a fraught 3–2 win over Blackburn Olympic in the second round of the 1884–85 FA Cup, and he also played in the last three rounds, including the final, contributing to Rovers beating Queen's Park to claim the trophy for the second time. Turner also played as right-back for Rovers in its Lancashire Senior Cup final success over Blackburn Olympic the same month.

He played in the Rovers' first two ties in the 1885–86 FA Cup, and was the club's nominated umpire in its fifth round win over Staveley, Hugh McIntyre taking his right-back berth. McIntyre was soon advanced to a half-back position to allow Turner to take his place back at right-back, and he struggled through the final against West Bromwich Albion with an ankle injury, which persuaded the Rovers not to assent to the optional extra-time. He recovered in time for the replay, which Rovers won 2–1.

His final game for Rovers was a disappointment - the club lost its hold on the Lancashire Senior Cup by losing to Bolton Wanderers the week after the final replay. He moved to London soon afterwards, and joined the Crusaders club, which had recently moved to Leyton. However he only played for the club for one season, which included his last FA Cup ties, as he joined the London Caledonians in 1887–88, whom he represented in the London Senior Cup. He represented the Callies on and off the pitch (especially as referee) until 1890–91; his move to Birmingham ended his football career.

== Post-football ==
Turner eloped with Jane Hayton Greenbank in early 1886, and the couple married in Hammersmith on 1 March 1886, one month before the Cup final; they had three daughters and two sons. The couple divorced in 1909.

By 1891, Turner was a solicitor's clerk in Birmingham, and after qualification as a solicitor eventually became a partner in the firm of Beale & Co. in Newhall Street in the city. He was also a councillor on the Solihull Rural Council, and chairman of its urban council successor in 1935–36. He took ill returning from the Liverpool Assizes in January 1944, and was forced to retire; he died two months later.

One of his sons had pre-deceased him, but the other - Frederick Richard Gordon Turner - had been made a vice-admiral in 1942 and was made a Knight Commander of the Bath in 1943, and was Engineer-in-Chief of the Fleet from 1942 to 1945.

== Honours ==
- FA Cup winner: 1885, 1886
- Lancashire Senior Cup winner: 1885
