= James McIntyre (footballer) =

Scottish footballer

James McIntyre (born c.1860 – died 1943) was a Scottish footballer, who played for Rangers and Scotland. He played at half back.

Glasgow born McIntyre, known as 'Tuck', was the younger brother of Hugh, another Scotland international. He began with Glasgow sides St Andrews and Alexandra Athletic before joining Rangers in 1883. He remained with the club for the rest of his playing career, and was in the team which shared the first Scottish Football League championship of 1890–91. After two appearances the following season, however, he did not feature. McIntyre left the club having made 57 league and Scottish Cup appearances in total, scoring twice.
