= David Allan (footballer) =

Scottish footballer

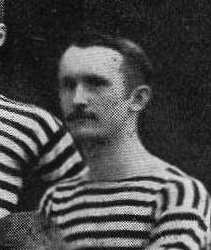

Personal information
- Full name: David Steele Allan
- Date of birth: 30 April 1863
- Place of birth: Irvine, North Ayrshire, Scotland
- Date of death: 26 June 1930 (aged 67)
- Place of death: Glasgow, Scotland
- Positions: Inside left; outside left

Senior career*
Years	Team	Apps	(Gls)
1880–?	Queen's Park		

International career^{‡}
1885–1886	Scotland	3	(2)
- * Club domestic league appearances and goals as of 28 September 2007 ‡ National team caps and goals as of 28 September 2007

David Steele Allan (30 April 1863 – 26 June 1930) was a Scottish footballer who played for Queen's Park and the Scotland national team.

He was born in Irvine, North Ayrshire and learned his football at Ayr Academy and, on moving to Glasgow to begin his career as a stockbroker, he joined Queen's Park in 1880. He won four Scottish Cup medals with the club in 1881, 1884, 1886 and 1890 and played in the club's FA Cup finals of 1884 and 1885. He also played occasionally for London-based club Corinthians.
