= Graham Poll =

English football referee (born 1963)

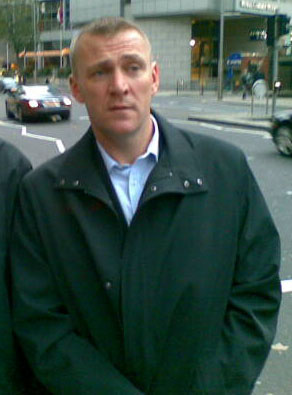
- Full name: Graham Poll
- Born: 29 July 1963 (age 63); Hitchin, Hertfordshire, England
- Other occupation: Television pundit, newspaper columnist

Domestic
Years	League	Role
?–1991	Isthmian League	Referee
1986–1991	Football League	Asst. referee
1991–1993	Football League	Referee
1993–2007	Premier League	Referee

International
Years	League	Role
1996–2007	FIFA listed	Referee

Graham Poll (born 29 July 1963) is an English former football referee in the Premier League. With 26 years of experience, he was one of the most prominent referees in English football, often taking charge of the highest-profile games. His final domestic game in a career spanning 1,544 matches was the Championship play-off final on 28 May 2007 between Derby County and West Bromwich Albion.

He was the English representative at two World Cups and UEFA Euro 2000, and refereed the 2005 UEFA Cup Final.

In his third game of the 2006 FIFA World Cup in Germany, Croatia vs Australia, he cautioned Croatian defender Josip Šimunić three times before sending him off. Poll retired from refereeing international tournament finals matches shortly afterwards, citing his error in the match. He continued to referee in the Premier League, Champions League and on international games, but said he would not allow himself to be nominated to represent the FA at any tournament finals as he felt he had had his chance.

== Football career ==
Poll took up refereeing in 1980, progressing from the Isthmian League to become a Football League assistant referee in 1986. Five years later he became a full Football League referee, before being selected for the list of Premier League referees in 1993. At domestic level, Poll refereed the 1998 Charity Shield between Arsenal and Manchester United, the 2000 FA Cup final between Chelsea and Aston Villa, and the 2002 League Cup final between Blackburn Rovers and Tottenham Hotspur.

Having held a FIFA badge since 1996, he took charge of European matches, including the UEFA Cup final between CSKA Moscow and Sporting Lisbon in 2005. Poll also took charge of international matches, refereeing at FIFA and UEFA tournaments such as Euro 2000, where Poll took charge of France versus Czech Republic, and Norway versus Slovenia in the group stages.

In the dying seconds of the Merseyside derby between Everton and Liverpool on 21 April 2000 with the score at 0–0, the Liverpool goalkeeper kicked the ball into Don Hutchison's back while Hutchison was retreating towards his own half. The ball bounced into Liverpool's net, but Poll disallowed the goal, claiming that he had already blown the whistle to end the game. The television slow-motion pictures proved that this was incorrect, and after retiring in May 2007, Poll confessed that disallowing the goal had been a mistake that he regretted.

Poll refereed the Italy versus Croatia game at the 2002 FIFA World Cup, played on Saturday 8 June 2002, which ended in a 2–1 victory to the former side. Poll had a busy game, as there were forty-two fouls, three goals scored, two Italian goals disallowed, and two bookings. Poll was given one more appointment at that world cup: Fourth Official to Pierluigi Collina in the second round match in which Turkey beat Japan 1–0.

Poll was the only English referee at the 2006 FIFA World Cup in Germany. His first game was South Korea vs Togo. Poll sent off Jean-Paul Abalo of Togo for a second bookable offence, and the match was eventually won by South Korea 2–1. His second game was Saudi Arabia vs Ukraine. Ukraine finished the match as the 4–0 winners, and Poll showed six yellows, three to each side. His last game was Croatia vs Australia. After already sending off two players, Poll failed to send off Josip Šimunić for a second yellow card late in the match, eventually sending him off for a third yellow for dissent at the final whistle. Poll stated that he had erred in his second booking of Šimunić, marking his card with the correct number (3) but in the wrong column due to Šimunić's Australian accent, meaning he booked Australia's Craig Moore instead of Simunic. The game ended 2–2, putting Australia through to the next round. On 28 June, Poll was named as one of 14 officials dismissed by FIFA from the remaining World Cup 2006 matches following his error in the Croatia v. Australia match. Maria Villar Llona, president of the FIFA referee's committee, said of Poll, "He is an exceptional referee and a great sportsman, who will be able to overcome the situation thanks to his strong personality and love of the game."

Poll retired from international tournament finals football on 29 June 2006, citing the error as the reason. He said in his retirement announcement,

What I did was an error in law. There can be no dispute. It was not caused by a FIFA directive, it was not caused by me being asked to referee differently to the way I referee in the Premier League. The laws of the game are very specific. The referee takes responsibility for his actions on the field of play. I was the referee that evening. It was my error and the buck stops with me.

In the press release, he also claimed that he had asked FIFA to be allowed to go home, to be with his family after the trauma of his mistake in the match.

He continued to referee in the Champions League and on international games, but said he would not allow himself to be nominated to represent The FA at any tournament finals. "It's time for somebody else in England to have a go and I will do everything I can to prepare them. But for me tournament football is over," Poll said.

His last match was to have been a Euro 2008 qualifying match on 6 June 2007. After it was discovered he took part in an interview which appeared critical of the support referees receive from the FA in the face of criticism by team managers and coaches the match was overseen by Mike Riley instead. In August 2007, Poll released his autobiography entitled "Seeing Red", and concentrated on being a pundit for BBC Sport's football coverage, and as a columnist with The Daily Mail, his feature entitled "The Official Line".

== International career details ==
1998 FIFA World Cup qualification

- 2 April 1997, Azerbaijan 1–2 Finland

UEFA Euro 2000

- 16 June 2000, Czech Republic 1–2 France
- 21 June 2000, Slovenia 0–0 Norway

2002 FIFA World Cup qualification

- 11 October 2000, Netherlands 0–2 Portugal
- 1 September 2001, Slovenia 2–1 Russia
- 14 November 2001, Paraguay 0–4 Colombia

2002 FIFA World Cup

- 8 June 2002, Italy 1–2 Croatia

2006 FIFA World Cup qualification

- 4 September 2004, Latvia 0–2 Portugal
- 17 August 2005, Latvia 1–1 Russia
- 7 September 2005, Spain 1–1 Serbia and Montenegro
- 12 October 2005, Bahrain 0–0 Uzbekistan
- 16 November 2005, Czech Republic 1–0 Norway

2006 FIFA World Cup

- 13 June 2006, Korea Republic 2–1 Togo
- 19 June 2006, Saudi Arabia 0–4 Ukraine
- 22 June 2006, Croatia 2–2 Australia

== Major matches refereed ==
Date	Match	Tournament	Venue	Result	Ref
18 May 2005	Sporting CP vs. CSKA Moscow	2005 UEFA Cup final	Estádio José Alvalade, Lisbon	1–3	

== Media ==
Poll made several appearances on the football radio show World Soccer Daily, where he was typically asked to provide a view from the point of the referee whenever major controversial issues occur. He also featured weekly on Chappers Premier League Podcast alongside Mark Chapman and Kevin Day. He also featured in the Daily Mail where he spoke on officiating at the highest level, talking about decisions referees have to make. He also appeared regularly as a pundit on Setanta Sports Football Matters show hosted by James Richardson and Rebecca Lowe. Since 2009, Poll has also appeared as a regular news paper reviewer on Sky News Sunrise, and as a writer for DailyMail.com.

== Personal life ==
Born in Hitchin, Poll grew up in Bandley Hill and Shephall, and attended Ashtree Junior School and Alleyne's School. He was married to Julia, until she died in 2023. The couple have two daughters (Gemma and Josie), and one son (Harry). Poll is a QPR Supporter Poll ran in the London Marathon on 13 April 2008, finishing in a time of four hours and 20 minutes. The proceeds went to the Iain Rennie Hospice at Home. Poll walked the SW coastal path in March and April 2025 completing the 630 mile walk in 52 days and raising £15,000 for Breast Cancer Now charity in memory of his late wife Julia.

Preceded by (Italy) Pierluigi Collina	UEFA Cup Final referee 2005	Succeeded by (Germany) Herbert Fandel
Preceded by Peter Jones	FA Charity Shield referee 1998	Succeeded by Graham Barber
Preceded by Peter Jones	FA Cup Final referee 2000	Succeeded by Steve Dunn
Preceded by David Elleray	Football League Cup Final referee 2002	Succeeded by Paul Durkin
