= Fergus Suter =

Scottish stonemason and footballer (1857–1916)

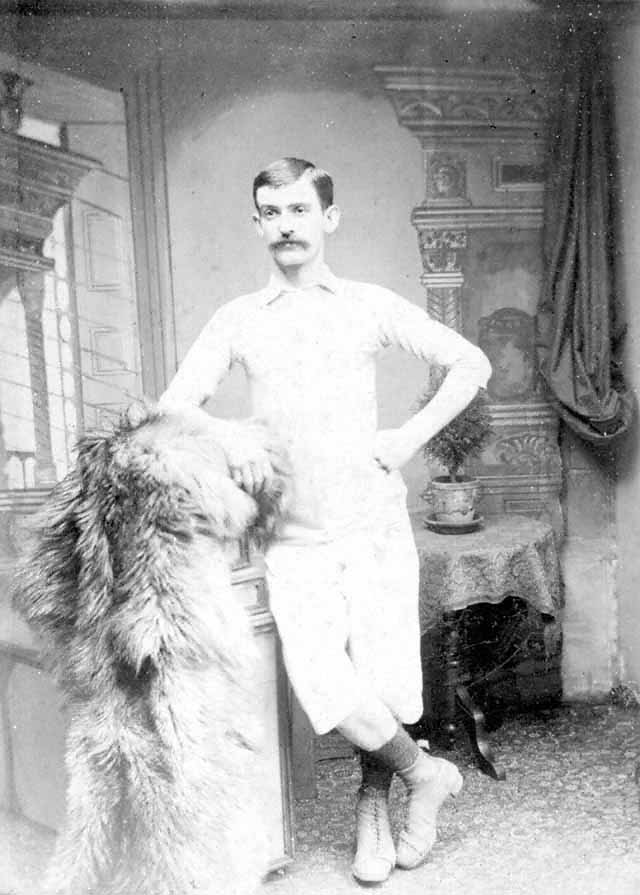

Personal information
- Date of birth: 21 November 1857
- Place of birth: Glasgow, Scotland
- Date of death: 31 July 1916 (aged 58)
- Place of death: Blackpool, England

Senior career*
Years	Team	Apps	(Gls)
1876–1878	Partick		
1878–1880	Darwen		
1880–1889	Blackburn Rovers		
- * Club domestic league appearances and goals

Fergus Suter (21 November 1857 – 31 July 1916) was a Scottish stonemason and footballer in the early days of the game. Arguably the first recognised professional footballer, Suter was a native of Glasgow and played for Partick before moving to England to play for Darwen and Blackburn Rovers.

== Football ==
Suter initially played for Partick (not the same club as the modern Partick Thistle). His first moves below the Scottish border into English football were with Partick. On 1 January 1878, he played for them against Darwen at Barley Bank, and against Blackburn Rovers at Alexandra Meadows the following day. Towards the end of that year, he began to play for the Lancashire club Darwen, following shortly after the arrival of fellow Partick player Jimmy Love.

One source states that Suter left Partick for Rangers in 1877, then coming to England in 1878 and signed for Turton. He left Turton and joined Darwen also in 1878.

Although the game was officially amateur at the time, Suter's move to England to play for Darwen in 1878 was shortly followed by him giving up his job as a stonemason, allegedly claiming that English stone was too difficult to work and fuelling criticism that he was being paid to play.

During the summer of 1880, he caused still more controversy by moving to Blackburn Rovers, a local rival of Darwen. The move again stirred up accusations of professionalism amid claims that Blackburn had offered him improved terms. Suter's move inflamed an already testy local rivalry, and bitter games and crowd trouble dogged Darwen–Blackburn matches for years.

Suter's career was all but over by the time the Football League formed in 1888. He made only one appearance for Blackburn Rovers in that competition, on 22 December 1888 against West Bromwich Albion as a replacement for the goalkeeper Herbie Arthur. He appeared in four FA Cup finals and after Blackburn were runners-up to Old Etonians in 1882, he collected three winner's medals in 1884, 1885, and 1886.

== Personal life ==
Suter was born in Glasgow on 21 November 1857, the son of David Suter and his wife Catherine (née Cook). He married Martha Almond in Blackburn on 22 November 1883. He died of cancer at Branksome, 8 Seafield Road, Blackpool on 31 July 1916. He was survived by his wife, a son Fergus Alexander and a daughter Jessie who later married Frank Cumberbirch. In later life Suter ran the Millstone Hotel in Darwen.

== Portrayals ==
Suter is one of the main characters in the Netflix mini-series The English Game (2020), played by Kevin Guthrie. The series depicts him leaving Darwen to join an unspecified Blackburn-based club and winning the FA Cup in the same season with victory over the Old Etonians. Blackburn Olympic did indeed defeat the Etonians to become the first working-class team to lift the cup, but this was not the club which Suter joined and the win did not come until 1883, three years after Suter left Darwen. Suter in fact joined Olympic's local rivals Blackburn Rovers in 1880 and was in the team which lost in the 1882 Cup Final against the Old Etonians. He would later go on to star in three consecutive Cup Final victories in 1884, 1885, and 1886.

Having watched the Netflix series, viewer Jacqueline McAleese noticed that Suter's grave in Blackburn Old Cemetery had become dilapidated with the gravestone fallen and the plot just a mound of grass. After she contacted Blackburn Rovers they funded a restoration of his grave which was completed in 2021.

== Honours ==
Blackburn Rovers

- FA Cup : 1884, 1885, 1886
