= Walter Arnott =

Scottish sportsman

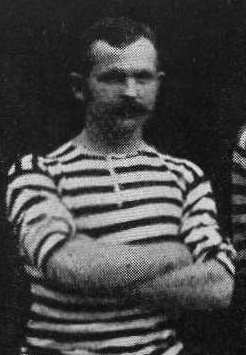

Personal information
- Full name: Walter Arnott
- Date of birth: 12 May 1861
- Place of birth: Govan, Scotland
- Date of death: 18 May 1931 (aged 70)
- Place of death: Clarkston, Scotland
- Position: Right back

Senior career*
Years	Team	Apps	(Gls)
- Matilda
- Pollokshields Athletic
–1882	Ashfield		
1882–1893	Queen's Park	0	(0)
- → Pollokshields Athletic (guest)
1884	→ Kilmarnock (guest)		
- → Newcastle West End (guest)
- → Corinthian (guest)
- → Ballina (guest)
1892	→ Third Lanark (guest)	1	(0)
1893–1894	St Bernard's	15	(1)
1895	Notts County	1	(0)
- Corinthian

International career
1883–1893	Scotland	14	(0)

Managerial career
- Queen's Park (youth)
- * Club domestic league appearances and goals

Walter Arnott (12 May 1861 – 18 May 1931), sometimes known as Wattie Arnott, was a Scottish footballer who played for Queen's Park and the Scotland national team.

== Football career ==
Born in Pollokshields (then in Renfrew County but in the parish of Govan), Arnott joined Queen's Park from Pollokshields Athletic in 1882 as a replacement for Andrew Watson and remained with the Glasgow club until 1893. However, as an amateur he was free to play for other clubs, including Kilmarnock, Newcastle West End, Notts County, Third Lanark and Corinthian. He also coached the young players at Queen's Park, initially retiring from playing in 1888 before being persuaded to return.

At Queen's Park, he won the Scottish Cup three times in 1884, 1886 and 1890, gaining additional medals in the Glasgow Cup and Glasgow Merchants Charity Cup, typically partnered by Andrew Holm and later by Bob Smellie. He also won FA Cup runners-up medals in 1884 and 1885. He switched to St Bernard's on a permanent basis (making all but one of his Scottish Football League appearances with the Edinburgh club) following a dispute with Queen's Park regarding being overlooked for the later stages of the 1892–93 Scottish Cup, but did not play for Belfast side Linfield as reported in some sources – this player, who won an Irish Cup medal, was Willie Arnott, brother of Wattie.

Arnott was capped 14 times by Scotland between 1883 and 1893. He appeared in ten consecutive matches against England, a Scottish record, although it has been noted that the results of those matches were not always in Scotland's favour, with the style of play used by Queen's Park differing from that used by the likes of Renton and Celtic, and some defensive partnerships from the different 'schools' being ineffective. The SFA honoured Arnott by presenting him with a special International Cap to commemorate his achievement – this is now displayed at the Scottish Football Museum.

== Other sports ==
Arnott was also a noted bowls, cricket, and tennis player. He was also an avid yachtsman. He was also Secretary of the Crossmyloof Curling Club from 1912 to 1931.

== See also ==
- List of Scotland national football team captains
