= Robert Christie (footballer) =

Scottish footballer and curler

Personal information
- Full name: Robert Main Christie
- Date of birth: 15 November 1865
- Place of birth: Dunblane, Scotland
- Date of death: 15 May 1918 (aged 52)
- Place of death: Rouen, France
- Positions: Outside forward; left half

Senior career*
Years	Team	Apps	(Gls)
- Dunblane
- Edinburgh University
1883–1888	Queen's Park	0	(0)
–1889	Dunblane		

International career
1884	Scotland	1	(0)
- * Club domestic league appearances and goals

Robert Main Christie (15 November 1865 – 15 May 1918) was a Scottish amateur footballer who played as an outside forward, most notably for Queen's Park. He later became president of the SFA and represented Scotland at curling.

== Club career ==
An outside forward and left half, Christie began his career with Dunblane and Edinburgh University and won the 1882–83 East of Scotland Shield with the latter club. He joined Queen's Park in September 1883 and in a short, but eventful career with the Spiders, he scored in the 1884 FA Cup Final (becoming the only Scot to score for a Scottish club in an FA Cup Final and until Norman Whiteside 99 years later, the youngest goalscorer in an FA Cup Final) and won the 1885–86 Scottish Cup and two Glasgow Merchants Charity Cups. A serious knee injury forced Christie into an early retirement at age 21 and after a one-off comeback appearance in October 1888, he finished his Queen's Park career with 28 appearances and 15 goals. He made a short comeback with Dunblane and ended his career by helping the club to win the 1888–89 Perthshire Cup.

== International career ==
Christie won one cap for Scotland, in a 1–0 win over England on 15 March 1884.

== Administrative career ==
At the age of 21, Christie was elected to represent Perthshire at the SFA and after his retirement from football, Christie remained with Dunblane as the club's secretary. He became president of the SFA in 1903. Christie also administered Dunblane's first golf club.

== Personal life ==
Christie was married with five children. His younger brother Alex would also become an international footballer and until 2014, his great grandson Ranald Gilbert was general manager of Ross County. Christie attended Edinburgh University and after his retirement from football, he became a civil engineer and architect in Dunblane. Christie served as a captain in the Black Watch during the Second Boer War and enlisted in the Highland Light Infantry after the outbreak of the First World War in 1914. He was later attached to the Royal Scots Fusiliers and saw action on the Western Front and in Salonika. Christie was seconded to the Labour Corps and was an acting lieutenant colonel when his company was shelled with mustard gas while cable-laying near Foncquevillers, France, on 11 May 1918. He lived on for four days before dying in a Red Cross hospital in Rouen. Christie was buried in Rouen's St. Sever Cemetery.

== Career statistics ==
Appearances and goals by club, season and competition
Club	Season	Scottish Cup		FA Cup		Other		Total	
Club	Season	Apps	Goals	Apps	Goals	Apps	Goals	Apps	Goals
Queen's Park	1883–84	6	3	7	4	2 (Note: Appearances in Glasgow Merchants Charity Cup)	1	15	8
Queen's Park	1884–85	1	0	4	4	1	0	6	4
Queen's Park	1885–86	6	3	0	0	0	0	6	3
Queen's Park	1888–89	1	0	—		0	0	1	0
Career total		14	6	11	8	3	1	28	15

== Honours ==
Queen's Park

- Scottish Cup: 1885–86
- Glasgow Merchants Charity Cup: 1883–84, 1884–85

Edinburgh University

- East of Scotland Shield: 1882–83

Dunblane

- Perthshire Cup: 1888–89
