= John Gow (footballer, born 1859) =

Scottish footballer

Personal information
- Full name: John James Gow
- Date of birth: 4 October 1859
- Place of birth: Glasgow, Scotland
- Position: Defender

Senior career*
Years	Team	Apps	(Gls)
1880–1887	Queen's Park		

International career
1885	Scotland	1	(0)
- * Club domestic league appearances and goals

John James Gow (born 4 October 1859) was a Scottish footballer who played as a defender.

== Career ==
Born in Glasgow, Gow played club football for Queen's Park, and made one appearance for Scotland in 1885.
