= John Inglis (footballer, born 1859) =

Scottish footballer

Personal information
- Full name: John Inglis
- Date of birth: 17 June 1859
- Place of birth: Kilwinning, Scotland
- Date of death: 16 August 1920 (aged 61)
- Place of death: Preston, England
- Position: Forward

Senior career*
| Years | Team | Apps | (Gls) |
- Partick
| 1880–1884 | Rangers | | |
| 1884 | Blackburn Rovers | | |
| 1884–1887 | Great Lever | | |
| 1888–1890 | Preston North End | | |

International career
| 1883 | Scotland | 2 | (0) |
- * Club domestic league appearances and goals

John Inglis (17 June 1859 – 16 August 1920) was a Scottish footballer who played as a forward.

== Career ==
Inglis played club football for Partick and Rangers in Scotland, and for Blackburn Rovers (winning the FA Cup in 1884 during a spell of only a few months at the club), Great Lever and Preston North End in England (also making guest appearances for Blackburn Olympic and Preston Swifts).

He made two appearances for Scotland in 1883 while with Rangers.
