= George Gillespie (footballer) =

Scottish footballer

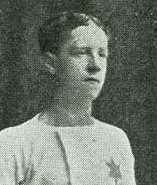
Gillespie as a Rangers player in 1877

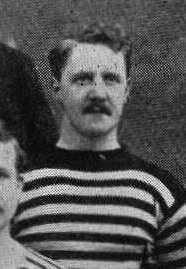
Gillespie in Queen's Park kit, 1890

George Gillespie (22 June 1859 – 3 February 1900) was a Scottish footballer who played for Rangers (1876–1883), Queen's Park (1884–1892) and Scotland in the late 19th century.

== Career ==
He played as a goalkeeper, but initially was a defender, featuring in the 1877 Scottish Cup Final for Rangers in that role but taking up the specialist position by the time the club appeared in the showpiece fixture again two years later. Gillespie was on the losing side in both those finals, and also in the English FA Cup Finals of 1884 and 1885 with Queen's Park, but he did win the Scottish Cup with the Spiders in 1886 and 1890. He also played once for the English amateur side Corinthian.

Gillespie made his debut for Scotland on 27 March 1880 against Wales, a 5–1 victory at Hampden Park. He earned his seventh and last cap on 28 March 1891 against Ireland, serving as captain in a 2–1 victory at the first Celtic Park.

== See also ==
- List of Scotland national football team captains
