= Charles Clegg (footballer) =

English footballer and FA official (1850–1937)

Sir Charles Clegg JP
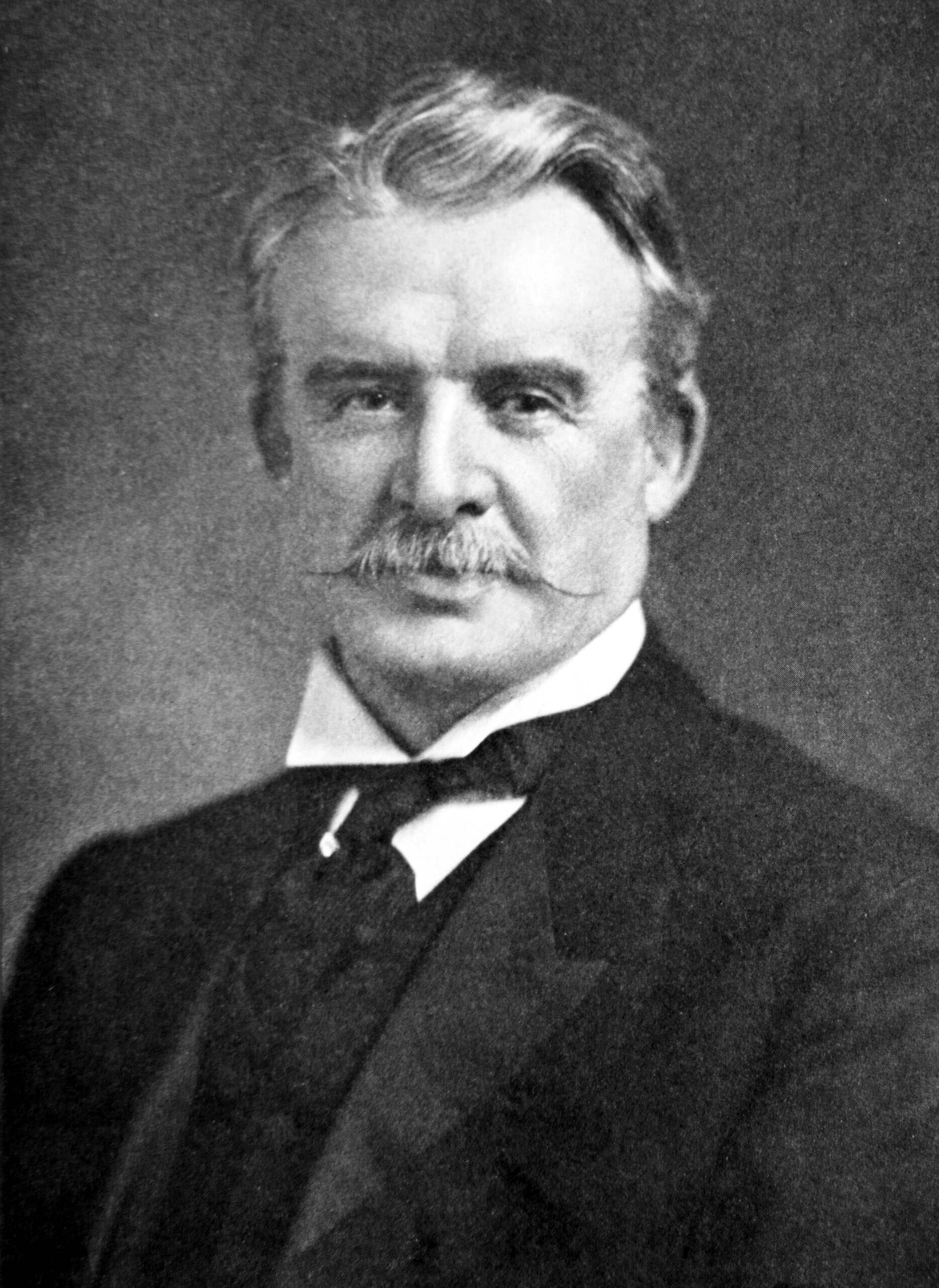
- Born: John Charles Clegg; 15 June 1850; Sheffield
- Died: 26 June 1937 (aged 87)
- Occupations: Football player Football executive
- Known for: Founder of Sheffield United; President of The FA (1923–37)

Sir John Charles Clegg (15 June 1850 – 26 June 1937) was an English footballer and later both chairman and president of The Football Association. He was born in Sheffield and lived there his whole life. He competed in the first international match between England and Scotland in 1872. He was the older brother of William Clegg, whom he played both with and against.

He became heavily involved in local football serving as chairman and president of Sheffield Wednesday and one of the founders of Sheffield United. He played a critical role in merging the two competing Sheffield football associations into the Sheffield and Hallamshire Football Association, of which he then became chairman. During his reign in charge of the FA he became known as the Napoleon of Football.

== Early life and playing career ==
Charles Clegg was the son of Mary and William Johnson Clegg, who went on to have a total of six children. His father was a trainee solicitor at the time of Charles' birth. Two years later he became a highway rate collector but re-entered the profession after the Great Sheffield Flood in 1864. He prepared claims against the water company responsible. This led to him to become a fully qualified solicitor and found his own firm, which became known as Clegg & Sons. He also went on to be mayor of Sheffield three times.

Charles joined his father's law firm after leaving school and eventually became a solicitor in 1872. In the same year, he married Mary Sykes, with whom he had three children. Both Charles and his brother were noted athletes with a flair for football. Charles was also an outstanding runner winning prizes at the 100 yards sprint and the quarter-mile. Locally he played for Sheffield F.C., Perseverance and Broomhill but his favoured club became Sheffield Wednesday.

He and his brother represented the Sheffield Association in the first inter-association match against the FA at Bramall Lane on 2 December 1871. The game was won 3–1 by Sheffield, and Clegg became a regular feature in inter-association matches.

The highlight of his career came when he represented England in the first international played on 30 November 1872. However, he did not enjoy the experience later stating that his teammates were 'snobs from the south who had no use for a lawyer from Sheffield'. This proved to be the only cap that he earned. He and William went on to become the first brothers to win English caps when his brother earned his first cap the next year.

In the Football Annual of 1875 by Charles W. Alcock, he was described as "very fast with the ball, passing it with great judgment and, when within sight of the enemy's goal-posts, an unerring kick."

Towards the end of his career he earned one last distinction. When it was decided to experiment with the first floodlit match he and his brother were chosen to captain the two sides involved. On the night of 15 October 1878 a crowd of 20,000 turned up at Bramall Lane to see the Reds (captained by Clegg) beaten by the Blues 2–0. The game was declared a huge success.

== Rise to the top ==
After finishing his playing career Clegg became a referee. During the 80s it was said that there were few major Sheffield matches that were not refereed by either him or his brother (William Clegg). He also was put in charge of two FA Cup finals, in 1882 and 1892 as well as the 1888 match between Scotland and Wales and the 1893 match between England and Scotland.

He also became prevalent in local football politics. In the mid-1880s he became the Chairman of Sheffield Wednesday. He also became chairman of Sheffield Football Association in 1885 earning a place on the FA Council. He subsequently played a crucial role in uniting the Sheffield and Hallamshire associations.

In 1889, in his role as president of Sheffield United Cricket Club, he proposed that a football club should be based at Bramall Lane. It was named after the cricket club and so Sheffield United Football Club was born on 22 March 1889. He also became the president and chairman of the new club.

== The Napoleon of Football ==
Clegg became vice president and chairman of the Football Association in 1889 and 1890, respectively. It was a turbulent time in English football. Professionalism, something that Clegg vehemently opposed throughout his life, had been legalised in 1885 and the Football League had been created the season before.

During his years in charge, Clegg oversaw the Football Association's entry into FIFA in 1905 and subsequent exit in 1919. After re-entering in the early 1920s they left FIFA once again in 1927 over the thorny issue of professional payments.

He also became President of the FA in 1923 after the death of Lord Kinnaird. No other person before or since has held both positions. He was knighted by King George V in the 1927 Birthday Honours for services to the Board of Trade and Ministry of Labour. Although the citation did not mention football, he is generally regarded as the first person to receive a knighthood for services to football.

Clegg died on 26 June 1937, barely two months after seeing his beloved Wednesday fall into the second division. His funeral was held at Sheffield Cathedral on 30 June and was attended by representatives from both national FAs and all the county FAs of England as well as a number of clubs. He was buried at Fulwood Churchyard in Sheffield.

== Personality ==
Clegg was a strict teetotaller and non-smoker. He also had a deep religious conviction. His favourite quote was "nobody ever gets lost on a straight road". He was known to frown on those who drank before matches and also disliked gambling. He feared that professionalism would be a corrupting influence on the game and fought a losing battle against it throughout his administrative career.

Despite this he was more broad-minded than people expected. He understood that players sometimes had to 'rough it'. He also had a sharp wit. During a disciplinary meeting, where a young player had been brought before him for ungentlemanly remarks to a referee, Clegg asked what had been said. The player responded, "Well, I said 'I've shit better referees'". "I see," said Clegg. "All right, I'll tell you what I'll do. I'll give you a week to prove you can do just that. But if you can't, I'm afraid you'll have to pay a £1 fine".
