= Francis Marindin =

British Army officer & footballer (1838-1900)

Francis Arthur Marindin
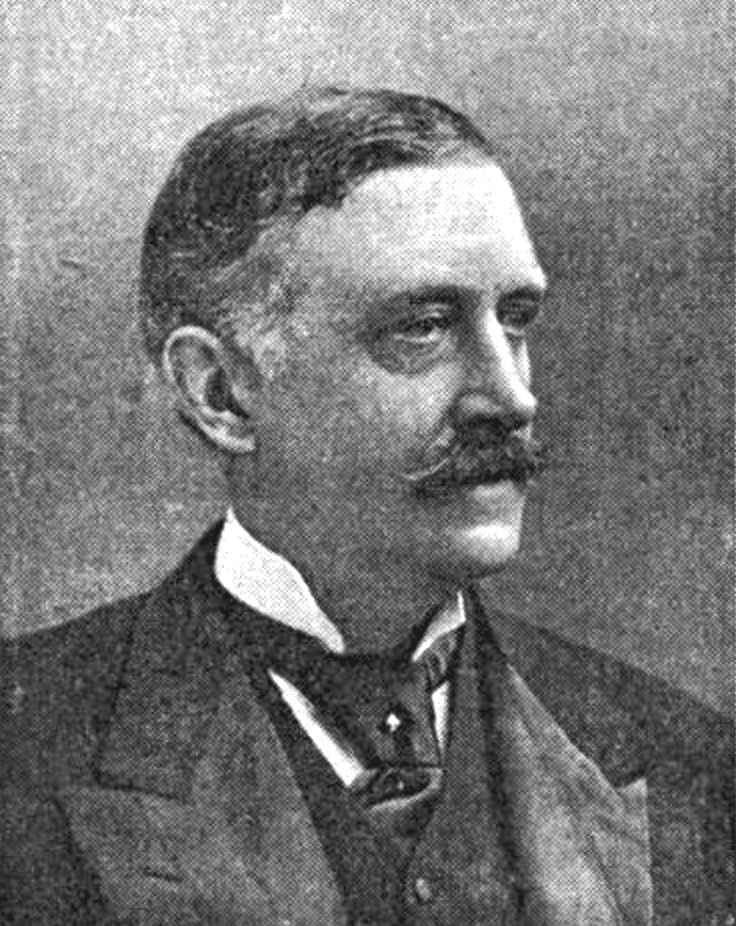
- Marindin c. 1892
- Born: 1 May 1838; Weymouth, Dorset, England
- Died: 21 April 1900 (aged 61); Hans Crescent, London, England
- Education: Eton College; Royal Military Academy, Woolwich
- Occupations: Football player Football executive Soldier; Inspecting officer of railways
- Known for: Founder and player of Royal Engineers AFC; President of The FA (1874–90)
- Father: Rev. Samuel Marindin
- Military career
- Branch: (United Kingdom) British Army
- Service years: 1854–1879
- Rank: Colonel
- Unit: Royal Engineers
- Conflicts: Crimean War
Association football career
Senior career*
Years	Team	Apps	(Gls)
1869–1872	Royal Engineers		
- * Club domestic league appearances and goals

Colonel Sir Francis Arthur Marindin, KCMG (1 May 1838 – 21 April 1900) served with the Royal Engineers and was a key figure in the early development of association football. He was later knighted for his work in public services.

== Early life and education ==
Born in Weymouth, Dorset, he was the second son of the Rev. Samuel Marindin of Chesterton, in the parish of Worfield, Shropshire. He was educated at Eton College and the Royal Military Academy, Woolwich.

== Military career ==
Marindin joined the Royal Engineers as an Ensign on 28 December 1854 and saw active service in the Crimean War (1855–56). He was a member of the Board of Trade Railway Inspectorate, an occupation he continued after he left the Corps. He was ultimately an honorary colonel in the Engineer and Railway Staff Corps.

== Football career ==
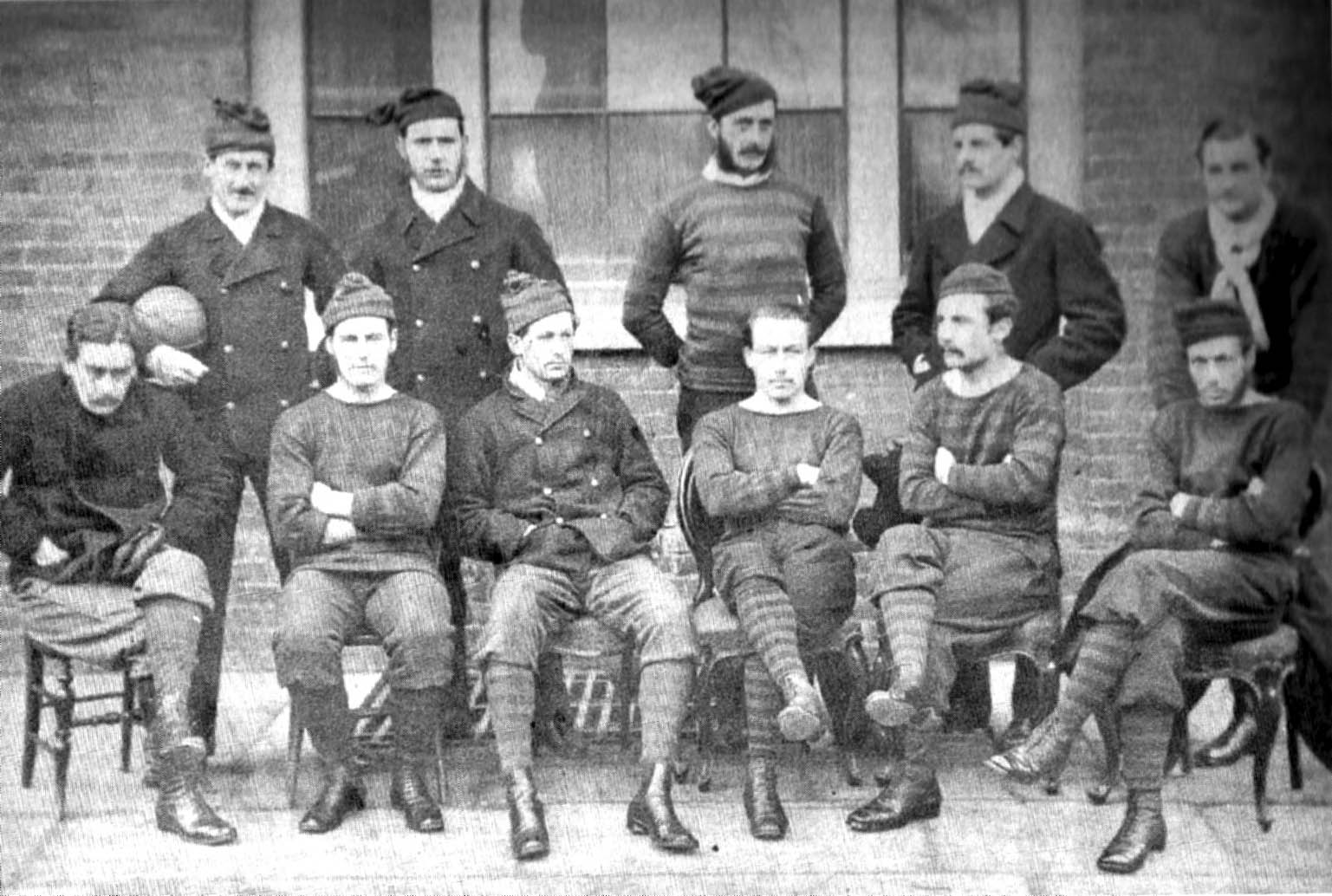
Marindin (upper, third from left) pictured during his time with the Royal Engineers team in 1872

He is credited with having founded the Royal Engineers Football team in 1869, which went on to win the FA Cup in 1875. The club had been founded in at least 1863 and is notable as the first side to exploit modern teamwork and passing tactics. He retired from the Royal Engineers in 1879 at the rank of Major.

As a football player, Marindin played in the first FA Cup final in 1872, which the Royal Engineers' team lost to Wanderers. At the time, Marindin held the rank of Captain. The team lost the final again in 1874 to Oxford University, with Marindin in the XI, but won it against the Old Etonians in 1875, although Marindin was absent, having left Chatham for a new posting. The legend that he came to the match but abstained from playing over a conflict of interest as both an Engineer and an Old Etonian is unfounded.

Marindin become the President of the Football Association in 1874 and served in that capacity until 1890. As a referee he took charge of the 1880 FA Cup final and seven in succession from 1884 to 1890. This period included a replay at Derbyshire County Cricket Club's Racecourse Ground in 1886, the first time an FA Cup final had been played outside London. In his last final, crowds invaded the pitch and soldiers had to clear the field. He was considered "one of the outstanding referees who really knows the rules". He was widely known simply as "The Major".

Marindin served as an arbitrator (along with Lord Kingsburgh) in settling the dispute among the four home rugby unions which resulted in the creation of the International Rugby Football Board in 1890.

== Later career ==
He became an Inspecting Officer for the Board of Trade in 1875, rising to Senior Inspector of Railways in 1895. His work in this regard involved travelling the country to test and inspect new works on passenger railways to ensure their safety before they could be used, and also compiling reports on railway accidents. In these respects, he investigated the Tay Bridge disaster and the accident at Thirsk in 1892. In describing this period of his life, his obituary in The Times of 24 April 1900, described him as "plain speaking, coupled with a complete mastery of his subject", making the point that the railway companies of the time knew that his office "was not likely to allow irregularities to remain long unnoticed". In 1899 he submitted a report on accidents involving railway workers which was part of the impetus for a new act of Parliament, and throughout the 1890s was responsible for a host of improvements in the working practices of Britain's railways.

He helped develop London's new electrical lighting system and was knighted in 1897. He died aged 61 on 21 April 1900 at home at Hans Crescent, London S.W., and was buried on the family Scottish property at Craigflower, Torryburn, Dunfermline.

== In popular culture ==
Marindin is portrayed by Daniel Ings in the Netflix series The English Game.
