= Jimmy Brown (footballer, born 1862) =

English footballer

James Brown
Personal information
- Date of birth: 31 July 1862
- Place of birth: Blackburn, England
- Date of death: 4 July 1922 (aged 59)
- Position: Forward

Senior career*
Years	Team	Apps	(Gls)
1881–1889	Blackburn Rovers	4	(0)

International career
1881–1885	England	5	(3)
- * Club domestic league appearances and goals

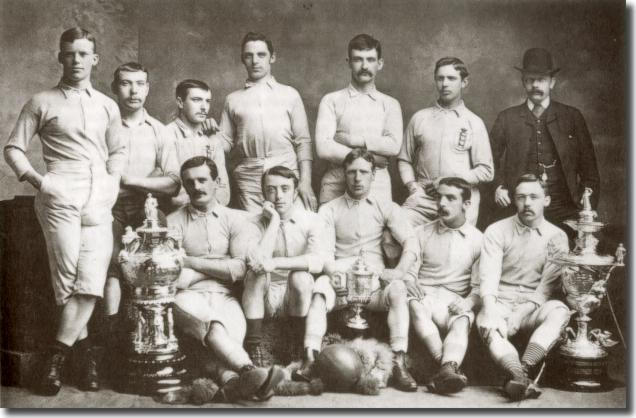
The Blackburn Rovers team which won the FA Cup in 1884. Brown (front row, centre) holds the trophy.

James Brown (31 July 1862 – 4 July 1922) was an English footballer of the Victorian era.

== Playing career ==
Born in Blackburn, he played for Blackburn Rovers and was part of the team that won the FA Cup in three successive seasons between 1884 and 1886 (captaining the side in 1885 and 1886), as well as appearing on the side which lost in 1882. He scored goals in both the 1885 and 1886 cup finals. Brown had a break from football from 1886 to 1888 but returned to Rovers to play in the inaugural Football League season of 1888–1889. Brown made his League debut at outside-left on 17 November 1888 at Leamington Road, Blackburn as Rovers took on top team rivals Aston Villa. Rovers were superb and won 5–1. However, those Rovers fans who thought that Brown would re-produce his dribbling skills, delicate touch, devastating pace and eye for goal were unduly optimistic. Brown played only 3 more matches after his debut from 1 December 1888 until 29 December 1888. He played once at centre-forward and twice at inside left. Brown retired from football in 1889 having played a small part in assisting Rovers to finish 4th in the League.

== International career ==
Brown was capped on five occasions by the England national team. His debut was against Wales on 26 February 1881. He was 18 years and 210 days old making him the 10th youngest player for England of all time. He scored his first goal against Ireland on 18 February 1882. His last cap was versus Scotland on 21 March 1885. He scored three goals in total for England.
