= Nat Walton =

English footballer

Personal information
- Full name: Nathaniel Walton
- Date of birth: 28 May 1867
- Place of birth: Preston, England
- Date of death: 3 March 1930 (aged 62)
- Place of death: Blackburn, England
- Height: 5 ft 8 in (1.73 m)
- Position: Inside forward

Senior career*
| Years | Team | Apps | (Gls) |
| 1883–1884 | Witton | | |
| 1884–1893 | Blackburn Rovers | 110 | (37) |
| 1893–1894 | Nelson | | |

International career
| 1890 | England | 1 | (0) |
- * Club domestic league appearances and goals

Nathaniel Walton (28 May 1867 – 3 March 1930) was an English international footballer, who played as an inside forward.

== Career ==
Born in Preston, Walton played professionally for Blackburn Rovers, and earned one cap for England in 1890.

Like so many other players of his era, Walton graduated through local football (signed for Witton in 1883) to join the ranks (1884) of Blackburn Rovers at a time when the club was becoming the dominant force in the town. He was an industrious inside-forward who earned himself a regular place in the endless round of friendly fixtures during the 1884–1885 season. Unfortunately, he looked destined to continually miss out on the big occasions when he was overlooked for the FA Cup Finals of 1885 and 1886. He did play in the replayed final of 1886 against West Bromwich Albion and Walton helped his team to win 2–0.

Walton, playing as a forward, made his League debut at Leamington Road, then home of Blackburn Rovers, on 15 September 1888 in a match against Accrington. The match was drawn 5–5. He scored his debut League goal on 22 September 1888 in a match played at Leamington Road, against West Bromwich Albion. Blackburn Rovers won 6-2 and Walton scored two of the six. Walton played in the two FA Cup semi-final matches against Wolverhampton Wanderers (the first match ended 1-1). Blackburn Rovers lost the replay 3–1. In season 1888–89 Nat Walton played 20 League matches and scored ten League goals. As a forward he played in a forward-line that scored three-League-goals-or-more-in-a-match on ten separate occasions. In scoring 10 League goals Walton scored two-in-a-match twice. Nat Walton played in all five of Blackburn Rovers FA Cup ties. He scored once, in a First Round Replay played on 9 February 1889 at Leamington Road, against Accrington. Blackburn won 5–0.

One source described Nat Walton thus, "Walton is always good, though, perhaps, rarely brilliant".
