= Herbie Arthur =

English footballer

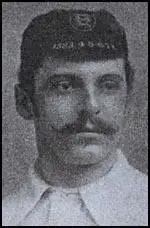

Personal information
- Full name: William John Herbert Arthur
- Date of birth: 14 February 1863
- Place of birth: Blackburn, England
- Date of death: 27 November 1930 (aged 67)
- Place of death: Blackburn, England
- Position: Goalkeeper

Senior career*
Years	Team	Apps	(Gls)
- Lower Bank Academy
- King's Own
1880–1890	Blackburn Rovers	19	(0)
1890–1891	Southport Central	13	(0)
1891–1892	Blackburn Rovers	21	(0)
Total		53	(0)

International career
1885–1887	England	7	(0)
- * Club domestic league appearances and goals

William John Herbert Arthur (14 February 1863 – 27 November 1930) was an English footballer who played as a goalkeeper for Blackburn Rovers and the England national side.

== Early and personal life ==
Arthur was born on 14 February 1863 in Blackburn, Lancashire, the eldest of three sons. By 1881 he was assisting his father's business as a leather dealer. He married in 1891, and had two children, a daughter and a son.

== Club career ==
Arthur began his career with local clubs Lower Bank Academy and King's Own, before joining Blackburn Rovers during 1880-81 season. He was initially a right half, before becoming goalkeeper for the reserve team. In 1884 a correspondent of the Blackburn Times wrote the following about Arthur: "As a goalkeeper does not rank as a brilliant or tricky player, but he has the better quality of being safe, and whether engaged in important or small matches is invariably on the alert to prevent the scoring of any point against his side. That so few goals have been recorded against him in matches with powerful teams speaks well for his reliability". Another reference confirms that Arthur was more about position rather than panache.

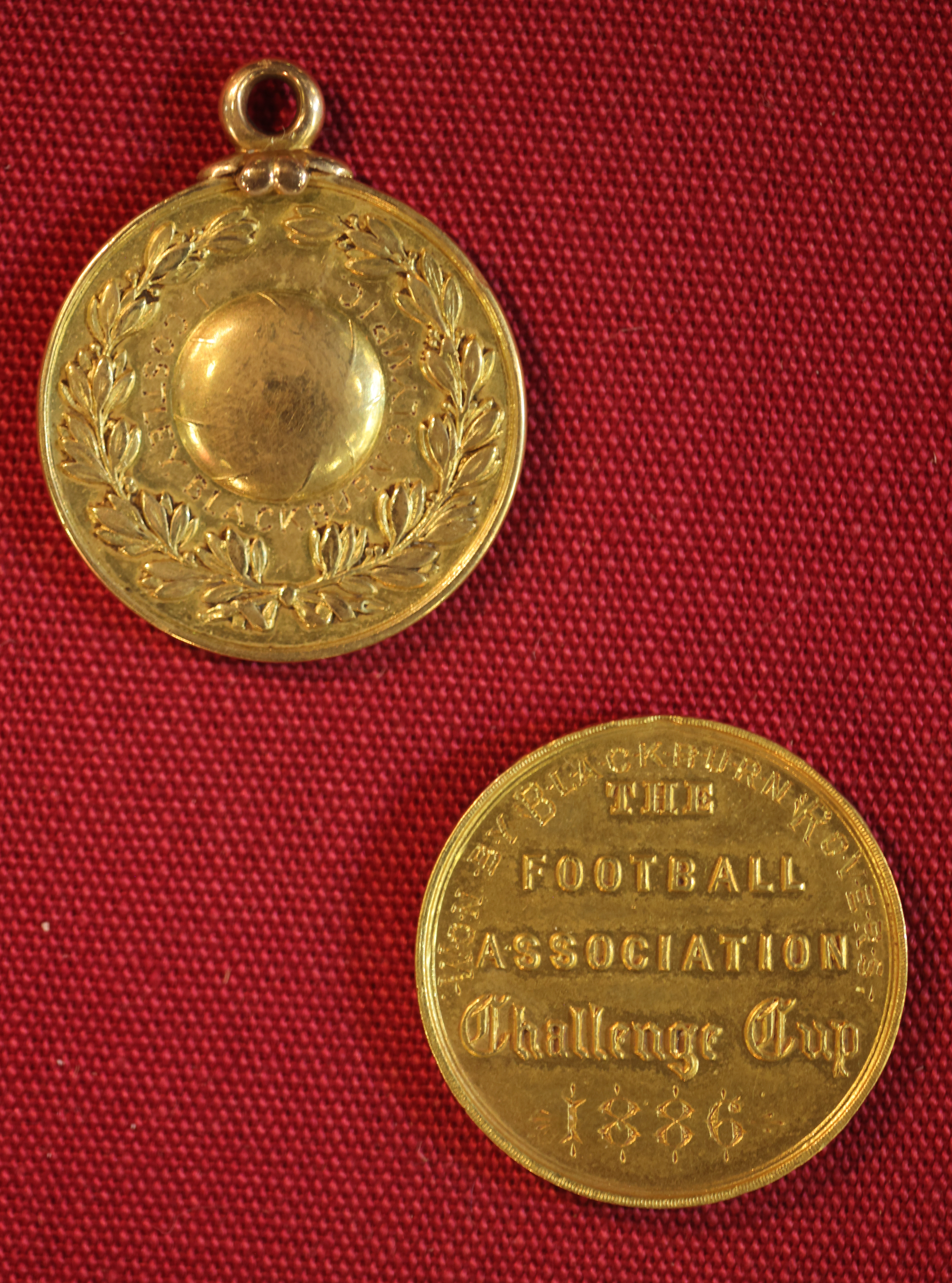
Herbie Arthur's 1886 FA cup winner's medal

He spent the 1890–91 season with Southport Central, before re-joining Rovers. With Southport he made 16 appearances in all competitions, 13 in the league and 3 in the Lancashire Junior Cup.

Arthur was famously involved in anincident during the First Division match against Burnley in December 1891, at Turf Moor. Played in poor weather, at half-time Burnley were leading 3–0. After the ten-minute interval, the Burnley players returned to the pitch, but there was no sign of the Rovers players. Referee Charles Clegg waited four minutes, and then started the second half, even though not all Rovers players were on the pitch. After two players were sent off early in the half, all of the Rovers players, except Arthur, left the field. The referee did not stop the game, thus making Arthur play on his own against the eleven Burnley players. Arthur quickly realised that all of the Burnley players were automatically offside, as there were never two Rovers players between them and the Rovers goal. He appealed to referee Clegg, who abandoned the game, realising the farcical situation that the game had become.

He left the club at the end of the 1891–92 season, having made a total of 40 league appearances for Rovers. With Blackburn he won the FA Cup on four occasions, in 1883–84, 1884–85, 1885–86, and 1889–90.

== International career ==
He earned 7 caps for England between 1885 and 1887.

== Later life and death ==
By 1901 he had taken over his father's business. He later worked as a mill furnisher, had business interests in Manchester, and was an official of the Lancashire Automobile Club and the Manchester and North of England Orchid Society, and was a committee member for the 1927 Blackpool Flower Show.

He died on 27 November 1930 at a nursing home in Blackpool, aged 67.
