= Hugh McIntyre (footballer) =

Scottish footballer

Hugh McIntyre (27 June 1855 – June 1905) was a Scottish footballer who played for Rangers, Blackburn Rovers and Scotland.

Glasgow born McIntyre was the older brother of James, another Scotland international. A versatile player, McIntyre usually played in defence but was also known to lead the attack or even play in goal. He began with Glasgow Northern, then joined the new Partick Thistle club before moving to Rangers in 1878. He played in the 1879 Scottish Cup Final, which Rangers drew before refusing a replay against Vale of Leven. McIntyre made 13 Scottish Cup appearances for Rangers in total. A year later, he moved south to Blackburn Rovers.
