= 1888–89 Blackburn Rovers F.C. season =

Blackburn Rovers
1888–89 season
- Football League: 4th (26 Points)
- FA Cup: Semi final
- Top goalscorer: Jack Southworth (21)
Home colours

The 1888–89 season was Blackburn Rovers's first season in the Football League which had just been founded. Because of this they became one of the founder members of the Football League. They finished in 4th position with 26 points.

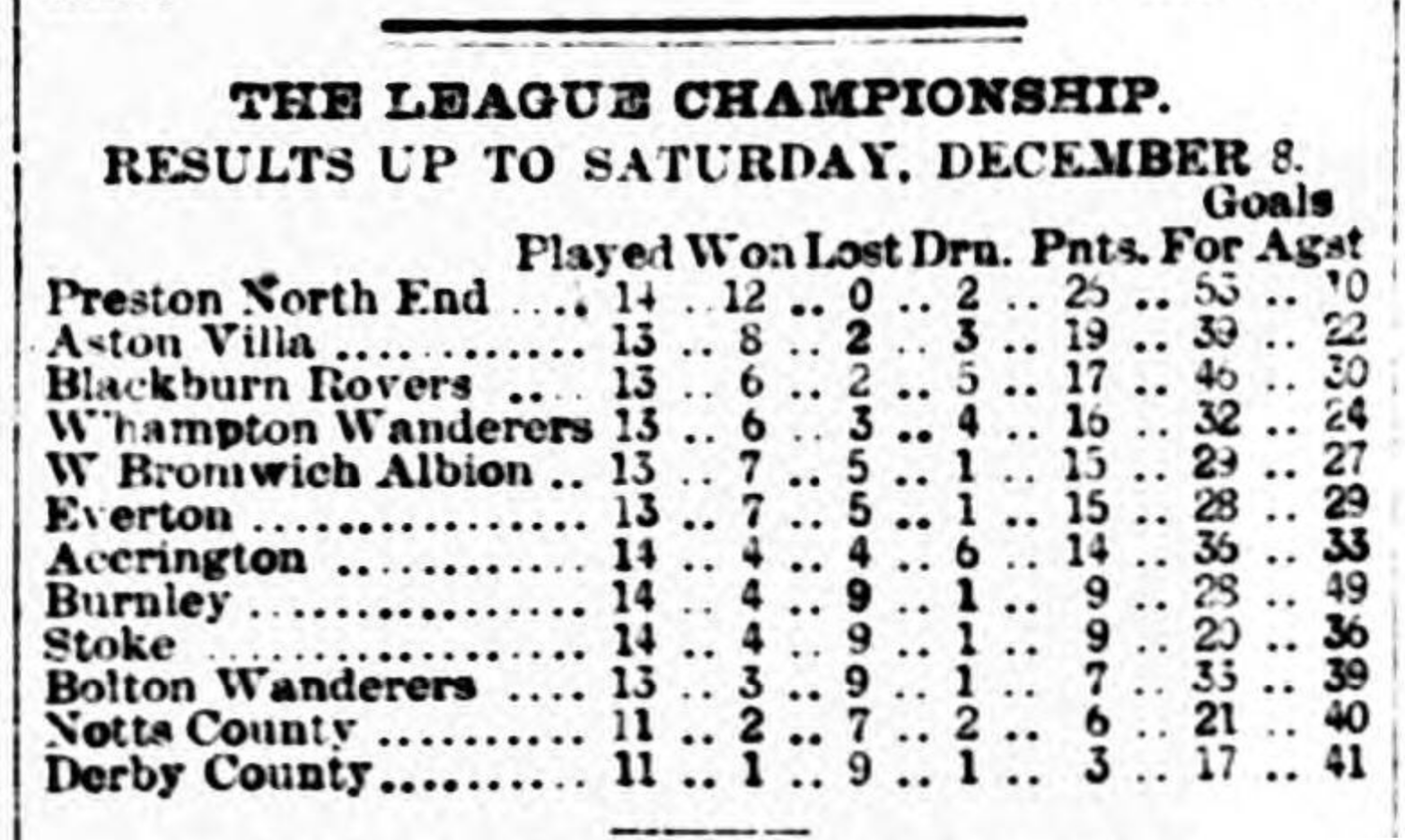
Saturday 8 December 1888

== Final league table ==
| Pos | Team | Pld | W | D | L | GF | GA | GAv | Pts |
|---|---|---|---|---|---|---|---|---|---|
| 2 | Aston Villa | 22 | 12 | 5 | 5 | 61 | 43 | 1.419 | 29 |
| 3 | Wolverhampton Wanderers | 22 | 12 | 4 | 6 | 51 | 37 | 1.378 | 28 |
| 4 | Blackburn Rovers | 22 | 10 | 6 | 6 | 66 | 45 | 1.467 | 26 |
| 5 | Bolton Wanderers | 22 | 10 | 2 | 10 | 63 | 59 | 1.068 | 22 |
| 6 | West Bromwich Albion | 22 | 10 | 2 | 10 | 40 | 46 | 0.870 | 22 |

Source: World Football
Rules for classification: 1) Points; 2) Goal average; 3) Goals scored

== Results ==
Blackburn Rovers's score comes first

=== Legend ===
| Win | Draw | Loss |

=== Football League ===
| Match | Date | Opponent | Venue | Result | Attendance | Scorers |
|---|---|---|---|---|---|---|
| 1 | 15 September 1888 | Accrington | H | 5–5 | 4,000 | Beresford, Southworth, Fecitt, Townley (2) |
| 2 | 22 September 1888 | West Bromwich Albion | H | 6–2 | 8,000 | Townley, Walton, Fecitt (2), Southworth |
| 3 | 29 September 1888 | Wolverhampton Wanderers | A | 2–2 | 5,000 | Southworth (2) |
| 4 | 6 October 1888 | Notts County | A | 3–3 | 4,000 | Fecitt, Townley, Walton |
| 5 | 13 October 1888 | Aston Villa | A | 1–6 | 5,000 | Walton |
| 6 | 20 October 1888 | Wolverhampton Wanderers | H | 2–2 | 3,500 | Haresnape, Unknown |
| 7 | 27 October 1888 | Stoke | H | 5–2 | 3,000 | Walton (2), Southworth, Fecitt, Townley |
| 8 | 3 November 1888 | Burnley | A | 7–1 | 3,000 | Fecitt (2), Southworth (3), Beresford, Forrest |
| 9 | 10 November 1888 | Everton | H | 3–0 | 6,000 | Almond, Walton, Unknown |
| 10 | 17 November 1888 | Aston Villa | H | 5–1 | 9,500 | Southworth (3), Fecitt (2) |
| 11 | 24 November 1888 | Derby County | A | 2–0 | 3,000 | Southworth, Fecitt |
| 12 | 1 December 1888 | Stoke | A | 1–2 | 5,000 | Beresford |
| 13 | 8 December 1888 | Bolton Wanderers | H | 4–4 | 4,000 | Townley (2), Beresford, Stothert |
| 14 | 15 December 1888 | Notts County | H | 5–2 | 4,000 | Southworth (4), Unknown |
| 15 | 22 December 1888 | West Bromwich Albion | A | 1–2 | 1,000 | Fecitt |
| 16 | 29 December 1888 | Preston North End | A | 0–1 | 8,000 | |
| 17 | 12 January 1889 | Preston North End | H | 2–2 | 10,000 | Walton, Fecitt |
| 18 | 19 January 1889 | Accrington | A | 2–0 | 4,000 | Southworth, McLellan (o.g.) |
| 19 | 26 January 1889 | Bolton Wanderers | A | 2–3 | 6,000 | Southworth, Walton |
| 20 | 4 February 1889 | Burnley | H | 4–2 | 2,000 | Southworth (2), Walton, Townley |
| 21 | 30 March 1889 | Everton | A | 1–3 | 7,000 | Whittaker |
| 22 | 15 April 1889 | Derby County | H | 3–0 | 4,000 | Mitchell (2), Haresnape |

=== FA Cup ===
| Round | Date | Opponent | Venue | Result | Attendance | Scorers |
|---|---|---|---|---|---|---|
| R1 | 2 February 1889 | Accrington | A | 1–1 | 3,000 | Unknown |
| R1 Replay | 9 February 1889 | Accrington | H | 5–0 | 8,000 | Haresnape (2), Barton, Townley, Walton |
| R2 | | Swifts | H | | | Swifts withdrew |
| R3 | 2 March 1889 | Aston Villa | H | 8–1 | 12,000 | Haresnape (3), Southworth (4), Warner (o.g.) |
| Semi final | 19 March 1889 | Wolverhampton Wanderers | N | 1–1 | 15,000 | Haresnape |
| Semi final replay | 23 March 1889 | Wolverhampton Wanderers | N | 1–3 | 9,000 | Townley |

== Appearances ==
| Pos. | Name | League | | FA Cup | | Total | |
| Pos. | Name | Apps | Goals | Apps | Goals | Apps | Goals |
|---|---|---|---|---|---|---|---|
| HB | (England) Willie Almond | 21 | 1 | 5 | 0 | 26 | 1 |
| GK | (England) Herby Arthur | 15 | 0 | 5 | 0 | 20 | 0 |
| HB | (England) John Barton | 5 | 0 | 1 | 1 | 6 | 1 |
| FW | (England) James Beresford | 12 | 4 | 1 | 0 | 13 | 4 |
| FB | (England) Joe Beverley | 8 | 0 | 0 | 0 | 8 | 0 |
| FW | (England) James Brown | 4 | 0 | 0 | 0 | 4 | 0 |
| HB | (Scotland) Jimmy Douglas | 21 | 0 | 5 | 0 | 26 | 0 |
| U | (England) James Duerden | 2 | 0 | 0 | 0 | 2 | 0 |
| FW | (England) Harry Fecitt | 17 | 12 | 5 | 0 | 22 | 12 |
| FB | (Scotland) John Forbes | 16 | 0 | 5 | 0 | 21 | 0 |
| HB | (England) Jimmy Forrest | 19 | 1 | 5 | 0 | 24 | 1 |
| FW | (England) Robert Haresnape | 9 | 2 | 4 | 6 | 13 | 8 |
| GK | (England) William Holden | 1 | 0 | 0 | 0 | 1 | 0 |
| GK | (England) Billy McOwen | 5 | 0 | 0 | 0 | 5 | 0 |
| FW | (England) W. Mitchell | 1 | 2 | 0 | 0 | 1 | 2 |
| FW | (England) Robert Porter | 1 | 0 | 0 | 0 | 1 | 0 |
| FW | (England) Jack Southworth | 21 | 17 | 5 | 4 | 26 | 21 |
| FB | (England) James Southworth | 19 | 0 | 4 | 0 | 23 | 0 |
| FW | (England) James Stothert | 1 | 1 | 0 | 0 | 1 | 1 |
| GK | (Scotland) Fergus Suter | 1 | 0 | 0 | 0 | 1 | 0 |
| FW | (England) William Townley | 19 | 8 | 5 | 2 | 24 | 10 |
| FW | (England) Nat Walton | 20 | 10 | 5 | 1 | 25 | 11 |
| FW | (England) Bernard Whittaker | 4 | 1 | 0 | 0 | 4 | 1 |

== See also ==
- 1888–89 in English football
- List of Blackburn Rovers F.C. seasons
