= 1889–90 British Home Championship =

Tournament details
- Host country: England, Ireland, Scotland and Wales
- Dates: 9 February – 5 April 1890
- Teams: 4

Final positions
- Champions: England; Scotland (shared)

Tournament statistics
- Matches played: 6
- Goals scored: 33 (5.5 per match)
- Top scorer: (Scotland) William Paul (4 goals)

The 1889–90 British Home Championship was an edition of the annual international football tournament played between the British Home Nations. The seventh such competition held, the 1890 edition was, for the second time, jointly won by England and Scotland, the sixth time that Scotland had won. Played during the second half of the 1889/90 season, the tournament was also notable for two matches played by England on the 15 March against Wales and Ireland simultaneously. With an increasingly crowded domestic schedule cramping available dates for matches, England fielded two entirely separate teams, both of which won their games with an aggregate of twelve goals to two.

Wales took the early lead in the competition, winning the opening game at home against Ireland. England's double victories over Wales and Ireland then placed them in front with favourites Scotland still to play a match. Scotland responded to England's lead with two comfortable wins over Wales and Ireland 5–0 and 4–1 leaving the final match between England and Scotland as the deciding game. Despite a furious and dramatic encounter, neither side could best the other and the result was a 1–1 draw, placing both England and Scotland at the head of the table, goal difference not at this stage being used to differentiate the teams.

== Table ==
| Team | Pld | W | D | L | GF | GA | GD | Pts |
|---|---|---|---|---|---|---|---|---|
| England (C) | 3 | 2 | 1 | 0 | 13 | 3 | +10 | 5 |
| Scotland (C) | 3 | 2 | 1 | 0 | 10 | 2 | +8 | 5 |
| Wales | 3 | 1 | 0 | 2 | 6 | 10 | −4 | 2 |
| Ireland | 3 | 0 | 0 | 3 | 4 | 18 | −14 | 0 |

Rules for classification: 1) points. The points system worked as follows: 2 points for a win and 1 point for a draw
(C) Champions

== Results ==
8 February 1890

| Wales | 5–2 | Ireland |
|---|---|---|
| Owen; Wilcock; Lewis; Pryce-Jones | | Dalton |

Old Racecourse, Shrewsbury
Attendance: 3,000
Referee: James McKillop (Scotland)

15 March 1890

| Wales | 1–3 | England |
|---|---|---|
| Lewis | | Currey; Lindley |

Racecourse Ground, Wrexham
Attendance: 5,000
Referee: James Walker (Scotland)

15 March 1890

| Ireland | 1–9 | England |
|---|---|---|
| Reynolds | | Geary; Davenport; Townley; Lofthouse; Barton |

Ulster Cricket Ground, Belfast
Attendance: 3,500
Referee: James McKillop (Scotland)

22 March 1890

| Scotland | 5–0 | Wales |
|---|---|---|
| Wilson 20'; Paul 36', 43', 60', 70' |

Underwood Park, Paisley
Attendance: 7,500
Referee: William Finlay (Ireland)

29 March 1890

| Ireland | 1–4 | Scotland |
|---|---|---|
| Peden 25' | | Rankin 10', 70', 80'; Wyllie 50' |

Ulster Cricket Ground, Belfast
Attendance: 5,000
Referee: William H. Stacey (England)

5 April 1890

| Scotland | 1–1 | England |
|---|---|---|
| McPherson 37' | | Wood 17' |

Hampden Park, Glasgow
Attendance: 26,379
Referee: John Reid (Ireland)

== Winning squads ==
- England

| Name | Apps/Goals by opponent | | | Total | |
| Name | (Wales) WAL | (Ireland) IRE | (Scotland) SCO | Apps | Goals |
|---|---|---|---|---|---|
| Edmund Currey | 1/2 | | 1 | 2 | 2 |
| Harry Wood | 1 | | 1/1 | 2 | 1 |
| Tinsley Lindley | 1/1 | | 1 | 2 | 1 |
| Billy Bassett | 1 | | 1 | 2 | 0 |
| Harry Daft | 1 | | 1 | 2 | 0 |
| Billy Moon | 1 | | 1 | 2 | 0 |
| Alfred Shelton | 1 | | 1 | 2 | 0 |
| Arthur Walters | 1 | | 1 | 2 | 0 |
| Percy Walters | 1 | | 1 | 2 | 0 |
| Fred Geary | | 1/3 | | 1 | 3 |
| Kenny Davenport | | 1/2 | | 1 | 2 |
| William Townley | | 1/2 | | 1 | 2 |
| Joe Lofthouse | | 1/1 | | 1 | 1 |
| John Barton | | 1/1 | | 1 | 1 |
| Harry Allen | | | 1 | 1 | 0 |
| Johnny Holt | 1 | | | 1 | 0 |
| Richard Baugh | | 1 | | 1 | 0 |
| Jimmy Forrest | | 1 | | 1 | 0 |
| Charlie Mason | | 1 | | 1 | 0 |
| Charlie Perry | | 1 | | 1 | 0 |
| Bob Roberts | | 1 | | 1 | 0 |
| Nathaniel Walton | | 1 | | 1 | 0 |

- Scotland

| Name | Apps/Goals by opponent | | | Total | |
| Name | (Wales) WAL | (Ireland) IRE | (England) ENG | Apps | Goals |
|---|---|---|---|---|---|
| Willie Paul | 1/4 | | | 1 | 4 |
| Gilbert Rankin | | 1/3 | | 1 | 3 |
| John McPherson | | | 1/1 | 1 | 1 |
| Hughie Wilson | 1/1 | | | 1 | 1 |
| Thomas Wyllie | | 1/1 | | 1 | 1 |
| Walter Arnott | | | 1 | 1 | 0 |
| William Berry | | | 1 | 1 | 0 |
| Willie Groves | | | 1 | 1 | 0 |
| William Johnston | | | 1 | 1 | 0 |
| James Kelly | | | 1 | 1 | 0 |
| James McCall | | | 1 | 1 | 0 |
| Thomas McKeown | | | 1 | 1 | 0 |
| James McLaren | | | 1 | 1 | 0 |
| Thomas Robertson | | | 1 | 1 | 0 |
| James Wilson | | | 1 | 1 | 0 |
| Davie Baird | | 1 | | 1 | 0 |
| Isaac Begbie | | 1 | | 1 | 0 |
| Jack Bell | | 1 | | 1 | 0 |
| Richard Hunter | | 1 | | 1 | 0 |
| John McLeod | | 1 | | 1 | 0 |
| John McPherson | | 1 | | 1 | 0 |
| David Mitchell | | 1 | | 1 | 0 |
| John Rae | | 1 | | 1 | 0 |
| Johnny Russell | | 1 | | 1 | 0 |
| Andrew Brown | 1 | | | 1 | 0 |
| Bob Brown | 1 | | | 1 | 0 |
| Daniel Bruce | 1 | | | 1 | 0 |
| James Dunlop | 1 | | | 1 | 0 |
| George Gillespie | 1 | | | 1 | 0 |
| Matt McQueen | 1 | | | 1 | 0 |
| John W. Murray | 1 | | | 1 | 0 |
| Andrew Whitelaw | 1 | | | 1 | 0 |
| Frank Watt | 1 | | | 1 | 0 |
