= List of Blackburn Rovers F.C. seasons =

Blackburn Rovers were established in 1875, becoming a founding member of The Football League in 1888 and the Premier League in 1992. In 1890, Rovers moved to Ewood Park. They have been English champions three times, and have won six FA Cups, one Football League Cup and one Full Members' Cup. The club has spent most of its existence in the top flight of English football.

Chart showing the progress of Blackburn Rovers F.C. through the English football league system from the inaugural season in 1888–89 to present

The table below details the club's achievements in all national competitions, from their first FA Cup campaign in 1879–80 up until the most recent completed season.

== Seasons ==
| Season | League | | | | | | | | | | FA Cup | League Cup | Other Cup (Note: Appearances in the Anglo-Scottish Cup 1975–79, Full Members' Cup 1986–91, FA Charity Shield, UEFA Cup, UEFA Champions League and EFL Trophy.) | Avg. att. (Note: Average attendance for league matches only.) | Top goalscorer(s) (Note: Top goalscorer statistics include goals scored in league matches only.) | |
| Season | Tier | Division | Pld | W | D | L | GF | GA | Pts | Pos | FA Cup | League Cup | Other Cup | Avg. att. | Player(s) | Goals |
|---|---|---|---|---|---|---|---|---|---|---|---|---|---|---|---|---|
| 1879–80 | N/A (Note: League football did not start until 1888 when the Football League was formed.) | | | | | | | | | | R3 | – | – | – | – | – |
| 1880–81 | N/A | | | | | | | | | | R2 | – | – | – | – | – |
| 1881–82 | N/A | | | | | | | | | | RU (Note: Blackburn Rovers was the first provincial team to reach the FA Cup Final, but the result was a 1–0 defeat by the Old Etonians.) | – | – | – | – | – |
| 1882–83 | N/A | | | | | | | | | | R2 | – | – | – | – | – |
| 1883–84 | N/A | | | | | | | | | | W | – | – | – | – | – |
| 1884–85 | N/A | | | | | | | | | | W | – | – | – | – | – |
| 1885–86 | N/A | | | | | | | | | | W | – | – | – | – | – |
| 1886–87 | N/A | | | | | | | | | | R2 | – | – | – | – | – |
| 1887–88 | N/A | | | | | | | | | | QF | – | – | – | – | – |
| 1888–89 | 1 | Football League (Note: The Football League was formed in 1888 with Blackburn one of twelve founding member clubs.) | 22 | 10 | 6 | 6 | 66 | 45 | 26 | 4th | SF | – | – | 5,505 | John Southworth | 16 |
| 1889–90 | 1 | Football League | 22 | 12 | 3 | 7 | 78 | 41 | 27 | 3rd | W | – | – | 7,205 | | |
| 1890–91 | 1 | Football League | 22 | 11 | 2 | 9 | 52 | 43 | 24 | 6th | W | – | – | 7,805 | | |
| 1891–92 | 1 | Football League | 26 | 10 | 6 | 10 | 58 | 65 | 26 | 9th | R2 | – | – | 5,105 | | |
| 1892–93 | 1 | Div 1 (Note: The Second Division was introduced in 1892 and thus the top division was renamed the First Division.) | 30 | 8 | 13 | 9 | 47 | 56 | 29 | 9th | SF | – | – | 5,970 | | |
| 1893–94 | 1 | Div 1 | 30 | 16 | 2 | 12 | 69 | 53 | 34 | 4th | SF | – | – | 6,420 | | |
| 1894–95 | 1 | Div 1 | 30 | 11 | 10 | 9 | 59 | 49 | 32 | 5th | R2 | – | – | 7,910 | | |
| 1895–96 | 1 | Div 1 | 30 | 12 | 5 | 13 | 40 | 50 | 29 | 8th | R1 | – | – | 7,810 | | |
| 1896–97 | 1 | Div 1 | 30 | 11 | 3 | 16 | 35 | 62 | 25 | 14th | QF | – | – | 7,005 | | |
| 1897–98 | 1 | Div 1 | 30 | 7 | 10 | 13 | 39 | 54 | 24 | 15th | R1 | – | – | 7,845 | | |
| 1898–99 | 1 | Div 1 | 34 | 14 | 8 | 12 | 60 | 52 | 36 | 6th | R1 | – | – | 8,920 | | |
| 1899–1900 | 1 | Div 1 | 34 | 13 | 4 | 17 | 49 | 61 | 30 | 14th | R2 | – | – | 6,725 | | |
| 1900–01 | 1 | Div 1 | 34 | 12 | 9 | 13 | 39 | 47 | 33 | 9th | R1 | – | – | 6,225 | | |
| 1901–02 | 1 | Div 1 | 34 | 15 | 6 | 13 | 52 | 48 | 36 | 4th | R1 | – | – | 7,950 | | |
| 1902–03 | 1 | Div 1 | 34 | 12 | 5 | 17 | 44 | 63 | 29 | 16th | R2 | – | – | 8,080 | | |
| 1903–04 | 1 | Div 1 | 34 | 11 | 6 | 17 | 48 | 60 | 28 | 15th | QF | – | – | 9,395 | | |
| 1904–05 | 1 | Div 1 | 34 | 11 | 5 | 18 | 40 | 51 | 26 | 13th | R1 | – | – | 11,145 | | |
| 1905–06 | 1 | Div 1 | 38 | 16 | 8 | 14 | 54 | 52 | 40 | 9th | R1 | – | – | 12,920 | | |
| 1906–07 | 1 | Div 1 | 38 | 14 | 7 | 17 | 56 | 59 | 35 | 12th | R2 | – | – | 12,265 | | |
| 1907–08 | 1 | Div 1 | 38 | 12 | 12 | 14 | 51 | 63 | 36 | 15th | R1 | – | – | 13,270 | | |
| 1908–09 | 1 | Div 1 | 38 | 14 | 13 | 11 | 61 | 50 | 41 | 4th | R3 | – | – | 14,745 | | |
| 1909–10 | 1 | Div 1 | 38 | 18 | 9 | 11 | 73 | 55 | 45 | 3rd | R3 | – | – | 13,805 | | |
| 1910–11 | 1 | Div 1 | 38 | 13 | 11 | 14 | 62 | 54 | 37 | 12th | SF | – | – | 14,350 | | |
| 1911–12 | 1 | Div 1 | 38 | 20 | 9 | 9 | 60 | 43 | 49 | 1st | SF | – | – | 17,765 | | |
| 1912–13 | 1 | Div 1 | 38 | 16 | 13 | 9 | 79 | 43 | 45 | 5th | QF | – | – | 18,560 | | |
| 1913–14 | 1 | Div 1 | 38 | 20 | 11 | 7 | 78 | 42 | 51 | 1st | R3 | – | – | 22,295 | | |
| 1914–15 | 1 | Div 1 | 38 | 18 | 7 | 13 | 83 | 61 | 43 | 3rd | R1 | – | – | 12,740 | | |
The Football League and FA Cup were suspended until after the First World War.
| 1919–20 | 1 | Div 1 | 42 | 13 | 11 | 18 | 64 | 77 | 37 | 20th | R1 | – | – | 18,110 | | |
| 1920–21 | 1 | Div 1 | 42 | 13 | 15 | 14 | 57 | 59 | 41 | 11th | R1 | – | – | 27,930 | | |
| 1921–22 | 1 | Div 1 | 42 | 13 | 12 | 17 | 54 | 57 | 38 | 15th | R3 | – | – | 23,580 | | |
| 1922–23 | 1 | Div 1 | 42 | 14 | 12 | 16 | 47 | 62 | 40 | 14th | R2 | – | – | 18,755 | | |
| 1923–24 | 1 | Div 1 | 42 | 17 | 11 | 14 | 54 | 50 | 45 | 8th | R1 | – | – | 18,520 | | |
| 1924–25 | 1 | Div 1 | 42 | 11 | 13 | 18 | 53 | 66 | 35 | 16th | SF | – | – | 16,340 | | |
| 1925–26 | 1 | Div 1 | 42 | 15 | 11 | 16 | 91 | 80 | 41 | 12th | R4 | – | – | 17,775 | | |
| 1926–27 | 1 | Div 1 | 42 | 15 | 8 | 19 | 77 | 96 | 38 | 18th | R3 | – | – | 18,891 | | |
| 1927–28 | 1 | Div 1 | 42 | 16 | 9 | 17 | 66 | 78 | 41 | 12th | W | – | – | 19,120 | | |
| 1928–29 | 1 | Div 1 | 42 | 17 | 11 | 14 | 72 | 63 | 45 | 7th | QF | – | – | 16,841 | | |
| 1929–30 | 1 | Div 1 | 42 | 19 | 7 | 16 | 99 | 93 | 45 | 6th | R5 | – | – | 18,714 | | |
| 1930–31 | 1 | Div 1 | 42 | 17 | 8 | 17 | 83 | 84 | 42 | 10th | R5 | – | – | 15,701 | | |
| 1931–32 | 1 | Div 1 | 42 | 16 | 6 | 20 | 89 | 95 | 38 | 16th | R4 | – | – | 13,176 | | |
| 1932–33 | 1 | Div 1 | 42 | 14 | 10 | 18 | 76 | 102 | 38 | 15th | R4 | – | – | 12,944 | | |
| 1933–34 | 1 | Div 1 | 42 | 18 | 7 | 17 | 74 | 81 | 43 | 8th | R3 | – | – | 14,005 | | |
| 1934–35 | 1 | Div 1 | 42 | 14 | 11 | 17 | 66 | 78 | 39 | 15th | R5 | – | – | 13,166 | | |
| 1935–36 | 1 | Div 1 | 42 | 12 | 9 | 21 | 55 | 96 | 33 | 22nd↓ | R4 | – | – | 15,498 | | |
| 1936–37 | 2 | Div 2 | 42 | 16 | 10 | 16 | 70 | 62 | 42 | 12th | R3 | – | – | 14,821 | | |
| 1937–38 | 2 | Div 2 | 42 | 14 | 10 | 18 | 71 | 80 | 38 | 16th | R3 | – | – | 14,779 | | |
| 1938–39 | 2 | Div 2 | 42 | 25 | 5 | 12 | 94 | 60 | 55 | 1st↑ | QF | – | – | 18,262 | | |
| 1939–40 (Note: 1939–40 season was abandoned after three league matches due to the outbreak of the Second World War. All results were annulled.) | 1 | Div 1 | 3 | 0 | 1 | 2 | 3 | 5 | 1 | – | – | – | – | – | – | – |
The Football League and FA Cup were suspended until after the Second World War.
| 1945–46 | N/A | | | | | | | | | | R3 (Note: The FA Cup was contested in 1945–46 but the Football League did not resume until the following season.) | – | – | – | – | – |
| 1946–47 | 1 | Div 1 | 42 | 14 | 8 | 20 | 45 | 53 | 36 | 17th | R5 | – | – | 26,367 | | |
| 1947–48 | 1 | Div 1 | 42 | 11 | 10 | 21 | 45 | 53 | 36 | 21st↓ | R4 | – | – | 27,883 | | |
| 1948–49 | 2 | Div 2 | 42 | 15 | 8 | 19 | 53 | 63 | 38 | 14th | R3 | – | – | 22,421 | | |
| 1949–50 | 2 | Div 2 | 42 | 14 | 10 | 18 | 55 | 60 | 38 | 16th | R3 | – | – | 22,351 | | |
| 1950–51 | 2 | Div 2 | 42 | 19 | 8 | 15 | 65 | 66 | 46 | 6th | R3 | – | – | 24,830 | | |
| 1951–52 | 2 | Div 2 | 42 | 17 | 6 | 19 | 54 | 63 | 40 | 14th | SF | – | – | 23,228 | | |
| 1952–53 | 2 | Div 2 | 42 | 18 | 8 | 16 | 68 | 65 | 44 | 9th | R3 | – | – | 23,157 | | |
| 1953–54 | 2 | Div 2 | 42 | 23 | 9 | 10 | 86 | 50 | 55 | 3rd | R4 | – | – | 26,123 | | |
| 1954–55 | 2 | Div 2 | 42 | 22 | 6 | 14 | 114 | 79 | 50 | 6th | R3 | – | – | 26,928 | | |
| 1955–56 | 2 | Div 2 | 42 | 21 | 6 | 15 | 84 | 65 | 48 | 4th | R5 | – | – | 23,049 | | |
| 1956–57 | 2 | Div 2 | 42 | 21 | 10 | 11 | 83 | 75 | Pts | 4th | R3 | – | – | 23,091 | | |
| 1957–58 | 2 | Div 2 | 42 | 22 | 12 | 8 | 93 | 57 | Pts | 2nd↑ | SF | – | – | 22,705 | | |
| 1958–59 | 1 | Div 1 | 42 | 17 | 10 | 15 | 76 | 70 | 44 | 10th | R4 | – | – | 30,544 | | |
| 1959–60 | 1 | Div 1 | 42 | 16 | 5 | 21 | 60 | 70 | 37 | 17th | RU | – | – | 27,299 | | |
| 1960–61 | 1 | Div 1 | 42 | 15 | 13 | 14 | 77 | 76 | 43 | 8th | R5 | R4 (Note: Football League Cup was introduced in the 1960–61 season.) | – | 19,344 | | |
| 1961–62 | 1 | Div 1 | 42 | 14 | 11 | 17 | 50 | 58 | 39 | 16th | QF | SF | – | 15,906 | | |
| 1962–63 | 1 | Div 1 | 42 | 15 | 12 | 15 | 79 | 71 | 42 | 11th | R3 | QF | – | 16,001 | | |
| 1963–64 | 1 | Div 1 | 42 | 18 | 10 | 14 | 89 | 65 | 46 | 7th | R5 | R2 | – | 21,543 | | |
| 1964–65 | 1 | Div 1 | 42 | 16 | 10 | 16 | 83 | 79 | 42 | 10th | R3 | R3 | – | 16,110 | | |
| 1965–66 | 1 | Div 1 | 42 | 8 | 4 | 30 | 57 | 88 | 20 | 22nd↓ | QF | R2 | – | 13,513 | | |
| 1966–67 | 2 | Div 2 | 42 | 19 | 13 | 10 | 56 | 46 | 51 | 4th | R3 | R4 | – | 14,721 | | |
| 1967–68 | 2 | Div 2 | 42 | 16 | 11 | 15 | 56 | 49 | 43 | 8th | R3 | R4 | – | 13,531 | | |
| 1968–69 | 2 | Div 2 | 42 | 13 | 11 | 18 | 52 | 63 | 37 | 19th | R5 | R3 | – | 10,617 | | |
| 1969–70 | 2 | Div 2 | 42 | 20 | 7 | 15 | 54 | 50 | 47 | 8th | R3 | R3 | – | 12,523 | | |
| 1970–71 | 2 | Div 2 | 42 | 6 | 15 | 21 | 37 | 69 | 27 | 21st↓ | R3 | R2 | – | 8,034 | | |
| 1971–72 | 3 | Div 3 | 46 | 19 | 9 | 18 | 54 | 57 | 47 | 10th | R1 | R2 | – | 8,256 | | |
| 1972–73 | 3 | Div 3 | 46 | 20 | 15 | 11 | 57 | 47 | 55 | 3rd | R2 | R1 | – | 9,214 | | |
| 1973–74 | 3 | Div 3 | 46 | 18 | 10 | 18 | 62 | 64 | 46 | 13th (Note: Lowest League finish.) | R3 | R2 | – | 7,432 | | |
| 1974–75 | 3 | Div 3 | 46 | 22 | 16 | 8 | 68 | 45 | 60 | 1st↑ | R3 | R3 | – | 12,651 | | |
| 1975–76 | 2 | Div 2 | 42 | 12 | 14 | 16 | 45 | 50 | 38 | 15th | R3 | R1 | QF (Note: Blackburn competed in the inaugural Anglo-Scottish Cup in 1975, losing 1–2 on aggregate to Motherwell at the quarter-final stage.) | 10,489 | | |
| 1976–77 | 2 | Div 2 | 42 | 15 | 9 | 18 | 42 | 54 | 39 | 12th | R5 | R2 | Grp | 10,130 | | |
| 1977–78 | 2 | Div 2 | 42 | 16 | 13 | 13 | 56 | 60 | 45 | 5th | R4 | R2 | QF (Note: Beaten at the quarter-final stage of the 1977–78 Anglo-Scottish Cup 1–3 on aggregate by Scottish side Hibernians.) | 12,227 | | |
| 1978–79 | 2 | Div 2 | 42 | 10 | 10 | 22 | 41 | 72 | 30 | 22nd↓ | R4 | R2 | Grp | 8,640 | | |
| 1979–80 | 3 | Div 3 | 46 | 25 | 9 | 12 | 58 | 36 | 59 | 2nd↑ | R5 | R2 | – | 10,311 | | |
| 1980–81 | 2 | Div 2 | 42 | 16 | 18 | 8 | 42 | 29 | 50 | 4th | R3 | R3 | – | 11,684 | | |
| 1981–82 | 2 | Div 2 | 42 | 16 | 11 | 15 | 47 | 43 | 59 | 10th | R3 | R3 | – | 8,405 | | |
| 1982–83 | 2 | Div 2 | 42 | 15 | 12 | 15 | 58 | 58 | 57 | 11th | R3 | R2 | – | 7,103 | | |
| 1983–84 | 2 | Div 2 | 42 | 17 | 16 | 9 | 57 | 46 | 67 | 6th | R5 | R2 | – | 7,623 | | |
| 1984–85 | 2 | Div 2 | 42 | 21 | 10 | 11 | 66 | 41 | 73 | 5th | R5 | R2 | – | 9,648 | | |
| 1985–86 | 2 | Div 2 | 42 | 12 | 13 | 17 | 53 | 62 | 49 | 19th | R4 | R2 | – | 5,826 | | |
| 1986–87 | 2 | Div 2 | 42 | 15 | 10 | 17 | 45 | 55 | 55 | 12th | R3 | R2 | W (Note: In 1985 the Full Members' Cup was created to compensate for English clubs being banned from European competitions. Blackburn entered for the first time in 1986–87 and won the competition, beating Charlton Athletic 1–0 at Wembley Stadium.) | 6,773 | | |
| 1987–88 | 2 | Div 2 | 44 | 21 | 14 | 9 | 68 | 52 | 77 | 5th (Note: Lost in the Second Division play-off semi-final 1–6 on aggregate to First Division side Chelsea.) | R3 | R2 | R1 | 9,503 | | |
| 1988–89 | 2 | Div 2 | 46 | 22 | 11 | 13 | 74 | 59 | 77 | 5th (Note: Lost in the Second Division play-off final 3–4 on aggregate to Crystal Palace.) | R5 | R3 | R3 | 8,891 | | |
| 1989–90 | 2 | Div 2 | 46 | 19 | 17 | 10 | 74 | 59 | 74 | 5th (Note: Lost in the Second Division play-off semi-final 2–4 on aggregate to Swindon Town.) | R3 | R3 | R1 | 9,624 | | |
| 1990–91 | 2 | Div 2 | 46 | 14 | 10 | 22 | 51 | 66 | 52 | 19th | R3 | R3 | R2 | 8,126 | | |
| 1991–92 | 2 | Div 2 | 46 | 21 | 11 | 14 | 70 | 53 | 74 | 6th↑ (Note: Promoted via the play-offs after a 1–0 win over Leicester City at Wembley Stadium.) | R4 | R1 | R1 | 13,250 | | |
| 1992–93 | 1 | Prem (Note: The Premier League was formed in 1992. Blackburn's promotion in the previous season meant they became founder members; one of only three sides to be founder members of the Football League in 1888 and the Premier League in 1992.) | 42 | 20 | 11 | 11 | 68 | 46 | 71 | 4th | QF | SF | – | 16,246 | Alan Shearer | 16 |
| 1993–94 | 1 | Prem | 42 | 25 | 9 | 8 | 63 | 36 | 84 | 2nd | R4 | R4 | – | 17,721 | Alan Shearer | 31 |
| 1994–95 | 1 | Prem | 42 | 27 | 8 | 7 | 80 | 39 | 89 | 1st | R3 | R4 | RU (Note: Blackburn lost the 1994 FA Charity Shield 2–0 to Manchester United at Wembley Stadium.) | 25,272 | Alan Shearer | 34 |
| 1994–95 | 1 | Prem | 42 | 27 | 8 | 7 | 80 | 39 | 89 | 1st | R3 | R4 | R1 (Note: Competed in European competition for the first time but lost in the 1st Round of the UEFA Cup to Trelleborgs FF 2–3 on aggregate.) | 25,272 | Alan Shearer | 34 |
| 1995–96 | 1 | Prem | 38 | 18 | 7 | 13 | 61 | 47 | 61 | 7th | R3 | R4 | RU (Note: Blackburn lost the 1995 FA Charity Shield 1–0 to Everton at Wembley Stadium.) | 27,714 | Alan Shearer | 31 |
| 1995–96 | 1 | Prem | 38 | 18 | 7 | 13 | 61 | 47 | 61 | 7th | R3 | R4 | Grp (Note: Competed in the UEFA Champions League for the first time but only won once and failed to qualify through their group containing Spartak Moscow, Legia Warsaw and Rosenborg.) | 27,714 | Alan Shearer | 31 |
| 1996–97 | 1 | Prem | 38 | 9 | 15 | 14 | 42 | 43 | 42 | 13th | R4 | R3 | – | 24,947 | Chris Sutton | 11 |
| 1997–98 | 1 | Prem | 38 | 16 | 10 | 12 | 57 | 52 | 58 | 6th | R5 | R3 | – | 25,253 | Chris Sutton | 18 |
| 1998–99 | 1 | Prem | 38 | 7 | 14 | 17 | 38 | 52 | 35 | 19th↓ | R5 | QF | R1 (Note: Lost in the 1st Round of the UEFA Cup to Olympique Lyonnais 2–3 on aggregate.) | 25,773 | Kevin Gallacher | 5 |
| 1998–99 | 1 | Prem | 38 | 7 | 14 | 17 | 38 | 52 | 35 | 19th↓ | R5 | QF | R1 | 25,773 | Ashley Ward | 5 |
| 1999–2000 | 2 | Div 1 | 46 | 15 | 17 | 14 | 55 | 51 | 62 | 11th | R5 | R3 | – | 19,253 | Lee Carsley | 10 |
| 2000–01 | 2 | Div 1 | 46 | 26 | 13 | 7 | 76 | 39 | 91 | 2nd↑ | QF | R3 | – | 20,740 | Matt Jansen | 23 |
| 2001–02 | 1 | Prem | 38 | 12 | 10 | 16 | 55 | 51 | 46 | 10th | R5 | W (Note: Beat Tottenham Hotspur 2–1 in the League Cup Final at the Millennium Stadium in Cardiff.) | – | 25,976 | Matt Jansen | 10 |
| 2002–03 | 1 | Prem | 38 | 16 | 12 | 10 | 52 | 43 | 60 | 6th | R4 | SF | R2 (Note: Beat CSKA Sofia in the 1st Round of the UEFA Cup but lost in the 2nd Round to Celtic 0–3 on aggregate.) | 26,226 | Damien Duff | 9 |
| 2003–04 | 1 | Prem | 38 | 12 | 8 | 18 | 51 | 59 | 44 | 15th | R3 | R3 | R1 (Note: Lost in the 1st Round of the UEFA Cup to Turkish side Gençlerbirliği 2–4 on aggregate.) | 24,376 | Andrew Cole | 11 |
| 2004–05 | 1 | Prem | 38 | 9 | 15 | 14 | 32 | 43 | 42 | 15th | SF | R2 | – | 22,315 | Paul Dickov | 9 |
| 2005–06 | 1 | Prem | 38 | 19 | 6 | 13 | 51 | 42 | 63 | 6th | R4 | SF | – | 21,015 | Craig Bellamy | 13 |
| 2006–07 | 1 | Prem | 38 | 15 | 11 | 14 | 41 | 55 | 50 | 10th | SF | R3 | R3 (Note: Reached the 3rd Round of the UEFA Cup but were beaten 2–4 on aggregate by Bayer Leverkusen.) | 21,275 | Benni McCarthy | 18 |
| 2007–08 | 1 | Prem | 38 | 15 | 13 | 10 | 50 | 48 | 58 | 7th | R3 | QF | R1 (Note: Reached the 1st Round of the UEFA Cup through qualification via the Inter-Toto Cup but were beaten 2–3 on aggregate by AEL.) | 23,944 | Roque Santa Cruz | 19 |
| 2008–09 | 1 | Prem | 38 | 10 | 11 | 17 | 40 | 60 | 41 | 15th | R5 | QF | – | 23,479 | Benni McCarthy | 10 |
| 2009–10 | 1 | Prem | 38 | 13 | 11 | 14 | 41 | 55 | 50 | 10th | R3 | SF | – | 25,428 | David Dunn | 9 |
| 2010–11 | 1 | Prem | 38 | 11 | 10 | 17 | 46 | 59 | 43 | 15th | R4 | R3 | – | 25,000 | Junior Hoilett Nikola Kalinić Jason Roberts | 5 |
| 2011–12 | 1 | Prem | 38 | 8 | 7 | 23 | 48 | 78 | 31 | 19th↓ | R3 | QF | – | 22,551 | Yakubu | 18 |
| 2012–13 | 2 | Chmp | 46 | 14 | 16 | 16 | 55 | 62 | 58 | 17th | QF | R2 | – | 14,997 | Jordan Rhodes | 26 |
| 2013–14 | 2 | Chmp | 46 | 18 | 16 | 12 | 70 | 62 | 70 | 8th | R3 | R1 | – | 14,962 | Jordan Rhodes | 25 |
| 2014–15 | 2 | Chmp | 46 | 17 | 16 | 13 | 66 | 59 | 67 | 9th | QF | R1 | – | 14,912 | Jordan Rhodes | 21 |
| 2015–16 | 2 | Chmp | 46 | 13 | 16 | 17 | 46 | 46 | 55 | 15th | R5 | R1 | – | 14,131 | Jordan Rhodes | 10 |
| 2016–17 | 2 | Chmp | 46 | 12 | 15 | 19 | 53 | 65 | 51 | 22nd↓ | R5 | R3 | Grp (Note: Blackburn's U23s participated in the EFL Trophy as one of the invited Academy sides but failed to qualify through the group stage.) | 12,688 | Danny Graham | 11 |
| 2017–18 | 3 | L1 | 46 | 28 | 12 | 6 | 82 | 40 | 96 | 2nd↑ | R3 | R2 | Grp (Note: Blackburn's first team participated in the EFL Trophy for the first time but failed to qualify through the group stage.) | 12,832 | Bradley Dack | 18 |
| 2018–19 | 2 | Chmp | 46 | 16 | 12 | 18 | 64 | 69 | 60 | 15th | R3 | R3 | – | 14,550 | Bradley Dack | 18 |
| 2019–20 | 2 | Chmp | 46 | 17 | 12 | 17 | 66 | 63 | 63 | 11th | R3 | R2 | – | 14,009 | Adam Armstrong | 17 |
| 2020–21 | 2 | Chmp | 46 | 15 | 12 | 19 | 65 | 54 | 57 | 15th | R3 | R2 | – | —N/a (Note: All home games in the 2020–21 season were played behind closed doors due to the COVID-19 pandemic.) | Adam Armstrong | 28 |
| 2021–22 | 2 | Chmp | 46 | 19 | 12 | 15 | 59 | 50 | 69 | 8th | R3 | R1 | – | 13,958 | Ben Brereton Díaz | 22 |
| 2022–23 | 2 | Chmp | 46 | 20 | 9 | 17 | 52 | 54 | 69 | 7th | QF | R4 | – | 14,772 | Ben Brereton Díaz | 14 |
| 2023–24 | 2 | Chmp | 46 | 14 | 11 | 21 | 60 | 74 | 53 | 19th | R5 | R4 | – | 15,583 | Sammie Szmodics | 27 |
| 2024–25 | 2 | Chmp | 46 | 19 | 9 | 18 | 53 | 48 | 66 | 7th | R4 | R2 | – | 16,212 | Yuki Ohashi | 9 |

=== Overall ===
- Seasons spent in First Division / Premier League (1st tier): 72
- Seasons spent in Second Division / Championship (2nd tier): 48
- Seasons spent in Third Division / League One (3rd tier): 6
- Seasons spent in Fourth Division / League Two (4th tier): 0

Correct up to end of 2024-25 season.
