= Jack Southworth =

English footballer (1866–1956)

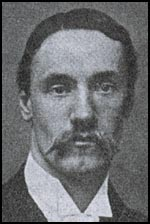

Personal information
- Full name: John Southworth
- Date of birth: 11 December 1866
- Place of birth: Blackburn, England
- Date of death: 16 October 1956 (aged 89)
- Position: Centre-forward

Youth career
- Inkerman Rangers

Senior career*
Years	Team	Apps	(Gls)
1886	Chester		
1886–1887	Blackburn Olympic		
1887–1893	Blackburn Rovers	108	(97)
1893–1894	Everton	31	(36)
Total		139	(133)

International career
1889–1892	England	3	(3)
- * Club domestic league appearances and goals

John Southworth (11 December 1866 – 16 October 1956), also known as Jack and Skimmy Southworth, was an English footballer who played in the early days of professional football for Blackburn Rovers and Everton as well as being capped three times for England.He was the top scorer in the Football League in 1890–1891 and 1893–1894.

== Playing career ==
=== Early career ===
He began his football career at the age of 7 when he helped form a junior club named Inkerman Rangers.

According to sources and Jack Southworth played for Brookhouse Perseverance F.C. before signing for Blackburn Olympic in 1883.

In 1883–84 Blackburn Olympic reached the semi-finals of the FA Cup but, as Southworth was only 17 it was unlikely he played. Blackburn Olympic were beaten 4-0 by Queen's Park (Glasgow).

While at Blackburn Olympic Southworth graduated to the first team. He was offered a place by Blackburn Rovers but refused. While at Olympic he turned out for Higher Walton and made guest appearances for Accrington and Vale of Lune, where he suffered knee injuries that threatened his career and forced him to play as a goalkeeper for a time. A keen musician, his love of music took him to Chester, where he also turned out as a goalkeeper. Just before Christmas 1886 he returned to Blackburn Olympic and was restored to his old position of centre-forward. He moved to Blackburn Rovers in 1887.

In the 1885–86 season, despite having signed professional for Chester earlier in the season, he turned out for Blackburn Olympic in their First Round FA Cup match. As a result of the subsequent FA enquiry he was suspended for four months. (Source: Shooting Stars: The History of Blackburn Olympic, p. 70)

A keen musician, he took a job with a theatre in Chester and returned to Olympic, resuming his old position of centre forward. Having overcome his injuries, he became a great success as a centre forward and the 1887–88 season saw him finally join Blackburn Rovers, together with his less-talented brother James. Both were involved in performances at the Royalty Theatre in Chester, with Jack playing the violin and James the conductor.

=== Blackburn Rovers ===
The first season of the Football League began in September 1888. Rovers' first league game took place on 15 September 1888 at Leamington Road, then home of Blackburn Rovers, when Rovers shared ten goals in an exciting encounter with Accrington. Southworth converted a cross from Harry Fecitt to score Blackburn's first goal in the league. The other scorers for Blackburn were James Beresford, Billy Townley (2) and Fecitt. Southworth scored his first hat-trick (he scored 2 in 1888–89) for Blackburn at Burnley in November. He also scored two League goals in a match twice. In the FA Cup against Aston Villa Southworth scored four goals as Blackburn registered an 8–1 victory, before going out in the semi-final to Wolverhampton Wanderers. Blackburn ended the inaugural League season in fourth place; Southworth missed only one of the 22 league games and was Blackburn's top scorer with seventeen league goals, plus four in the cup. He played in a forward-line that scored three or more goals in a League match on 11 separate occasions.

Southworth was christened the "Prince of Dribblers". A contemporary wrote that: "His dodging, his neat passing, his speed and general accuracy in shooting won the hearts of the spectators at the Leamington ground. He is built for speed, he plays an unselfish game; he's good at tackling and has excellent judgement. Arguably the finest goal-scorer in the Football League during its early years, Southworth scored in all three of his appearances for England. He won his first international cap for England against Wales on 23 February 1889 and scored one of the goals in England's 4–1 victory. Southworth also scored in the other two games he played for his country against Wales (1891) and Scotland (1892).

As Philip Gibbons points out in his book Association Football in Victorian England: "The Blackburn side had given one of the finest exhibitions of attacking football in an FA Cup Final, with England internationals, Walton, Townley, Lofthouse and John Southworth at the peak of their form."

Rovers opened the 1890–91 season with an exciting 8–5 defeat at Derby County with Southworth scoring a hat-trick. He repeated this in a 5–1 win against Aston Villa in December. In the opening week of the New Year, Rovers recorded their biggest League win of the season as Combe Hall (4), Southworth (3) and Billy Townley found the net in an 8–0 home success against Derby County. In the 7–0 FA Cup victory against Chester, Southworth netted his fourth hat-trick of the season. His next came in a 4–0 success at Accrington. Southworth missed several games through injury but still finished the season on 26 league goals (plus six in the cup) thus making him top scorer in the Football League.

Blackburn again reached the FA Cup Final in 1891. On this occasion Notts County were their opponents. In the final, played at Kennington Oval on 21 March, Rovers put County under pressure from the beginning and in the 8th minute, centre-half Geordie Dewar scored from a Townley corner. Before the end of the first-half, Southworth and Townley had added further goals. Jimmy Oswald of Notts County scored a late consolation goal but Blackburn finished comfortable 3–1 winners and won the FA Cup for the fifth time in eight years.

In the five years he spent at Blackburn Rovers he scored 97 goals in 108 league games, plus a further 22 cup goals in 21 appearances. He still holds the Blackburn record for the most individual hat-tricks in a season with five in 1890–91, and the record for the aggregate individual hat-tricks with thirteen.

=== Everton ===
Everton were to enjoy the skills of Jack Southworth for just over one season. Following his signing from Blackburn Rovers, he replaced the injured Fred Geary, making an immediate impact and soon became a great favourite with the Everton supporters. In his only full season he scored 27 goals in just 22 games, including ten in two games over the Christmas period. On 30 September 1893, he scored a goal against Sunderland in a 7-1 victory at Goodison, thus becoming the first player in League history to score 100 League goals. He scored three goals in an 8–1 victory over Sheffield Wednesday followed by six in the 7–1 victory over West Bromwich Albion on 30 December 1893; this still stands as an Everton record and was the first time a player had scored two hat-tricks in the same game in the Football League. Southworth finished his League career on 27 October 1894 (a 2-2 draw at home against Sunderland) having scored 133 League goals, a record at that time.

== After football ==
He played violin with the Halle Orchestra.

Southworth died in 1956 aged 89.

== Honours and achievements ==
Blackburn Rovers

- FA Cup winner: 1890 and 1891
- "Golden Boot" (Top scorer in Football League): 1890–91

Everton

- "Golden Boot" (Top scorer in Football League): 1893–94
