= James Southworth =

English footballer

Personal information
- Date of birth: 15 November 1864
- Place of birth: Blackburn, England
- Date of death: 18 August 1940 (aged 75)
- Place of death: New South Wales, Australia
- Position: Left-back

Youth career
- 1883–1884: Silver Star
- 1884–1886: Blackburn Olympic

Senior career*
Years	Team	Apps	(Gls)
1886	Chester		
1886–1888	Blackburn Olympic		
1888–1890	Blackburn Rovers	21	(1)
- * Club domestic league appearances and goals

James Southworth (15 November 1864 – 18 August 1940) was a footballer who played as a defender in the early days of professional football for Blackburn Rovers. He was the brother of famous England international Jack Southworth.

== Playing career ==
Southworth was born in Blackburn to Robert and Martha Southworth.

In 1883, aged 19 James Southworth signed for one of the clubs that eventually formed Blackburn Olympic. A club called Silver Star F.C. The following year, 1884, he became a player for Blackburn Olympic F.C. There is conflicting information from sources as to when he joined Chester. Some sources state 1885 and others 1886.

He played alongside his younger brother Jack Southworth for most of the early part of his career, joining him at Chester and Blackburn Olympic. At Chester he missed the 1885 Boxing Day fixture (a friendly against Chirk) as he was appearing in pantomime. In his role as a conductor, at the Royalty Theatre in Chester, he would have to be back in the city after away matches in time for 7.30pm performances, affecting the number of appearances he made for the club. On the field, an early squad summary by the Chester Chronicle said he was captain and a "dashing and safe back".

In 1888, he moved with his brother from Blackburn Olympic to their neighbours and fierce rivals Blackburn Rovers.

== Season 1888-1889 ==
The first season of the Football League began, for Blackburn Rovers, on 15 September 1888 at Leamington Road, then home of Blackburn Rovers. Southworth played at left-back in this match and Rovers drew with Accrington 5-5. James Southworth played in 19 of the 22 League matches played by Blackburn Rovers in season 1888–89. James Southworth played in the two FA Cup semi-final matches against Wolverhampton Wanderers (the first match ended 1–1). Blackburn Rovers lost the replay 3–1. As a full-back he played in a defence that achieved three clean sheets and kept the opposition to one-League-goal-in-a-match on three occasions. Blackburn Rovers ended the inaugural League season in fourth place.

He missed most of the 1889-90 league season but was selected for the FA Cup final against Sheffield Wednesday (from the Football Alliance) at The Oval on 29 March 1890. Rovers were the favourites to win in view both of their record of three victories in the previous six seasons and their superior league placing. Blackburn fielded a team consisting of nine England or Scotland internationals. Rovers lived up to expectations as they comfortably won the Cup defeating their Yorkshire opponents 6–1 with goals by Billy Townley (3), Nat Walton, Jack Southworth and Joe Lofthouse.

As Philip Gibbons wrote in his book Association Football in Victorian England: "The Blackburn side had given one of the finest exhibitions of attacking football in an FA Cup Final, with England internationals, Walton, Townley, Lofthouse and John Southworth at the peak of their form."

The F.A. Cup final was James Southworth's final appearance for Rovers. He made 21 league and 6 cup appearances.

Southworth stayed a professional musician, working in music halls. He emigrated to Australia, where he died in 1940.

== Honours ==
Blackburn Rovers

- FA Cup winner: 1890
