= 1889–90 Aston Villa F.C. season =

English football club season

Aston Villa
1889–90 season
- Manager: George Ramsay
- Ground: Wellington Road
- Football League: 8th
- FA Cup: Round 2
Home colours	Away colours

The Football League
- Season: 1889–90
- Champions: Preston North End, 2nd title
- Top goalscorer: Jimmy Ross, 24
- Biggest home win: Preston North End 10–0 Stoke (14 September 1889)
- Biggest away win: Accrington 1–8 Notts County (12 October 1889)
- Highest scoring: Preston North End 10–0 Stoke (14 September 1889); Blackburn 9–1 Notts County (16 November 1889); Wolves 9–1 Burnley (7 December 1889)
- Longest winning run: 6, Everton, Preston
- Longest unbeaten run: 7, Accrington, Blackburn, Preston North End
- Longest losing run: 10 matches Stoke

The 1889–90 English football season saw Aston Villa's 2nd season in the Football League. They started with an unbeaten opening three games including a win over champions Preston, but suffered several defeats after Christmas, winning only one of their six remaining league games to finish 8th.

Scottish centre back, Jimmy Cowan, made his debut, coming from Vale of Leven FC. He would go on to make 357 appearances for Villa, his last win seeing Small Heath knocked out of the 1901 FA Cup Quarter-final replay. There were also debuts for Albert Aldridge, Tom Clarkson, Billy Dickson, Sammy Gray, George Davis, Ike Moore, Arthur Hickton, James Connor, Jack Graham, Lewis Campbell, Bill Dickie and Jim Paton.

As late as 1901, in the warm weather months, Villa would forgo their heavier woollen club colours in favour of thin cotton red shirts. In the former top tear of English football, home and away Christmas Day fixtures were often played allowing many working people their only chance to watch a game guaranteeing football clubs large crowds. Champions Preston North End faced Aston Villa on Christmas Day 1889. Christmas fixtures were recorded as late as the 1957-58 Football League season.

== League ==
Pos	Team	Pld	W	D	L	GF	GA	GAv	Pts	Relegation
6	Accrington	22	9	6	7	53	56	0.946	24	
7	Derby County	22	9	3	10	43	55	0.782	21	
8	Aston Villa	22	7	5	10	43	51	0.843	19	
9	Bolton Wanderers	22	9	1	12	54	65	0.831	19	
10	Notts County	22	6	5	11	43	51	0.843	17	Re-elected

Source: World Football
Rules for classification: 1) Points; 2) Goal average; 3) Goals scored

7 Sep 1889 1st Round	Aston Villa	2–2	Burnley
		Report
Note: 🟨

14 Sep 1889 2nd Round	Aston Villa	1–1	Notts County
		Report
Note: 🟨

21 Sep 1889 3rd Round	Aston Villa	5–3	Preston North End
		Report
Note: 🟩 Preston's "Invincibles" were unbeaten from the previous season. They had now won their first league match to stretch their unbeaten league run to 23 games but faced a Villa team who would inflict their first-ever league defeat with a 5–3 victory.

28 Sep 1889 4th Round	Aston Villa	0–3	West Bromwich Albion
		Report
Note: 🟥

5 Oct 1889 5th Round	Aston Villa	6–2	Burnley
		Report
Note: 🟩 George Davis only got to play one game for the Aston Villa first team as Jimmy Warner, the Villa regular goalkeeper was unavailable. The 21-year-old's Club & League debut was on 5 October 1889. The venue was Turf Moor, the home of Burnley. Davis' only top-flight match was a winning appearance as Villa won 6–2. The Lancashire Evening Post described the match in its 5 October 1889 edition reports that Villa were 4-1 up at half-time. Davis was mentioned in the Post' report a couple of times in the Second-Half. "Friel elicited cheers by a long field run, accompanied by Haresnape. They passed through the (Villa) ranks, but were pulled up by Davis," The second reference in the 'Post' was "Haresnape, by a long shot, was fisted out by Davis". Davis came to notice when the he signed for St Philip's F.C. in 1888. The following year he signed for Aston Villa. Davis left Villa in 1890 and signed for Witton White Star F.C.

12 Oct 1889 6th Round	Aston Villa	7–1	Derby County
		Report
Note: 🟩

19 Oct 1889 7th Round	Aston Villa	0–7	Blackburn Rovers
		Report
Note: 🟥

26 Oct 1889 8th Round	Aston Villa	1–0	West Bromwich Albion
		Report
Note: 🟩

2 Nov 1889 9th Round	Aston Villa	2–1	Wolverhampton Wanderers
		Report
Note: 🟩

9 Nov 1889 10th Round	Aston Villa	1–1	Notts County
		Report
Note: 🟨

16 Nov 1889 11th Round	Aston Villa	0–2	Bolton Wanderers
		Report
Note: 🟥

23 Nov 1889 12th Round	Aston Villa	1–2	Everton
		Report
Note: 🟥

30 Nov 1889 13th Round	Aston Villa	2–4	Accrington
		Report
Note: Arthur Hickton signed for Aston Villa in July 1889 from Birmingham Waterworks F.C.. On 30 November 1889 at Thorneyholme Road, Accrington he made his only appearance for the Villa first-team replacing Archie Hunter at Centre-Forward. The match is reported upon by the 30 November 1889 edition of the Lancashire Evening Post. However, Hickton did not get a mention as Villa lost 4–2. He was never selected for the First-team again and left Aston Villa in November 1890.

7 Dec 1889 14th Round	Aston Villa	6–1	Stoke
		Report
Note: 🟩

21 Dec 1889 15th Round	Aston Villa	1–1	Wolverhampton Wanderers
		Report
Note: 🟨

25 Dec 1889 16th Round	Aston Villa	2–3	Preston North End
		Report
Note: 🟥

26 Dec 1889 17th Round	Aston Villa	1–2	Accrington
		Report
Note: 🟥

28 Dec 1889 18th Round	Aston Villa	0–5	Derby County
		Report
Note: 🟥

4 Jan 1890 19th Round	Aston Villa	0–7	Everton
		Report
Note: 🟥

25 Jan 1890 20th Round	Aston Villa	1–2	Bolton Wanderers
		Report
Note: 🟥

17 Mar 1890 21st Round	Aston Villa	1–1	Stoke
		Report
Note: 🟨

31 Mar 1890 22nd Round	Aston Villa	3–0	Blackburn Rovers
		Report
Note: 🟩

== FA Cup ==
- 1st Round, 18 January 1890, South Shore (Blackpool), Away, Won 4–2
- 2nd Round, 1 February 1890, Notts County, Away, Lost 1–4

== Friendlies ==
A benefit match was held for Small Heath player, Chris Charsley, ahead of his retirement; despite the admission charge being increased for the occasion, around 6,000 spectators turned up to watch a schoolboys' match followed by the main attraction. In an encounter described by the Birmingham Daily Post as "perhaps the closest and most exciting ever played on the field", Aston Villa, featuring new signing Tom McKnight, drew 2–2 with a Small Heath eleven. A substantial sum was raised.
