= 1891 FA Cup final =

1891 FA Cup Final
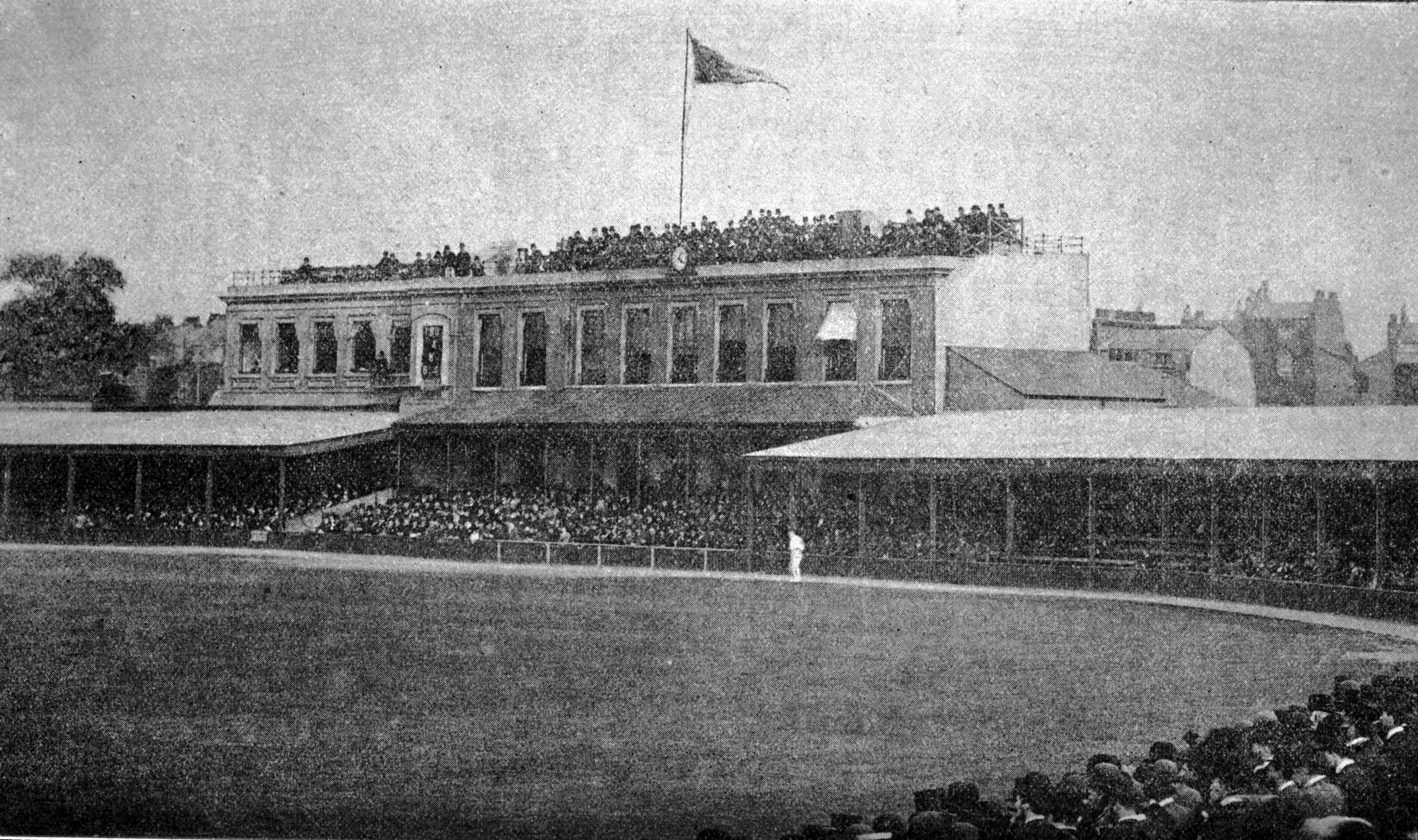
- The Kennington Oval as it looked in 1891
- Event: 1890–91 FA Cup
Blackburn Rovers	Notts County
3	1
- Date: 21 March 1891
- Venue: Kennington Oval, London
- Referee: C. J. Hughes
- Attendance: 23,000

The 1891 FA Cup final was contested by Blackburn Rovers and Notts County at the Kennington Oval. Blackburn won 3–1, their second consecutive FA Cup Final victory, with goals by Geordie Dewar, Jack Southworth and William Townley. James Oswald scored Notts County's goal.

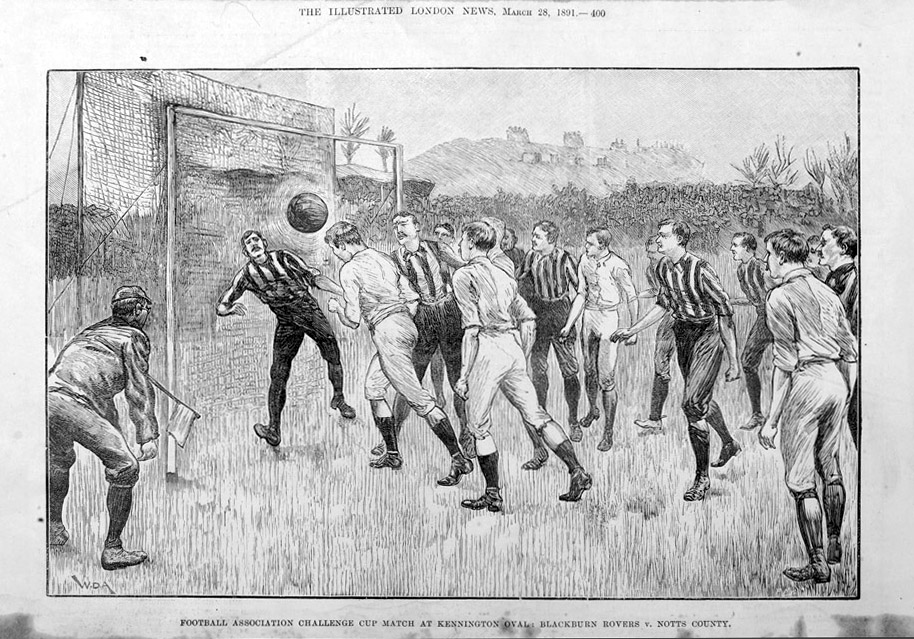
Scene of the match, as it was displayed on The Illustrated London News

== Match details ==
21 March 1891

Blackburn Rovers	3–1	Notts County
Dewar; Southworth; Townley		Oswald

Kennington Oval, London
Attendance: 23,000
Referee: C. J. Hughes

Blackburn Rovers	Notts County

GK	(England) Rowland Pennington
DF	(Scotland) Tom Brandon
DF	(Scotland) John Forbes
MF	(England) John Barton
MF	(Scotland) Geordie Dewar
MF	(England) Jimmy Forrest
FW	(England) Joe Lofthouse
FW	(England) Nat Walton
FW	(England) Jack Southworth
FW	(Scotland) Coombe Hall
FW	(England) William Townley

GK	(England) James Thraves
DF	(Scotland) Sandy Ferguson
DF	(Scotland) Jack Hendry
MF	(Scotland) Archie Osborne
MF	(Scotland) David Calderhead
MF	(England) Alf Shelton
FW	(Scotland) Andrew McGregor
FW	(Scotland) Tom McInnes
FW	(Scotland) James Oswald
FW	(England) William Locker
FW	(England) Harry Daft
