= Thraves =

Thraves is a surname. Notable people with the surname include:

- Alfred John Thraves (1888–1953), English architect
- Jamie Thraves (born 1969), British film writer and director
- James Thraves (1869–1936), English footballer
- Stephen Thraves, British children's writer
