= 1889–90 in English football =

Football in England
- Season: 1889–90

Men's football
- Football League: Preston North End
- FA Cup: Blackburn Rovers

The 1889–90 season was the 19th season of competitive football in England. Preston North End were Football League champions for the second successive season while The Wednesday finished top of the newly formed Football Alliance. Blackburn Rovers won the FA Cup.

== Football League ==
Pos	Team	Pld	W	D	L	GF	GA	GAv	Pts	Relegation
1	Preston North End (C)	22	15	3	4	71	30	2.367	33	
2	Everton	22	14	3	5	65	40	1.625	31	
3	Blackburn Rovers	22	12	3	7	78	41	1.902	27	
4	Wolverhampton Wanderers	22	10	5	7	51	38	1.342	25	
5	West Bromwich Albion	22	11	3	8	47	50	0.940	25	
6	Accrington	22	9	6	7	53	56	0.946	24	
7	Derby County	22	9	3	10	43	55	0.782	21	
8	Aston Villa	22	7	5	10	43	51	0.843	19	
9	Bolton Wanderers	22	9	1	12	54	65	0.831	19	
10	Notts County	22	6	5	11	43	51	0.843	17	Re-elected
11	Burnley	22	4	5	13	36	65	0.554	13	Re-elected
12	Stoke (R)	22	3	4	15	27	69	0.391	10	Failed re-election and demoted to the Football Alliance

Source: World Football
Rules for classification: 1) Points; 2) Goal average; 3) Goals scored
(C) Champions; (R) Relegated

== Football Alliance ==
A new competition, the Football Alliance, started this season. It was formed by 12 clubs as a rival to The Football League, which had begun in the 1888–89 season, also with 12 member clubs. The Alliance covered a similar area to the League, stretching from the Midlands to the North West, but also further east in Sheffield, Grimsby and Sunderland.

Pos	Team	Pld	W	D	L	GF	GA	GAv	Pts	Qualification or relegation
1	The Wednesday (C)	22	15	2	5	70	39	1.795	32	
2	Bootle	22	13	2	7	66	39	1.692	28	
3	Sunderland Albion	21	12	2	7	64	39	1.641	28 (Note: Sunderland Albion's point total includes two points awarded after Birmingham St George's refused to fulfil a fixture against them which had been ordered to be replayed by the management committee.)	
4	Grimsby Town	22	12	2	8	58	47	1.234	26	
5	Crewe Alexandra	22	11	2	9	68	59	1.153	24	
6	Darwen	22	10	2	10	70	75	0.933	22	
7	Birmingham St George's	21	9	3	9	62	49	1.265	21	
8	Newton Heath LYR	22	9	2	11	40	44	0.909	20	
9	Walsall Town Swifts	22	8	3	11	44	59	0.746	19	
10	Small Heath	22	6	5	11	44	67	0.657	17	
11	Nottingham Forest	22	6	5	11	31	62	0.500	17	
12	Long Eaton Rangers	22	4	2	16	35	73	0.479	10	Left and joined the Midland League

Rules for classification: 1) points; 2) goal average.
(C) Champions

== FA Cup ==
The FA Cup was won by Blackburn Rovers, who beat The Wednesday 6–1 in the 1890 FA Cup Final to lift the trophy for the fourth time.

== National team ==
In the 1889–90 British Home Championship, England played matches against Wales and Ireland on the same day, 15 March 1890, winning both comfortably. The team for the Wales match were mainly amateur players, whereas the team against Ireland were all professional players. The Irish goal was scored by Jack Reynolds, who later played for England.

In the deciding match against Scotland, the teams drew 1–1 and shared the trophy.

Date	Venue	Opponents	Score*	Competition	England scorers	Goals and times
15 March 1890	Racecourse Ground, Wrexham (A)	Wales	3–1	BHC	Edmund Currey (Oxford University); Tinsley Lindley (Nottingham Forest)	Goal
15 March 1890	Ballynafeigh Park, Belfast (A)	Ireland	9–1	BHC	Fred Geary (Everton); William Townley (Blackburn Rovers); Joe Lofthouse (Blackburn Rovers); Kenny Davenport (Bolton Wanderers); John Barton (Blackburn Rovers)	15' 60' 80'; 16' 84'; 40'; 46' 75'; 88'
5 April 1890	(Second) Hampden Park, Glasgow (A)	Scotland	1–1	BHC	Harry Wood (Wolverhampton Wanderers)	17'

* England score given first

Key

- A = Away match
- BHC = British Home Championship
