= Geordie Dewar =

Scottish footballer

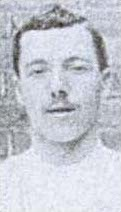

Personal information
- Full name: George Dewar
- Date of birth: 20 July 1867
- Place of birth: Dumbarton, Scotland
- Date of death: 2 September 1915 (aged 48)
- Place of death: Birmingham, England
- Position: Centre-half

Senior career*
Years	Team	Apps	(Gls)
- Dumbarton Athletic
1887–1889	Dumbarton		
1889–1897	Blackburn Rovers	174	(7)
1897–1898	New Brighton Tower		
1898–1899	Southampton	4	(0)

International career
1888–1889	Scotland	2	(1)
1891	Football League XI	1	(0)
- * Club domestic league appearances and goals

George Dewar (20 July 1867 – 2 September 1915) was a Scottish footballer who played in the early days of professional football for Blackburn Rovers as well as being capped twice for Scotland.

== Playing career ==
Dewar was born in Dumbarton, Scotland; he served his apprenticeship as a ship's upholsterer before embarking on a full-time career as a professional footballer.

A powerful centre half, he came to prominence in local football with Dumbarton Athletic before joining Dumbarton in September 1887, winning his two caps in the two subsequent years. His first cap came on 24 March 1888 in the British Home Championship match at the Solitude Ground, Belfast where he scored the opening goal in the 10–2 rout of Ireland. He also played in the 3–2 victory over England the following April.

One of the people watching the England v. Scotland game in April 1889 was Tom Mitchell, the secretary of Blackburn Rovers. He was looking to strengthen his side by buying the best players from Scotland. Mitchell persuaded Dewar to join Blackburn (along with Tom Brandon and Harry Campbell); in doing so, he brought an end to his international career as at this time Scotland did not select men playing in England. Dewar became a fixture in the Blackburn team over the next few years, playing 174 league matches; he even turned out for the Football League against their Scottish counterparts.

In the FA Cup final against Sheffield Wednesday (from the Football Alliance) at The Oval on 29 March 1890, Rovers were the odds-on favourites to win in view both of their record of three victories in the previous six seasons and their superior league placing. Blackburn fielded a team consisting of nine England or Scotland internationals. Rovers lived up to expectations as they romped away with the Cup defeating their Yorkshire opponents 6–1 with goals by Billy Townley (3), Nat Walton, Jack Southworth and Joe Lofthouse.

Blackburn reached the FA Cup Final again in 1891. On this occasion Notts County were their opponents. In the final, played at Kennington Oval on 21 March, Rovers put County under pressure from the beginning and in the 8th minute, centre-half Dewar scored from a Townley corner. Before the end of the first-half, Southworth and Townley had added further goals. Jimmy Oswald of Notts County scored a late consolation goal but Blackburn finished comfortable 3–1 winners and won the FA Cup for the fifth time in eight years.

In June 1897 he moved to New Brighton Tower and was part of the team that won the Lancashire League championship. Although New Brighton Tower would now be playing in the Second Division of The Football League he decided to move on and joined Southern League champions Southampton, who had just moved to their new home at The Dell.

At Southampton he only made four appearances in November/December 1898 replacing the injured Bob Petrie. Now in his thirties and with his best days behind him he retired from football in 1899 and returned to his native Scotland.

Dewar was the brother-in-law of Blackburn teammate Tom Brandon via marriage to sisters from the local Duckworth family, though both relationships ended acrimoniously. He died of cancer in a Birmingham hospital in 1915, aged 48.

== Honours ==
=== As a player ===
Dumbarton

- Dumbartonshire Cup winner: 1888–1889

Blackburn Rovers

- FA Cup winner: 1890 and 1891

=== Individual ===
- 2 caps for Scotland between 1888 and 1889, scoring one goal;
- 2 international trials for Scotland in 1889;
- a representative cap for Scotch Counties in 1888;
- 3 representative caps for Dumbartonshire between 1888 and 1889;
- 2 representative caps for Scots Internationalists XI in 1888.
