= James Beresford =

James Beresford may refer to:

- James Beresford (writer) (1764–1840), British writer and clergyman
- James Beresford (baseball) (born 1989), Australian baseball player
- James Beresford (footballer, born 1860) (1860–1903), English football outside right
- James Beresford (footballer, born 2002), Thai football right-back
