= Thomas Clarkson (disambiguation) =

Thomas Clarkson (1760–1846) was an English abolitionist.

Thomas Clarkson may also refer to:

- Tom Clarkson (rugby league), English rugby league footballer of the 1910s, 1920s and 1930s
- Tom Clarkson (rugby union) (born 2000), Irish rugby union player of the 2020s
- Thomas Clarkson (Upper Canada) (1800s–1874), Canadian businessman and founder of Clarkson Gordon
- Thomas S. Clarkson (1837–1894), American businessman and philanthropist
- Thomas W. Clarkson, heavy metals toxicologist
- Thomas Clarkson (footballer) (1865–1915), English footballer
- T. Henry Clarkson, American golfer and billiards player
- Tom Clarkson (Waterloo Road), a character in the TV series Waterloo Road
