= James Stothert =

English footballer

Personal information
- Date of birth: 7 April 1870
- Place of birth: Blackburn, England
- Positions: Full back; wing half

Youth career
- 1887–1888: Braeside
- 1888–1889: Bohemians (Blackburn)

Senior career*
Years	Team	Apps	(Gls)
1888–1889	Blackburn Rovers	1	(1)
1889–1891	Bohemians (Blackburn)		
1891–1892	Blackburn Rovers	0	(0)
1891–1892	Darwen Dimmocks		
1891–1892	Knuzden Rovers		
1892–1893	Brierfield		
1893–1894	Lincoln City	18	(0)
1894–1896	Notts County	23	(0)
1896–1897	Bacup		
1897–1898	Barnsley		
1898	Crewe Alexandra		
- * Club domestic league appearances and goals

James Stothert (7 April 1870 – after 1895) was an English footballer who played in The Football League for Blackburn Rovers, Lincoln City and Notts County.

== Early career ==
In 1887 aged 16/17 Stothert signed as a youth player for a club called Braeside F.C. There are no records available for this club but Braeside is a district of Blackburn. Stothert moved to another Blackburn club in 1887, Bohemians F.C. (Again no records available. He joined Blackburn Rovers in 1888.

== 1888-1889 ==
When key Blackburn Rovers player Harry Fecitt was unavailable to play in the home match against Bolton Wanderers on 8 December 1888, Rovers decided to draft in Bohemians (Blackburn) player James Stothert at Inside-Left. According to Cricket and Football Field James Stothert was not on the pitch when the match started. In fact, Rovers led Wanderers 2-0 when he came onto the pitch. Stothert appeared to have a negative impact on the Rovers team as within minutes of coming on Wanderers made it 1–2. At half-time it was 2-2. Stothert' negative impact continued into the 2nd half. He missed an open goal much to the displeasure of the Rovers crowd. Then Wanderers made it 4–2. Stothert redeemed himself by scoring to bring Rovers' back to 3–4. Rover's snatched a point with a 4th goal right at the end of the match.
