= 2008–09 Blackburn Rovers F.C. season =

Blackburn Rovers F.C.
2008–09 season
- Chairman: John Williams
- Manager: Paul Ince (until 16 December); Sam Allardyce
- Premier League: 15th
- FA Cup: Fifth round
- League Cup: Quarter-final
- Top goalscorer: Benni McCarthy (13)
Home colours	Away colours

The 2008–09 season was Blackburn Rovers' 121st season as a professional club.

The close season saw the departure of manager Mark Hughes to Manchester City. He was replaced by Paul Ince, although after a poor start to the campaign, Ince was sacked and succeeded by Sam Allardyce.

== First-team squad ==
This squad consists of all players issued with a squad number.

Last update: 3 May 2009 15:00

		Name	Age	Position	Apps	Goals	Assists	Goal ratio	Assist ratio	Goal/assist ratio
(England)	1	Paul Robinson	15 October 1979 (aged 29)	Goalkeeper	39	0	0			
(Netherlands)	2	André Ooijer	11 July 1974 (aged 34)	Defender	94	2	3	0.02	0.03	0.05
(England)	3	Stephen Warnock	12 December 1981 (aged 27)	Full Back	105	6	8	0.06	0.08	0.13
(Republic of the Congo)	4	Christopher Samba	28 March 1984 (aged 25)	Defender	96	8	6	0.08	0.06	0.15
(Turkey)	5	Tugay Kerimoğlu	24 August 1970 (aged 38)	Midfielder	291	12	12	0.04	0.04	0.08
(New Zealand)	6	Ryan Nelsen	18 October 1977 (aged 31)	Defender	144	1	2	0.01	0.01	0.02
(Australia)	7	Brett Emerton	22 February 1979 (aged 30)	Winger	230	13	29	0.06	0.13	0.18
(England)	8	David Dunn	27 December 1979 (aged 29)	Midfielder	239	40	32	0.17	0.13	0.3
(Paraguay)	9	Roque Santa Cruz	16 August 1981 (aged 27)	Forward	70	29	10	0.41	0.14	0.56
(South Africa)	10	Benni McCarthy	12 November 1977 (aged 31)	Forward	118	48	6	0.41	0.06	0.47
(Australia)	11	Vince Grella	5 October 1979 (aged 29)	Midfielder	17	0	0			
(Norway)	12	Morten Gamst Pedersen	8 September 1981 (aged 27)	Winger	199	33	46	0.17	0.23	0.4
(Georgia (country))	13	Zurab Khizanishvili	6 October 1981 (aged 27)	Defender	90	2	1	0.02	0.01	0.03
(South Africa)	15	Aaron Mokoena	25 November 1980 (aged 28)	Midfielder	137	2	7	0.01	0.05	0.07
(Republic of Ireland)	16	Steven Reid	10 March 1981 (aged 28)	Midfielder	124	7	10	0.06	0.08	0.14
(Republic of Ireland)	17	Keith Andrews	13 September 1980 (aged 28)	Midfielder	33	4	0	0.12		0.12
(Scotland)	18	Paul Gallagher	9 August 1984 (aged 24)	Winger	74	8	7	0.11	0.09	0.2
(Senegal)	18	El Hadji Diouf	15 January 1981 (aged 28)	Winger	12	1	2	0.08	0.17	0.25
(Chile)	19	Carlos Villanueva	5 February 1986 (aged 23)	Versatile	20	2	4	0.1	0.2	0.3
(France)	21	Gaël Givet	9 October 1981 (aged 27)	Defender	16	0	0			
(England)	22	Danny Simpson	4 January 1987 (aged 22)	Full Back	20	0	0			
(Republic of Ireland)	24	Keith Treacy	13 September 1988 (aged 20)	Winger	22	0	1		0.05	0.05
(Republic of Ireland)	25	Alan Judge	11 November 1988 (aged 20)	Winger	2	0	0			
(Paraguay)	26	Julio Santa Cruz	1 February 1990 (aged 19)	Forward	0	0	0			
(England)	27	Matt Derbyshire	14 April 1986 (aged 23)	Forward	85	19	10	0.22	0.12	0.34
(Northern Ireland)	28	Tony Kane	29 August 1987 (aged 21)	Full Back	0	0	0			
(Sweden)	29	Martin Olsson	17 May 1988 (aged 21)	Full-back	18	1	0	0.06		0.06
(Grenada)	30	Jason Roberts	25 January 1978 (aged 31)	Forward	84	17	13	0.2	0.15	0.36
(Scotland)	31	Bryan Hodge	23 September 1987 (aged 21)	Midfielder	0	0	0			
(Wales)	32	Jason Brown	18 May 1982 (aged 27)	Goalkeeper	8	0	0			
(England)	33	Frank Fielding	4 March 1988 (aged 21)	Goalkeeper	0	0	0			
(Faroe Islands)	34	Gunnar Nielsen	7 October 1986 (aged 22)	Goalkeeper	0	0	0			
(England)	36	Marcus Marshall	7 October 1989 (aged 19)	Forward	1	0	0			
(England)	37	Alex Marrow	21 January 1990 (aged 19)	Midfielder	0	0	0			
(England)	38	Mark Bunn	19 November 1984 (aged 24)	Goalkeeper	1	0	0			
(Republic of Ireland)	39	Aaron Doran	13 May 1991 (aged 18)	Winger	2	0	0			
(Germany)	40	Björn Bussmann	18 March 1991 (aged 18)	Goalkeeper	0	0	0			
(England)	41	Andy Haworth	28 November 1988 (aged 20)	Winger	2	0	0			
(Republic of Ireland)	42	Gavin Gunning	28 January 1991 (aged 18)	Defender	0	0	0			
(England)	43	Jamie Clarke	11 September 1988 (aged 20)	Forward	0	0	0			

== Transfers ==
=== In ===
Date	Nationality	No.	Player	Position	Previous club	Fee
	ENG	1	Paul Robinson	Goalkeeper	Tottenham Hotspur	£3,500,000
2 August 2008	CHI	19	Carlos Villanueva	Versatile	Audax Italiano	Loan
4 August 2008	ENG	22	Danny Simpson	Full-back	Manchester United	Loan
	PAR	26	Julio Santa Cruz	Forward	Cerro Porteño	Free
26 August 2008	AUS	11	Vince Grella	Midfielder	Torino	£4,000,000
28 August 2008	IRL	17	Keith Andrews	Midfielder	MK Dons	£1,000,000
12 September 2008	ENG	23	Robbie Fowler	Forward	Cardiff City	Free
	ENG	38	Mark Bunn	Goalkeeper	Northmapton Town	Undisclosed
15 January 2009	FRA	21	Gaël Givet	Defender	Marseille	Loan
	SEN	18	El Hadji Diouf	Winger	Sunderland	£2,000,000

=== Out ===
Date	Nationality	Player	Position	New club	Fee
	USA	Brad Friedel	Goalkeeper	Aston Villa	£2,000,000
	SUI	Bruno Berner	Full-back	Leicester City	Free
	SUI	Stéphane Henchoz	Defender	Retired	Free
	FIN	Peter Enckelman	Goalkeeper	Cardiff City	Free
31 July 2008	ENG	David Bentley	Winger	Tottenham Hotspur	£15,000,000
9 August 2008	NED	Maceo Rigters	Forward	Barnsley	Loan
	SCO	Paul Gallagher	Winger	Plymouth Argyle	Loan
	AUS	Rostyn Griffiths	Midfield	Accrington Stanley	Loan
23 December 2008	ENG	Robbie Fowler	Forward	N/A	Free
2 January 2009	IRL	Eddie Nolan	Defender	Preston North End	Undisclosed
	CAN	David Hoilett	Forward	FC St. Pauli	Loan
	GER	Sergio Peter	Winger	Sparta Prague	Undisclosed
	IRL	Alan Judge	Winger	Plymouth Argyle	Loan
28 January 2009	ENG	Matt Derbyshire	Forward	Olympiacos	Loan
	FAR	Gunnar Nielsen	Goalkeeper	Manchester City	Free

- Fees are an estimate

== Results ==
=== Pre-season ===
14 July 2008	Macclesfield Town	1–2	Blackburn Rovers
	Goal		Dunn; Gallagher

21 July 2008	1899 Hoffenheim	3–1	Blackburn Rovers
	Goal		McCarthy

25 July 2008	Benfica	2–3	Blackburn Rovers
	Goal		Pedersen; Roberts; Emerton

26 July 2008	Sporting CP	2–1	Blackburn Rovers
	Goal		McCarthy

2 August 2008	Wolverhampton Wanderers	4–2	Blackburn Rovers
	Goal		Derbyshire; Santa Cruz

9 August 2008	NAC Breda	1–1	Blackburn Rovers	Blackburn
	Goal		Roberts	Stadium: Ewood Park

=== Premier League ===
Round	1	2	3	4	5	6	7	8	9	10	11	12	13	14	15	16	17	18	19	20	21	22	23	24	25	26	27	28	29	30	31	32	33	34	35	36	37	38
Ground	A	H	A	H	H	A	H	A	H	A	A	H	H	A	A	H	A	H	A	H	H	H	A	A	H	A	A	H	A	H	H	A	A	H	A	H	A	H
Result	W	D	L	L	W	W	L	D	D	L	D	L	L	L	L	L	L	W	D	D	W	D	D	L	L	W	D	W	L	D	W	L	L	W	L	W	L	D

Updated to match(es) played on 28 December 2008. Source:
A = Away; H = Home; W = Win; D = Draw; L = Loss

16 August 2008	Everton	2–3	Blackburn Rovers	Liverpool
	Arteta 45'; Yakubu 64'	Report	Dunn 22'; Santa Cruz 66'; Ooijer 90'	Stadium: Goodison Park

23 August 2008	Blackburn Rovers	1–1	Hull City	Blackburn
	Roberts 38'		Garcia 40'	Stadium: Ewood Park

30 August 2008	West Ham United	4–1	Blackburn Rovers	London
	Davenport 12'; Samba 20' (o.g.); Bellamy 90'; Cole 90'	Report	Roberts 22'	Stadium: Upton Park

13 September 2008	Blackburn Rovers	0–4	Arsenal	Blackburn
15:00	Warnock (yellow card) 80'	Report	8' Van Persie; 45+1', 81' (pen.), 90+2' Adebayor; (yellow card) 60' Denílson	Stadium: Ewood Park

20 September 2008	Blackburn Rovers	1–0	Fulham	Blackburn
	Derbyshire 84'			Stadium: Ewood Park

27 September 2008	Newcastle	1–2	Blackburn Rovers	Newcastle upon Tyne
	Owen 51' (pen.)		Samba 31'; Santa Cruz 41'	Stadium: St James' Park

4 October 2008	Blackburn Rovers	0–2	Manchester United	Blackburn
			Brown 31'; Rooney 64'	Stadium: Ewood Park

18 October 2008	Bolton Wanderers	0–0	Blackburn Rovers	Horwich
				Stadium: Reebok Stadium

25 October 2008	Blackburn Rovers	1–1	Middlesbrough	Blackburn
	McCarthy 90'		Alves 74'	Stadium: Ewood Park

29 October 2008	Aston Villa	3–2	Blackburn Rovers	Birmingham
	Luke Young 45'; Barry 65'; Agbonlahor 87'		Warnock 30'; Emerton 90'	Stadium: Villa Park

1 November 2008	West Bromwich Albion	2–2	Blackburn Rovers	West Bromwich
	Bednář 55'; Miller 62'		McCarthy 13' (pen.); Andrews 89'	Stadium: The Hawthorns

8 November 2008	Blackburn Rovers	0–2	Chelsea	Blackburn
			Anelka 40', 68'	Stadium: Ewood Park

15 November 2008	Blackburn Rovers	1–2	Sunderland	Blackburn
	Samba 45'		Jones 49'; Cissé 71'	Stadium: Ewood Park

22 November 2008	Tottenham	1–0	Blackburn Rovers	London
	Pavlyuchenko 9'			Stadium: White Hart Lane

29 November 2008	Portsmouth	3–2	Blackburn Rovers	Portsmouth
	Crouch 49'; Defoe 53'; Davis 79'		Derbyshire 62'; Kerimoğlu 67'	Stadium: Fratton Park

6 December 2008	Blackburn Rovers	1–3	Liverpool	Blackburn
	Santa Cruz 86'		Alonso 69'; Benayoun 79'; Gerrard 90'	Stadium: Ewood Park

13 December 2008	Wigan Athletic	3–0	Blackburn Rovers	Wigan
	Heskey 10'; Valencia 12'; Cattermole 77'	Report		Stadium: DW Stadium

20 December 2008	Blackburn Rovers	3–0	Stoke City	Blackburn
	McCarthy 9', 27' (pen.); Roberts 18'			Stadium: Ewood Park

26 December 2008	Sunderland	0–0	Blackburn Rovers	Sunderland
				Stadium: Stadium of Light

28 December 2008	Blackburn Rovers	2–2	Manchester City	Blackburn
	McCarthy 45'; Roberts 84'		Sturridge 88'; Robinho 90'	Stadium: Ewood Park

17 January 2009	Blackburn Rovers	3–0	Newcastle United	Blackburn
	McCarthy 61' (pen.); Roberts 66', 86'			Stadium: Ewood Park

28 January 2009	Blackburn Rovers	2–2	Bolton Wanderers	Blackburn
	Warnock 66'; McCarthy 87'		Taylor 15'; K. Davies 35'	Stadium: Ewood Park

31 January 2009	Middlesbrough	0–0	Blackburn Rovers	Middlesbrough
				Stadium: Riverside Stadium

7 February 2009	Blackburn Rovers	0–2	Aston Villa	Blackburn
			Milner 27'; Agbonlahor 90'	Stadium: Ewood Park

21 February 2009	Manchester United	2–1	Blackburn Rovers	Manchester
	Rooney 23'; Ronaldo 60'		Santa Cruz 32'	Stadium: Old Trafford

1 March 2009	Hull City	1–2	Blackburn Rovers	Kingston upon Hull
	Ashbee 79'		Warnock 34'; Andrews 37'	Stadium: KC Stadium

4 March 2009	Blackburn Rovers	0–0	Everton	Blackburn
				Stadium: Ewood Park

11 March 2009	Fulham	1–2	Blackburn Rovers	London
	Dempsey 2'		Diouf 69'; Roberts 85'	Stadium: Craven Cottage

14 March 2009	Arsenal	4–0	Blackburn Rovers	London
	Ooijer 2' (o.g.); Arshavin 65'; Eboué 87', 90' (pen.)	Report		Stadium: Emirates Stadium

21 March 2009	Blackburn Rovers	1–1	West Ham United	Blackburn
	Andrews 51'		Noble 35'	Stadium: Ewood Park

4 April 2009	Blackburn Rovers	2–1	Tottenham	Blackburn
	McCarthy 82'; Ooijer 89'		Keane 30' (pen.)	Stadium: Ewood Park

11 April 2009	Liverpool	4–0	Blackburn Rovers	Liverpool
	Torres 5', 33'; Agger 83'; Ngog 90'			Stadium: Anfield

18 April 2009	Stoke City	1–0	Blackburn Rovers	Stoke-on-Trent
	Lawrence 75'			Stadium: Britannia Stadium

26 April 2009	Blackburn Rovers	2–0	Wigan Athletic	Blackburn
	McCarthy 45'; Nelsen 60'			Stadium: Ewood Park

2 May 2009	Manchester City	3–1	Blackburn Rovers	Manchester
	Caicedo 27'; Robinho 34'; Elano 45' (pen.)		Andrews 66'	Stadium: City of Manchester Stadium

9 May 2009	Blackburn Rovers	2–0	Portsmouth	Blackburn
	Pedersen 31'; McCarthy 58' (pen.)			Stadium: Ewood Park

16 May 2009	Chelsea	2–0	Blackburn Rovers	London
	Malouda 4'; Anelka 59'			Stadium: Stamford Bridge; Attendance: 40,804 (245 away)

24 May 2009	Blackburn Rovers	0–0	West Bromwich Albion	Blackburn
				Stadium: Ewood Park

=== FA Cup ===
5 January 2009	Blyth Spartans	0–1	Blackburn Rovers	Blyth, Northumberland
		Report	Villanueva	Stadium: Croft Park

24 January 2009	Sunderland	0–0	Blackburn Rovers	Sunderland
		Report		Stadium: Stadium of Light; Attendance: 22,634

5 February 2009	Blackburn Rovers	2–1 (aet)	Sunderland	Blackburn
	Mokoena 37'; McCarthy 118'	Report	Healy 7'	Stadium: Ewood Park; Attendance: 10,112

14 February 2009	Blackburn Rovers	2–2	Coventry City	Blackburn
	Santa Cruz 2'; Samba 90'	Report	Gunnarsson 61'; Doyle 76'	Stadium: Ewood Park; Attendance: 15,053

24 February 2009	Coventry City	1–0	Blackburn Rovers	Coventry
	Best 59'	Report		Stadium: Ricoh Arena; Attendance: 22,793

=== League Cup ===
27 August 2008	Blackburn Rovers	4–1	Grimsby Town	Blackburn
	Villanueva; Derbyshire; Emerton		Newey	Stadium: Ewood Park

24 September 2008	Blackburn Rovers	1–0	Everton	Blackburn
	Olsson			Stadium: Ewood Park

12 November 2008	Sunderland	1–2	Blackburn Rovers	Sunderland
	Jones 71'	Report	Santa Cruz 65'; Bardsley 70' (o.g.)	Stadium: Stadium of Light; Attendance: 18,555

3 December 2008	Manchester United	5–3	Blackburn Rovers	Manchester
	Tevez 35', 50' (pen.), 54', 90+4'; Nani 40'	Report	McCarthy 48', 90+2'; Derbyshire 84'	Stadium: Old Trafford; Attendance: 53,997

== Season statistics ==
		Player	Age	Position	Apps	Goals	Assists	Y. Cards	R. Cards
(England)	1	Paul Robinson	15 October 1979 (age 47)	Goalkeeper	39	0	0	0	0
(Netherlands)	2	André Ooijer	11 July 1974 (age 52)	Defender	34	2	2	9	0
(England)	3	Stephen Warnock	12 December 1981 (age 44)	Full Back	41	3	3	8	0
(Republic of the Congo)	4	Christopher Samba	28 March 1984 (age 42)	Defender	37	3	5	5	0
(Turkey)	5	Tugay Kerimoğlu	24 August 1970 (age 56)	Midfielder	34	1	0	3	0
(New Zealand)	6	Ryan Nelsen	18 October 1977 (age 49)	Defender	38	1	1	8	0
(Australia)	7	Brett Emerton	22 February 1979 (age 47)	Winger	22	2	3	4	0
(England)	8	David Dunn	27 December 1979 (age 46)	Midfielder	16	1	0	0	0
(Paraguay)	9	Roque Santa Cruz	16 August 1981 (age 45)	Forward	27	6	2	0	0
(South Africa)	10	Benni McCarthy	12 November 1977 (age 48)	Forward	31	13	4	5	1
(Australia)	11	Vince Grella	5 October 1979 (age 47)	Midfielder	17	0	0	4	0
(Norway)	12	Morten Gamst Pedersen	8 September 1981 (age 45)	Winger	35	1	9	2	1
(Georgia (country))	13	Zurab Khizanishvili	6 October 1981 (age 45)	Defender	11	0	0	4	0
(Switzerland)	14	Johann Vogel	8 March 1977 (age 49)	Midfielder	2	0	0	0	0
(South Africa)	15	Aaron Mokoena	25 November 1980 (age 45)	Midfielder	24	1	0	7	0
(Republic of Ireland)	16	Steven Reid	10 March 1981 (age 45)	Midfielder	4	0	2	0	0
(Republic of Ireland)	17	Keith Andrews	13 September 1980 (age 46)	Midfielder	33	4	0	5	0
(Scotland)	18	Paul Gallagher	9 August 1984 (age 42)	Winger	1	0	0	0	0
(Senegal)	18	El Hadji Diouf	15 January 1981 (age 45)	Winger	12	1	2	1	2
(Chile)	19	Carlos Villanueva	5 February 1986 (age 40)	Versatile	20	2	4	2	0
(Germany)	21	Sergio Peter	12 October 1986 (age 40)	Winger	0	0	0	0	0
(France)	21	Gaël Givet	9 October 1981 (age 45)	Defender	16	0	0	3	0
(England)	22	Danny Simpson	4 January 1987 (age 39)	Full Back	20	0	0	4	0
(England)	23	Robbie Fowler	9 April 1975 (age 51)	Forward	6	0	1	0	0
(Republic of Ireland)	24	Keith Treacy	13 September 1988 (age 38)	Winger	20	0	1	2	0
(Republic of Ireland)	25	Alan Judge	11 November 1988 (age 37)	Winger	2	0	0	0	0
(Paraguay)	26	Julio Santa Cruz	1 February 1990 (age 36)	Forward	0	0	0	0	0
(England)	27	Matt Derbyshire	14 April 1986 (age 40)	Forward	22	5	3	1	0
(Northern Ireland)	28	Tony Kane	29 August 1987 (age 39)	Full Back	0	0	0	0	0
(Sweden)	29	Martin Olsson	17 May 1988 (age 38)	Full Back	14	1	0	3	1
(Grenada)	30	Jason Roberts	25 January 1978 (age 48)	Forward	29	7	5	4	0
(England)	31	Bryan Hodge	23 September 1987 (age 39)	Midfielder	1	0	0	0	0
(Wales)	32	Jason Brown	18 May 1982 (age 44)	Goalkeeper	7	0	0	1	0
(England)	33	Frank Fielding	4 March 1988 (age 38)	Goalkeeper	0	0	0	0	0
(Faroe Islands)	34	Gunnar Nielsen	7 October 1986 (age 40)	Goalkeeper	0	0	0	0	0
(Republic of Ireland)	35	Eddie Nolan	5 August 1988 (age 38)	Defender	0	0	0	0	0
(England)	36	Marcus Marshall	7 October 1989 (age 37)	Forward	1	0	0	0	0
(England)	37	Alex Marrow	21 January 1990 (age 36)	Midfielder	0	0	0	0	0
(England)	38	Mark Bunn	19 November 1984 (age 41)	Goalkeeper	1	0	0	0	0
(Republic of Ireland)	39	Aaron Doran	13 May 1991 (age 35)	Winger	2	0	0	0	0
(Germany)	40	Björn Bussmann	18 March 1991 (age 35)	Goalkeeper	0	0	0	0	0
(England)	41	Andy Haworth	28 November 1988 (age 37)	Winger	2	0	0	0	0
(Republic of Ireland)	42	Gavin Gunning	28 January 1991 (age 35)	Defender	0	0	0	0	0
(England)	43	Jamie Clarke	11 September 1988 (age 38)	Forward	0	0	0	0	0

== Final league table ==
Pos	Team	Pld	W	D	L	GF	GA	GD	Pts
13	Bolton Wanderers	38	11	8	19	41	53	−12	41
14	Portsmouth	38	10	11	17	38	57	−19	41
15	Blackburn Rovers	38	10	11	17	40	60	−20	41
16	Sunderland	38	9	9	20	34	54	−20	36
17	Hull City	38	8	11	19	39	64	−25	35

Source: Barclays Premier League
Rules for classification: 1) points; 2) goal difference; 3) number of goals scored.
