= W. Mitchell =

English footballer

William Mitchell
Personal information
- Full name: William Mitchell
- Position: Forward

Senior career*
Years	Team	Apps	(Gls)
1888–1889	Blackburn Rovers	1	(2)
- * Club domestic league appearances and goals

William Mitchell was an English footballer who played in The Football League for Blackburn Rovers.

Mitchell was a one-game wonder. He came into the Blackburn Rovers team for their last game of the 1888–1889 season, a home match at Leamington Road, Blackburn against Derby County. Mitchell scored the only goal of the 1st-half and, from a free-kick he scored Blackburn's 3rd. So he assisted Blackburn achieve 66 goals in 22 League games the 2nd highest of the season. Despite having made such an impact in one game Mitchell never played again and nothing else is known about him.
