= Willie Almond =

English footballer

Personal information
- Full name: William Almond
- Date of birth: 5 April 1868
- Place of birth: Blackburn, England
- Date of death: 1942 (aged 73–74)
- Position: Half-back

Senior career*
Years	Team	Apps	(Gls)
1887–1888	Witton		
1888–1892	Blackburn Rovers	58	(3)
1892–1893	Accrington	9	(1)
1893–1894	Northwich Victoria	5	(0)
1893–1894	Middlesbrough		
1893–1894	Nelson		
1894–1895	Millwall Athletic		
1895–1897	Tottenham Hotspur	16	(2)
1897–1898	Millwall Athletic		
1897–1898	Wandsworth		
1899–1900	Clapton		
1900–1901	Wandsworth		
- * Club domestic league appearances and goals

William Almond (5 April 1868 – 1942), known as Willie Almond, was an English footballer who played in The Football League for Accrington, Blackburn Rovers, and Northwich Victoria.

In 1887 Almond signed with Witton, the year Witton FC recruited 19 professional footballers. Witton had its best run in both the FA Cup and the Lancashire Cup. What role Almond played in these cup runs is not recorded.

== Season 1888–1889 ==
Blackburn Rovers had a highly successful inaugural league season in 1888–1889. They finished 4th in the League and reached the semi-final of the FA Cup. Willie Almond made his League and Club debut, playing at centre-half, on 15 September 1888 at Leamington Road, home of Blackburn Rovers in a match against Accrington. The match was drawn 5-5. When he made his League debut Willie Almond was 20 years and 163 days old; that made him, on the second weekend of League football, Blackburn Rovers' youngest player. Almond scored his debut League goal on 10 November 1888 at Leamington Road, Blackburn, against Everton FC. Blackburn Rovers won the match 3–0. Almond missed only one of the 21 League matches played by Blackburn Rovers in 1888-1889 and scored one League goal. As a centre-half he played in a defence-line that kept three clean sheets and kept the opposition to one-in-a-match on three separate occasions. He also played one match as a wing-half.
