= Bernard Whittaker =

English footballer (1865–1957)

Personal information
- Full name: Bernard Whittaker
- Date of birth: 18 October 1865
- Place of birth: Blackburn, England
- Date of death: 1957 (aged 91–92)
- Position: Forward

Senior career*
Years	Team	Apps	(Gls)
1888–1889	Blackburn Rovers	4	(1)
- * Club domestic league appearances and goals

Bernard Whittaker (1865–1957) was an English footballer who played in The Football League for Blackburn Rovers.

== 1888-1889 ==
Bernard Whittaker made his debut for Rovers at Inside-Left on 12 January 1889. The venue was Leamington Road, Blackburn then home of Blackburn Rovers, and their opponents were 'The Invincibles' the great Preston North End. Rovers got themselves a draw despite being behind twice. Whittaker achieved an assist for the 2nd equaliser. Whittaker played 3 more League matches, all at Inside-Left, and scoring the only Rovers goal at Anfield, Liverpool, then home of Everton. Whittaker assisted Rovers score 66 goals in 22 games the 2nd highest of that season.
