= James Duerden =

English footballer

Personal information
- Place of birth: England
- Position: Full back

Senior career*
Years	Team	Apps	(Gls)
1887–88	Livesey	2	(0)
1888–90	Blackburn Rovers	2	(0)
1890–91	Burnley	3	(0)
- Rossendale United
- * Club domestic league appearances and goals

James Duerden was an English professional footballer who played as a full back.

== 1888–89 ==
Duerden played twice for Blackburn Rovers during the inaugural Football League season. His League debut was on 19 January 1889 at Thorneyholme Road, Accrington the home of Accrington. Duerden was selected to play outside-left and he assisted his team achieve a comfortable 2–0 win. Duerden returned to the team for the last match of the season. This was 15 April 1889, at Leamington Road, Blackburn, then home of Blackburn Rovers, and Duerden now played centre-half. Blackburn Rovers easily beat Derby County 3-0 and finished in 4th place.

He played three matches in the Football League for Blackburn Rovers and Burnley before moving to Rossendale United in 1891.
