= James Connor (English footballer) =

English footballer (1867–1929)

Personal information
- Full name: James Connor
- Date of birth: 1 April 1867
- Place of birth: Birmingham, England
- Date of death: 1929 (aged 63–64)
- Position: Half-back

Senior career*
Years	Team	Apps	(Gls)
1888–1889	Warwick County		
1889–1891	Aston Villa	4	(0)
1891–1893	King's Heath		
1893–1894	Nottingham Forest	5	(0)
1894	Heanor Town		
- * Club domestic league appearances and goals

James Connor (1867–1929) was an English footballer who played in the Football League for Aston Villa and Nottingham Forest.

== Early career ==
In 1888, Connor signed for Warwick County, an association football off-shoot of Warwickshire CCC. However, due to its proximity to the City of Birmingham the club could not compete with clubs like Aston Villa, for whom Connor signed in 1889.

== Football League career ==
Connor played one game in his first season at Wellington Road, the then home of Aston Villa, on 25 January 1890. Connor played left-half against Bolton Wanderers, a match which Villa lost 2–1. The Lancashire Evening Post described the match in its 25 January 1890 edition but did not mention Connor by name. The following season, Connor played three times in what was a poor Aston Villa season, the team finishing ninth in the League. His final appearance for the Villa first team was on Boxing Day 1890, at Wellington Road, against Sunderland. He returned to Birmingham to play for King's Heath, a club for which there are no online records. He played for the club for two years before moving to the East Midlands in 1893 when he signed for Nottingham Forest, a Football League First Division side.

Connor played five times in his first season as the team finished seventh in the First Division. His club debut was on 4 November 1893 against Burnley, but he got off to a losing start with a 3–1 defeat. His only appearance in a home game was on 24 March 1894 at the Town Ground against Preston North End. His final League appearance was on 26 March 1894 at Stoney Lane, the then home of West Bromwich Albion. Connor left Forest for Heanor Town in 1894.

== Later life ==
Connor died in 1929.

== Statistics ==
Appearances and goals by club, season and competition
Club	Season	League			FA Cup		Total	
Club	Season	Division	Apps	Goals	Apps	Goals	Apps	Goals
Aston Villa	1889–90	The Football League	1	0	-	-	1	0
Aston Villa	1890–91	Football League	3	0	-	-	3	0
Nottingham Forest	1893–94	First Division	5	0	-	-	5	0
