= Jack Graham (footballer, born 1868) =

English footballer

John Graham
Personal information
- Full name: Jack Richard Graham
- Date of birth: August 1868
- Place of birth: Smethwick, England
- Date of death: 1932 (aged 63–64)
- Place of death: West Bromwich
- Position: Forward

Youth career
- 1887–1888: Smethwick Centaur F.C.

Senior career*
Years	Team	Apps	(Gls)
1888–1890	Oldbury Broadwell F.C.		
1889–1893	Aston Villa	18	(5)
1893–1895	Brierley Hill Alliance		
1895–1897	Dudley Town		
- * Club domestic league appearances and goals

NOTE: There are differences over names of clubs between the sources. The main source used is Matthews.

John Richmond Graham, known as Jack Graham (born 1868 – died 1932) was an English footballer who played in the Football League for Aston Villa.

== Early career ==
Jack Graham first came to notice as a footballer when, aged 18/19 he signed, as a youth player, for a local Football Club called Smethwick Centaur F.C. (There are no online records about this club) After one season Graham signed for Oldbury Broadwell F.C.. It is possible (there are no records on this club) that Oldbury Broadwell were a Railway Works Club. There was the Oldbury Carriage & Wagon Co.Ltd. that built rolling stock for the Railways. The Works were on Broadwell Road. Jack Graham moved to Aston Villa in 1889.

== Season 1889–1890 ==
Jack Graham made his club and league debut and played his only first-team match of the season on 25 January 1890. The venue Wellington Road, the then home of Aston Villa. The visitors were Bolton Wanderers and Bolton won the match 2–1.

== Season 1890–1891 ==
1890–1891 was the most successful season for Jack Graham as a league player. Graham played 16 matches (out of 22) in what was a modest season for Aston Villa, finishing ninth. Graham played in the opening League match of the season. It was 6 September 1890 and the match was played at Molineux, the home of Wolverhampton Wanderers. Graham played at Inside Left and was on the losing side for a 2–1 defeat. Graham started at inside-left for Aston Villa' first home game of the season on 13 September 1890. He helped the team to achieve their first win of the campaign and Graham scored his first goal in the league and for the Villa first-team. The visitors were Notts County. The goal is briefly mentioned in the 13 September 1890 edition of the Nottingham Evening Post, page 3. Aston Villa led 2–1 at half-time. In one sentence the Nottingham Evening Post journalist wrote, "In the second half Graham scored a third goal for Aston Villa (3–1). Notts (County), retaliated, and gained a second point (goal)." Final score 3–2 to Aston Villa. That goal against Notts County was the first of five scored that season. His last league goal was scored on 10 January 1891 at Newcastle Road, the then home of Sunderland. Sunderland won 5–1 and Graham scored Villa' only goal. Graham' best performance for Villa, in terms of goal scoring, was when he scored two in a match. The occasion was an FA Cup First Round tie played at Wellington Road, Perry Barr on 17 January 1891 when the visitors were Casuals. Villa won 13–2 although this was not their record win. The Tony Matthews book confirms that 1890–1891 was Graham best season. Matthews describes Graham as, "an impish footballer". Matthews states that the success was achieved because of a left-sided partnership with Denny Hodgetts.

== Season 1891–1892 ==
Sadly, although 1891–1892 was a good season for Aston Villa, they finished fourth in The Football League and reached the Final of the FA Cup, Jack Graham was a reserve player and only played one first team match all season. Graham was moved to centre-forward for the visit to Ewood Park, Blackburn, on 5 March 1892. The match had seven goals and despite a Lewis Campbell hat-trick Aston Villa lost 4–3. It was Graham' last Villa and league appearance.

== 1893 onwards ==
Jack Graham stayed at Aston Villa for the 1892–1893 season but never played for the first-team. He left in the August of that year and signed for Brierley Hill Alliance. Graham was on the books of Brierley Hill Alliance for nearly two years but in May 1895 he moved to Dudley Town. Graham left Dudley Town in April 1897 aged 29. Whether he left for injury or to another club is not recorded in Matthews or online. Nothing further is known about Graham except he died in West Bromwich in 1932 aged 63 or 64.

== Statistics ==
Appearances and goals by club, season and competition
Club	Season	League			FA Cup		Total	
Club	Season	Division	Apps	Goals	Apps	Goals	Apps	Goals
Aston Villa	1889–90	The Football League	1	0	-	-	1	0
Aston Villa	1890–91	Football League	16	5	2	2	18	7
Aston Villa	1891–92	Football League	1	0	0	0	1	0
