= Thomas Clarkson (footballer) =

English footballer

Personal information
- Full name: Thomas Clarkson
- Date of birth: April 1865
- Place of birth: Stourbridge, England
- Date of death: 1915 (aged 49–50)
- Position: Wing half

Senior career*
Years	Team	Apps	(Gls)
1887	Stourbridge Invicta		
1888	Halesowen		
1889–1892	Aston Villa	17	(0)
1893	Oldbury Town		
- * Club domestic league appearances and goals

Thomas Clarkson (April 1865 – 1915) was an English footballer who played in the Football League for Aston Villa.

Clarkson made his Villa debut in the 1889–90 season.
