= Robert Haresnape =

English footballer

Personal information
- Date of birth: 14 July 1866
- Place of birth: Blackburn, England
- Date of death: 1951 (aged 84–85)
- Place of death: Blackburn, England
- Position: Winger

Senior career*
Years	Team	Apps	(Gls)
1884–1886	Witton		
1886–1887	Darwen		
1887–1888	Witton		
1888–1889	Blackburn Rovers	9	(2)
1889–1892	Burnley	26	(8)
1891–1892	Burnley Swifts F.C.		
1891–1893	Irwell Springs		
1893–1894	Rossendale		
1894–????	Stockport County		
- * Club domestic league appearances and goals

Robert Haresnape (14 July 1866 – 1951) was an English professional association footballer who played as a winger. He died in his home town of Blackburn, Lancashire in 1951.

Robert Haresnape was born on 14 July 1866 in Blackburn, Lancashire. Haresnape' first club was Witton which he signed for in 1884. He stayed at Witton for two years and then moved to Darwen in 1886, returning to Witton in 1887. The following year Haresnape signed for Blackburn Rovers.

== Season 1888-89 ==
Robert Haresnape, playing as a winger, made his League debut on 22 September 1888 at Leamington Road, the then home of Blackburn Rovers. The visitors were West Bromwich Albion and the home team won by 6–2. Robert Haresnape, playing as a winger, scored his debut League goal on 20 October 1888 at Leamington Road. The visitors were Wolverhampton Wanderers and Robert Haresnape scored the second Blackburn Rovers goal to make the final score 2–2. Robert Haresnape appeared in nine of the 22 League matches played by Blackburn Rovers during the 1888–89 season and scored two League goals. As a winger (eight appearances) he played in a midfield that achieved a big (three–League–goals–or–more) win twice. Robert Haresnape did well in the 1888—89 FA Cup run where in addition to scoring a hat—trick against Aston Villa in an 8–1 win he scored three times in three appearances. He played both semi—final matches against Wolverhampton Wanderers.

He joined Burnley the following season and played for them for three seasons 1889–1892. He made 28 appearances (26 League + 2 FA Cup) and eight League goals. In 1891 Haresnape played for three different teams, Burnley, Burnley Swifts F.C. and Irwell Springs. After two years at Irwell Springs Haresnape moved to Rossendale in 1893 and then, one year later, his final club, Stockport County.
