= John Russell (Cambuslang footballer) =

Scottish footballer

Personal information
- Position: Right half

Senior career*
Years	Team	Apps	(Gls)
- Cambuslang

International career
1890	Scotland	1	(0)
- * Club domestic league appearances and goals

John Russell was a Scottish footballer who played as a right half.

== Career ==
Russell played club football for Cambuslang, and made one appearance for Scotland in 1890.
