= Richard Hunter (footballer) =

Scottish footballer

Personal information
- Full name: Richard Dunn Hunter
- Date of birth: 16 March 1865
- Place of birth: Rhu, Scotland
- Date of death: 10 September 1910 (aged 45)
- Place of death: Liverpool, England
- Position: Right back

Senior career*
Years	Team	Apps	(Gls)
1881–1897	Yoker		
1884	→ Burnley (trial)		
1887–1892	St Mirren	13	(0)

International career
1890	Scotland	1	(0)
- * Club domestic league appearances and goals

Richard Dunn Hunter (16 March 1865 – 10 September 1910) was a Scottish footballer who played as a right back.

== Career ==
Hunter played club football for Yoker, St Mirren and Burnley, and made one appearance for Scotland in 1890, in addition to respresenting Renfrewshire on several occasions.
