= Rowland Pennington =

English footballer

Personal information
- Date of birth: 1870
- Place of birth: St Helens, Merseyside, England
- Date of death: 1929 (aged 58–59)
- Position: Goalkeeper

Senior career*
Years	Team	Apps	(Gls)
- St. Helens
- Whiston
1890–1892	Blackburn Rovers	8	(0)
1892	Northwich Victoria	4	(0)
Total		12	(0)
- * Club domestic league appearances and goals

Rowland Pennington (1870 – 1929) was an English footballer who played in the Football League for Blackburn Rovers and Northwich Victoria.
