= David Morral Lewis =

Welsh footballer

David Lewis
Personal information
- Full name: David Morral Lewis
- Date of birth: 1864
- Place of birth: Wales
- Date of death: 1925 (aged 60–61)

Senior career*
Years	Team	Apps	(Gls)
- Bangor

International career
1890	Wales	2	(1)
- * Club domestic league appearances and goals

David Morral Lewis (1864–1925) was a Welsh international footballer. He was part of the Wales national football team, playing 2 matches and scoring 1 goal. He played his first match on 8 February 1890 against Ireland and his last match on 22 March 1890 against Scotland . At club level, he played for Bangor

== See also ==
- List of Wales international footballers (alphabetical)
