= Sandy Ferguson (footballer) =

Scottish footballer

Personal information
- Date of birth: 1867
- Place of birth: Glasgow, Scotland
- Date of death: 1894 (aged 26–27)
- Position: Half back

Senior career*
Years	Team	Apps	(Gls)
- Rangers
1889–1890	Notts County	22	(0)
- * Club domestic league appearances and goals

Sandy Ferguson (1867–1894) was a Scottish footballer who played in the Football League for Notts County.
