= William Holden (footballer) =

English footballer

Personal information
- Full name: William Holden
- Date of birth: 1860
- Place of birth: Darwen, England
- Position: Goalkeeper

Senior career*
Years	Team	Apps	(Gls)
1888	Darwen		
1888–1889	Blackburn Rovers	1	(0)
1889	Darwen		
- * Club domestic league appearances and goals

William Holden (born 1860) was an English footballer who played in The Football League for Blackburn Rovers.

== 1888-1889 ==
In late December 1888 Blackburn Rovers had a goalkeeping crisis so Rovers approached Darwen and borrowed William Holden. His only League game could not have been more difficult. He was in goal on 29 December 1888 as Rovers travelled to Deepdale, home of "The Invincibles", Preston North End. Holden played really well as reported by the journalists of the day and had a clean sheet at half-time. In the end, in a tight game Preston were the more dangerous team and their star forward, John Goodall got the only goal of the game. Holden returned to Darwen early in the New Year, 1889.
