= Edmund Currey =

English footballer

Personal information
- Full name: Edmund Samuel Currey
- Date of birth: 28 June 1868
- Place of birth: Lewes, England
- Position: Inside forward

Senior career*
Years	Team	Apps	(Gls)
- Oxford University

International career
1890	England	2	(2)
- * Club domestic league appearances and goals

Edmund Samuel Currey (born 28 June 1868) was an English footballer who earned two caps for the national team in 1890, scoring two goals. Currey played club football for Oxford University.
