= Harry Fecitt =

English footballer

Personal information
- Full name: Herbert Lincoln Fecitt
- Date of birth: 18 December 1864
- Place of birth: Blackburn, England
- Date of death: 1946 (aged 80–81)
- Position: Forward

Senior career*
Years	Team	Apps	(Gls)
1881–1882	King's Own F.C.		
1882–1887	Blackburn Rovers		
1887–1888	Accrington		
1888–1891	Blackburn Rovers	21	(13)
1892–1893	Northwich Victoria	13	(7)
Total		34	(20)
- * Club domestic league appearances and goals

Herbert Lincoln "Harry" Fecitt (1864–1946) was an English footballer of the Victorian era. Born in Blackburn, he played for the Blackburn club King's Own F.C. from 1881 to 1882. He then joined Blackburn Rovers in 1882 for his first spell at the club. Fecitt scored on his debut (1884) 4 goals when Blackburn Rovers thrashed Rossendale 11–0 in a FA Cup 1st Round tie. Rovers got to the Final in 1885 and their opponents were (Queen's Park Glasgow). Fecitt was part of that team and Rovers won the match 2–0. He also played in the Rovers Cup winning side of 1886. In 1887 Fecitt left Rovers and played for Accrington FC for one season (1887-1888).

== Season 1888-1889 ==
Harry Fecitt rejoined Blackburn Rovers in 1888 and then made his League debut on 15 September 1888, playing as a forward against Accrington at Leamington Road, then home of Blackburn Rovers. The match ended in a 5–5 draw and Harry Fecitt scored his debut League goal, Blackburn Rovers' fifth goal. in season 1888–89, Harry Fecitt played 17 League matches and scored 12 goals. As a forward he played in a forward-line that scored three-League-goals-or-more-in-a-match on nine separate occasions. In scoring 12 League goals Fecitt scored two-in-a-match three times. Harry Fecitt played in the two FA Cup semi-final matches against Wolverhampton Wanderers (the first match ended 1-1). Blackburn Rovers lost the replay 3–1.

That season although he was one of the top scorers (a shared ninth, with 12 goals in 17 matches, i.e. 0.71 goals per match) during the Football League's first season, it is said that he "was unable to gain a regular place in the side" and moved to play with Northwich Victoria F.C. the following season. However, with only 13 games in his new club he retired from football.
