= James Thraves =

English footballer

Personal information
- Date of birth: 1869
- Place of birth: Normanton, England
- Date of death: 1936 (aged 66–67)
- Position: Goalkeeper

Senior career*
Years	Team	Apps	(Gls)
- Notts St John's
1890–1892	Notts County	4	(0)
1894–1897	Leicester Fosse	80	(0)
- Long Eaton Rangers
- * Club domestic league appearances and goals

James Thraves (1869–1936) was an English footballer who played in the Football League for Leicester Fosse and Notts County.
