= James Beresford (footballer, born 1860) =

English footballer

Personal information
- Date of birth: Quarter 1 1860
- Place of birth: Staveley
- Date of death: 1903
- Position: Outside right

Senior career*
Years	Team	Apps	(Gls)
1882–1883	Staveley		
1883–1884	Church F.C.		
1883–1887	Accrington		
1887–1889	Blackburn Rovers	12	(4)
1889	Hyde		
- * Club domestic league appearances and goals

James Beresford was a footballer who played in the Football League for Blackburn Rovers.

== Playing career ==
In 1882 Beresford signed for his home town club Staveley. He then moved North and joined an Accrington Football Club called Church F.C. During the 1883–84 season he moved to Accrington and caused them to be expelled from the FA Cup after playing for Accrington in a Cup tie against Rossendale. Accrington won 5–1 and Beresford scored twice. Beresford returned to Church F.C. but was paid to remain on the books of Accrington. The FA find out and charged Accrington with breaking the rules and expelling them from the FA Cup.

James Beresford made his League debut on 15 September 1888, as a winger, at Leamington Road, then home of Blackburn Rovers, against Accrington. The match ended in a 5–5 draw and, Beresford scored his League debut goal by scoring Blackburn Rovers second goal. Beresford played 12, of the 22 League matches played by Blackburn Rovers in season 1888–89 and scored four League goals. As a winger he played in a midfield that achieved big (three-League-goals-or-more) wins on three separate occasions.
