= John Barton (footballer, born 1866) =

English footballer

Personal information
- Date of birth: 5 October 1866
- Place of birth: Blackburn, England
- Date of death: 22 April 1910 (aged 43)
- Place of death: Blackburn, England
- Position: Full-back

Senior career*
Years	Team	Apps	(Gls)
1885–1886	Witton		
1886–1887	Blackburn West End		
1887–1892	Blackburn Rovers	40	(2)

International career
1890	England	1	(1)
- * Club domestic league appearances and goals

John Barton, known as Jack Barton, (5 October 1866 – 22 April 1910) was an English footballer. He played at international level once for England while on the books of Blackburn Rovers.

A native of Blackburn, Jack Barton started out, like many at Rovers, in the ranks of local junior organisation Kings's Own. Following a spell at local club Witton alongside Nat Walton and Blackburn West End F.C., he joined Rovers and made his debut in a 5—1 beating of local rivals Blackburn Olympic in round two of the 1887-88 FA Cup. NOTE: Another source stated that Barton signed and played for Blackburn West End F.C. from 1886 until he signed for Rovers.

Jack Barton, playing as a wing—half, made his League debut on 29 September 1888 at Dudley Road, the then home of Wolverhampton Wanderers. Blackburn Rovers drew 2–2 with the home team. Jack Barton appeared in five of the 22 League matches played by Blackburn Rovers in season 1888–89. Playing as a wing—half (five appearances), Jack Barton was part of Blackburn Rovers midfield that achieved a big (one—League—goal—or—more) win once. Jack Barton appeared in one 1888-89 FA Cup tie and scored in a 5–0 win for the Rovers.

John Barton was very involved in the 1889-90 Football League campaign (Blackburn Rovers finished third in the League) playing in 15 matches, scoring once) and appeared three times in 1889-90 FA Cup, scoring once and playing in the Final which Rovers won 6–1 over The Wednesday thereby gaining his first of two Winner's medals. Also in season 1889—90 Barton won his only international cap for England in a game against Ireland on 15 March 1890. Barton scored one of the goals in England's 9–1 victory.

In season 1890–91 Barton appeared in 18 League matches (Rovers finished sixth), scoring once and played in all six FA Cup ties, including the Final where Rovers defeated Notts County 3–1 and Barton won his second Winner's Medal.

In the first game of the 1891-92 Football League season Barton was injured and did not return until the game against Stoke in November 1891, by which time Geordie Anderson had been recruited to replace him. He suffered another injury which ended his football career after playing 40 league games for Rovers. From 1888 until he retired in 1891 Jack Barton played 50 times for Rovers, 40 Football League and ten FA Cup. He scored four goals (two each in League and FA Cup). Jack Barton died on 22 April 1910 aged 43.

== Honours ==
Blackburn Rovers

- FA Cup winner: 1890 and 1891
