= William Townley =

English football player and manager

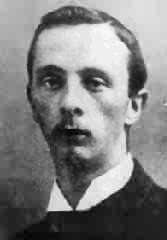
- Townley in his earlier years

Personal information
- Date of birth: 14 February 1866
- Place of birth: Blackburn, England
- Date of death: 30 May 1950 (aged 84)
- Place of death: Blackpool, England
- Height: 5 ft 10 in (1.78 m)
- Position: Left winger

Senior career*
| Years | Team | Apps | (Gls) |
| 1882–1883 | Blackburn Swifts | | |
| 1883–1886 | Blackburn Olympic | | |
| 1886–1892 | Blackburn Rovers | 77 | (27) |
| 1892–1893 | Stockton | | |
| 1893–1894 | Blackburn Rovers | 20 | (10) |
| 1894–1896 | Darwen | 42 | (15) |
| 1896–1897 | Manchester City | 3 | (0) |

International career
| 1889–1890 | England | 2 | (2) |

Managerial career
- –1909: Deutscher FC Prag
- 1909–1911: Karlsruher FV
- 1911–1913: SpVgg Fürth
- 1914: Bayern Munich
- 1914: SpVgg Fürth
- 1914: Bayern Munich
- 1919–1921: Bayern Munich
- 1920: St. Gallen
- 1921: Waldhof Mannheim
- –1923: SC Victoria Hamburg
- 1923–1925: St. Gallen
- 1924: Netherlands
- 1926–1927: SpVgg Fürth
- FSV Frankfurt
- 1930–1932: SpVgg Fürth
- 1932: Eintracht Hannover
- Arminia Hannover
- * Club domestic league appearances and goals

William James Townley (14 February 1866 – 30 May 1950) was an English football player and coach.

He scored the first hat-trick in the history of the FA Cup final, and he is considered an important pioneer of the game in Germany, leading Karlsruher FV and SpVgg Fürth to three German championships as a coach.

== Playing career ==
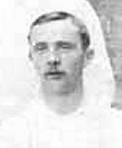
Townley in 1890

Townley's career as a player began with Blackburn Swifts F.C., where he played for one season. He then joined Blackburn Olympic for two seasons. His playing position at Swifts and Olympic was centre-forward. He joined Blackburn Rovers in 1886 and switched to the left winger position. Townley's technique to deter defending full-backs was to throw his arms up in the air, thus startling his opponent; Townley then swept past to make an attack. On 15 September 1888, Townley, playing as a winger, made his league debut at Leamington Road, then home of Blackburn Rovers, against Accrington. The match ended as a 5–5 draw, with Townley scoring the second and fourth goals for Blackburn Rovers, and becoming the team's top scorer temporarily.

== Season 1888-1889 ==
In the 1888–89 season, Townley played 19 league matches and scored eight league goals. As a winger, he played in a midfield that achieved big (three league goals or more) league wins on five occasions. In scoring eight league goals, Townley scored two-in-a-match twice. He played in all five FA Cup ties played by Blackburn Rovers in 1888–1889 at Outside-Left; he scored twice. He scored one of Blackburn' five goals on 9 February 1889, in a 5–0 win over Accrington. The match was a First Round Replay (The match at Thorneyholme Road, Accrington was drawn 1-1). He also scored Blackburn's only goal in another replay. It was 23 March 1889 and the venue was the Alexandra Recreation Ground in Crewe. On 16 March 1889, at the same venue, Blackburn drew 1–1 with Wolverhampton Wanderers, so the match was replayed one week later. Blackburn lost 3-1 and Townley scored Blackburn's goal. He assisted Blackburn to win the FA Cup with the club in 1890 and 1891. In the first of these title appearances against The Wednesday, the outside left made history by contributing three goals in a 6–1 victory, earning the distinction of becoming the first player to score a hat-trick in an FA Cup final. He scored another goal in the successful defence of the title, as the Rovers overcame Notts County 3–1 the following year. Townley's total of four goals in FA Cup finals has to date only been bettered once, by Liverpool's Ian Rush, who scored five goals in three finals appearances in the 1980s.

Townley was capped twice for England, in 1889 and 1890, scoring two goals in the second of those matches, which was a 9–1 victory over Ireland. In 1894, he moved to Darwen and played there for six years before joining Manchester City, where his playing career ended after he suffered a serious head injury.

== Coaching career ==
At the end of his playing years, Townley took up coaching as a profession; as the opportunities were limited in England, he left for the continent, where football was beginning to develop a serious following. In Germany, as in the rest of Europe at the time, the game was strictly amateur in character, and players often had to contribute to team expenses. For a club to have a coach was not yet a matter of course, but rather a luxury, as it was more common then for a senior player or club functionary to fill the role and carry out the tasks of a coach. Coaches were often hired for special occasions only, or for a brief period to help develop the skills of a team, before they moved on.

Townley's first coaching job was with DFC Prague, who were beaten by VfB Leipzig in Germany's first national championship staged in 1903. He later joined Karlsruher FV, losing finalists in 1905, and led them to a their only national title in 1910.

The following year, he was hired by the northern Bavarian club SpVgg Fürth. This club owned the most advanced facilities in Germany, and was quickly becoming the largest club in the country with a membership approaching 3,000. Two months after his arrival, Fürth lost against English side Newcastle United 2–1. He guided the club to its first two Bavarian championships (Ostkreismeisterschaft), which heralded the onset of a golden era that would last into the 1930s, and which saw the club become one of the most dominant football sides in the country.

In December 1913, Townley got the call from Bayern Munich, but on a loan arrangement he re-joined Fürth in April of the following year to guide them through the national championship rounds. In the final, Fürth captured its first national title, defeating defending champions VfB Leipzig, holders of a then record three German titles. It is not clear, but he may then have returned to Munich, before the horrors of World War I overtook the continent, obscuring knowledge of Townley's activities during this period.

He re-emerged with Bayern in 1919 and coached there until 1921, helping the club earn local and regional titles. It appears he was loaned to the Swiss club FC St. Gallen in August 1920 for what was probably a summer training camp. Townley's two tenures in Munich coincided with the first two terms of legendary Bayern President Kurt Landauer, who oversaw the club's first national title victory in 1932 during his third term with the Austrian Richard Dombi – of later Feyenoord fame – as coach.

Afterward, Townley moved to SV Waldhof Mannheim, where he spent two months aiding in the club's preparations for the South German Championship. The team's campaign was cut short by eventual national champions 1. FC Nürnberg. It then appears that he may have coached in Sweden, before joining SC Victoria Hamburg where he and his son, playing as a striker, spent a couple of seasons. The last months of the 1922–23 season, he trained both Be Quick 1887 and Forward from the Dutch town of Groningen. In the latter of half of 1923, Townley returned to St. Gallen, where he stayed until February 1925.

Townley interrupted his time in Switzerland for a four-month stint with the Netherlands national team to guide them through the 1924 Olympics in Paris. In the semi-finals, the Netherlands lost a closely fought match to Uruguay – the dominant side of that era, who counted the legendary Andrade and Pedro Cea in their ranks – and had to settle for fourth place.

In May 1926, Townley rejoined SpVgg Fürth for the championship final in which they overcame Hertha BSC to win their second national title – the third national title to his credit. A year later, he was coaching 1925 finalists FSV Frankfurt, and spent some time working with nearby Union Niederrad.

In 1930, Townley returned for a third time to Fürth, with the club winning the South German Championship, before being ousted from the national playoffs in the quarter-finals by the defending champions Hertha Berlin.

Now in his mid-60s, Townley took up his last known posting in 1932 with Arminia Hannover, then a strong regional side. Arminia defeated Dresdner SC in a quarter-final match, but lost in the next round at home to eventual champions Fortuna Düsseldorf, starring the legendary Paul Janes. This marks the zenith of Arminia's achievement and the last significant role of a great pioneer of the game in Germany.

Townley died in Blackpool, England in 1950 at the age of 84.

== Honours and achievements ==
=== Playing career ===
| Year | Club | Year | Title |
|---|---|---|---|
| 18?? | Blackburn Junior Football | | |
| 18?? | Blackburn Olympic F.C. | | |
| 1886 | Blackburn Rovers | 1890; 1891 | FA Cup; FA Cup |
| 1894 | Darwen F.C. | | |
| 1900 | Manchester City | | |

England national team

23 February 1889 – British Home Championship – Stoke: England – Wales 4–1
15 March 1890 – British Home Championship – Belfast: Ireland – England 1–9 (2 goals by Townley)

=== Coaching career ===
| Years | Club | Details | Year | Titles |
|---|---|---|---|---|
| 19??–1909 | Deutscher FC Prag | | | |
| 1909–1911 | Karlsruher FV | | 1910 | Championship |
| 1911–1913 | SpVgg Fürth | 04/1911 – 12/1913 | 1912; 1913 | Bavarian Championship; Bavarian Championship |
| 1914 | Bayern Munich | 01/1914 – 04/1914 | | |
| 1914 | SpVgg Fürth | 04/1914 – 05/1914 | 1914 | Championship |
| 1914 | Bayern Munich | | | |
| 1919–1921 | Bayern Munich | | 1920 | Champion Munich, Champion Southern Bavaria |
| 1920 | St. Gallen (CH) | 08/1920 | | |
| 1921 | Waldhof Mannheim | 01/1921 – 03/1921 | | |
| 192?–1923 | SC Victoria Hamburg | | | |
| 1923–1925 | St. Gallen (CH) | 1923 – 02/1925 | | |
| 1924 | Netherlands (National) | 03/1924-06/1924 | 1924 | Olympics, 4th place |
| 1926–1927 | SpVgg Fürth | 05/1926 – 09/1927 | 1926; 1927 | Championship; South German Cup |
| 192?–19?? | FSV Frankfurt | | | |
| 1930–1932 | SpVgg Fürth | 09/30 – 06/1932 | 1931 | Champion South Germany |
| 1932 (?) | Eintracht Hannover | | | |
| 1932-193x | Arminia Hannover | | 1933 | Champion North Germany (Southern District) |

Not verified engagements:

- Sweden
- FC Union Niederrad 07 (ca. 1927/1930)
