= Leamington Road =

Football ground in Blackburn, England

- Former location in Blackburn
- Location: Blackburn, England
- Coordinates: 53.7536°N 2.5042°W
- Surface: Grass

Construction
- Opened: 1881
- Closed: 1890

Tenant
- Blackburn Rovers

Leamington Road was a football ground in Blackburn in England. It was the home ground of Blackburn Rovers between 1881 and 1890.

== History ==
Blackburn Rovers moved to Leamington Road from their Alexandra Meadows ground in 1881. As the ground developed, a 600-seat stand was built on the north-eastern touchline and a pavilion constructed in the eastern corner of the ground. The perimeter of the pitch was surrounded with duckboards.

England played two internationals at Leamington Road, drawing with Wales in 1885 and losing to Scotland in 1887. In 1888 Blackburn became members of the English Football League, and the first Football League game played at Leamington Road on 15 September 1888 saw Blackburn draw 5–5 with local rivals Accrington in front of 5,000 spectators.

The highest League attendance recorded at Leamington Road was 15,000 for a match against Preston North End on 2 November 1889. The club moved to Ewood Park in 1890, with the last League match played at Leamington Road on 4 January when Blackburn beat Stoke 8–0. The site was developed for housing shortly afterwards.
