= 1885–86 British Home Championship =

Tournament details
- Host country: England, Ireland, Scotland and Wales
- Dates: 27 February – 10 April 1886
- Teams: 4

Final positions
- Champions: Scotland; England (shared)

Tournament statistics
- Matches played: 6
- Goals scored: 32 (5.33 per match)
- Top scorer(s): (Scotland) Charles Heggie (England) Benjamin Spilsbury (4 goals)

The 1885–86 British Home Championship was the third edition of the British Home Championship annual international football tournament played between the British Home Nations. As common for the time, the matches were punctuated by some high scorelines and for the first time two teams finished level on points at the top of the table, thus sharing the championship; goal difference would not be introduced to separate teams for over nearly 90 years.

England and Scotland were the joint winners, with Wales third and Ireland last with zero points. The tournament began in February 1886 with a match between Wales and Ireland which Wales won comfortably 5–0. Ireland next played against England and Scotland, suffering two heavy defeats in which they conceded 13 goals for three in reply. With the three leaders therefore equal on points, England and Scotland played their match, sharing points in a 1–1 draw. Wales then played against England and Scotland in the final games but lost both, resulting in England and Scotland sharing the title.

== Table ==
Pos	Team	Pld	W	D	L	GF	GA	GD	Pts
1	Scotland (C)	3	2	1	0	12	4	+8	5
2	England (C)	3	2	1	0	10	3	+7	5
3	Wales	3	1	0	2	7	7	0	2
4	Ireland	3	0	0	3	3	18	−15	0

Rules for classification: 1) Points. The points system worked as follows: 2 points for a win and 1 point for a draw.
(C) Joint champions

== Results ==
27 February 1886

Wales	5–0	Ireland
Roberts; Wilding; Hersee; Bryan; Sisson

Racecourse Ground, Wrexham
Attendance: 700
Referee: Dick Gregson (England)

13 March 1886

Ireland	1–6	England
Williams		Spilsbury; Lindley; Dewhurst

Ulster Cricket Ground, Belfast
Attendance: 4,500
Referee: James McKillop (Scotland)

20 March 1886

Ireland	2–7	Scotland
John Condy 19'; Samuel Johnston 44'		Heggie 15', 18', 25', 60'; James Kelly 35'; Dunbar 40'; Gourlay 75'

Ulster Cricket Ground, Belfast
Attendance: 3,000
Referee: George T. Wolstenholme (Ireland)

27 March 1886

Scotland	1–1	England
Somerville 80'		Lindley 35'

Hampden Park, Glasgow
Attendance: 11,000
Referee: Alexander Hunter (Wales)

29 March 1886

Wales	1–3	England
Lewis		Brann; Dewhurst; Amos

Racecourse Ground, Wrexham
Attendance: 5,000
Referee: Stuart Lawrie (Scotland)

10 April 1886

Scotland	4–1	Wales
McCormick 30'; McCall 47'; Allan 53'; Harrower 56'		Vaughan 88'

Hampden Park, Glasgow
Attendance: 5,500
Referee: John Sinclair (Ireland)

== Winning squads ==
- England

Name	Apps/Goals by opponent			Total	
Name	(Wales) WAL	(Ireland) IRE	(Scotland) SCO	Apps	Goals
Tinsley Lindley	1	1/1	1/1	3	2
Ralph Squire	1	1	1	3	0
Percy Walters	1	1	1	3	0
Benjamin Spilsbury		1/4	1	2	4
Fred Dewhurst	1/1	1/1		2	2
George Brann	1/1		1	2	1
Herby Arthur	1		1	2	0
Norman Bailey	1		1	2	0
Charles Bambridge	1		1	2	0
Nevill Cobbold	1		1	2	0
Jimmy Forrest	1		1	2	0
Andrew Amos	1/1			1	1
Arthur Walters			1	1	0
Richard Baugh		1		1	0
Charles Dobson		1		1	0
John Leighton		1		1	0
Thelwell Pike		1		1	0
William Rose		1		1	0
George Shutt		1		1	0

- Scotland

Name	Apps/Goals by opponent			Total	
Name	(Wales) WAL	(Ireland) IRE	(England) ENG	Apps	Goals
Charles Heggie		1/1		1	4
George Somerville			1	1	1
Michael Dunbar		1/1		1	1
James Gourlay		1/1		1	1
James Kelly		1/1		1	1
David Allan	1/1			1	1
William Harrower	1/1			1	1
James McCall	1/1			1	1
Bob McCormick	1/1			1	1
Ralph Aitken			1	1	0
Walter Arnott			1	1	0
Charles Campbell			1	1	0
Woodville Gray			1	1	0
Alexander Hamilton			1	1	0
Joe Lindsay			1	1	0
James McAulay			1	1	0
John Macdonald			1	1	0
Michael Paton			1	1	0
William Sellar			1	1	0
John Cameron		1		1	0
James Connor		1		1	0
Robert Fleming		1		1	0
Leitch Keir		1		1	0
William McLeod		1		1	0
Andrew Thomson		1		1	0
Willie Turner		1		1	0
George Gillespie	1			1	0
Andrew Jackson	1			1	0
Bob Kelso	1			1	0
James Lundie	1			1	0
John Marshall	1			1	0
James McGhee	1			1	0
William Semple	1			1	0
