= 1885–86 in English football =

Football in England
- Season: 1885–86

Men's football
- FA Cup: Blackburn Rovers

The 1885–86 season was the 15th season of competitive football in England.

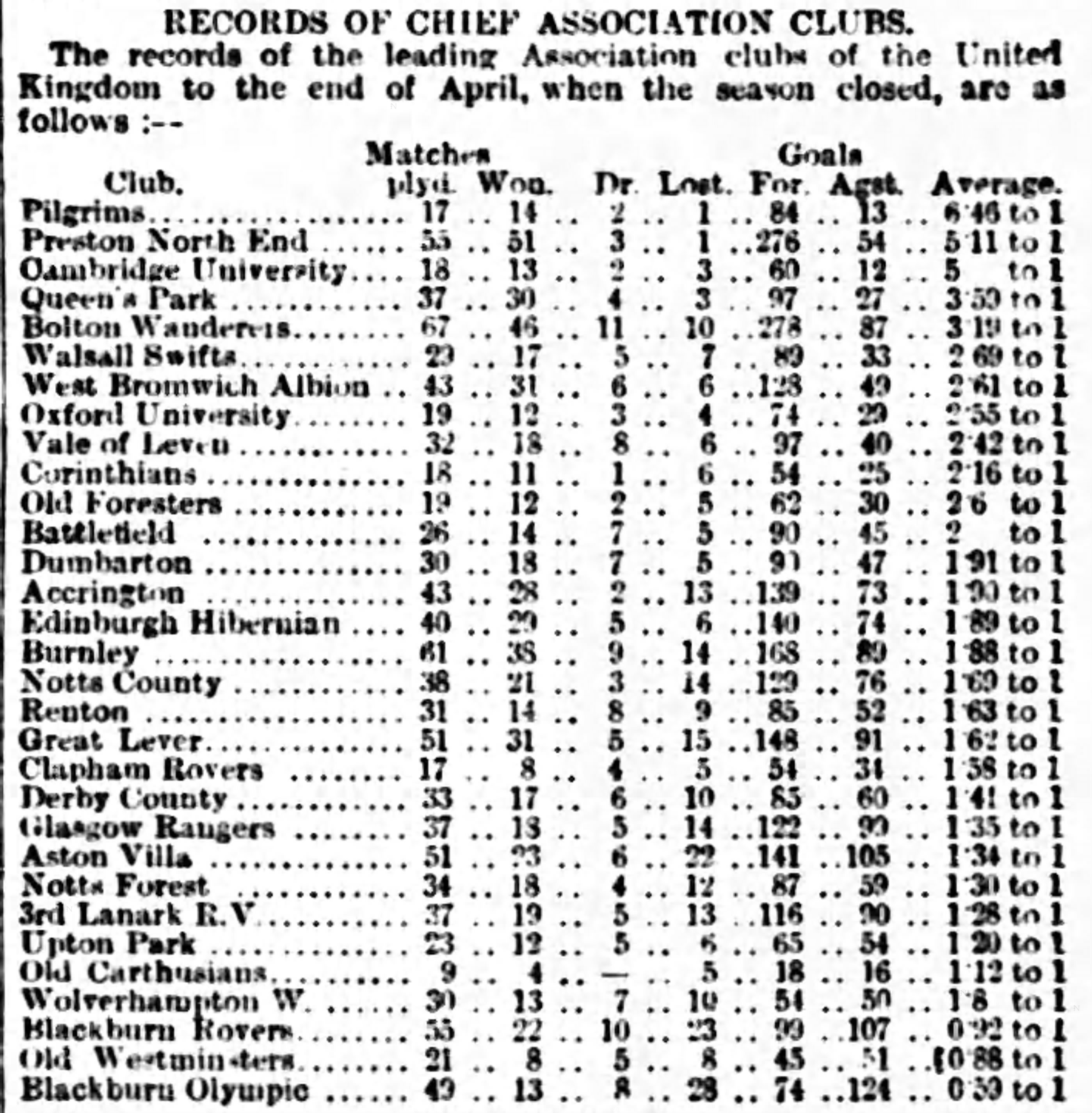
An early form of football league table, showing the leading clubs ranked by goal average, Newcastle Daily Chronicle, 13 May 1886

== National team ==
England were joint winners of the 1886 British Home Championship with Scotland.

Date	Venue	Opponents	Score*	Comp	England scorers
13 March 1886	Ballynafeigh Park, Belfast (A)	Ireland	6–1	BHC	Benjamin Spilsbury (Cambridge University) (4), Tinsley Lindley (Cambridge University) & Fred Dewhurst (Preston North End)
27 March 1886	(Second) Hampden Park, Glasgow (A)	Scotland	1–1	BHC	Tinsley Lindley (Cambridge University) (35 mins)
29 March 1886	Racecourse Ground, Wrexham (A)	Wales	3–1	BHC	George Brann (Swifts), Fred Dewhurst (Preston North End) & Andrew Amos (Old Carthusians)

* England score given first

Key

- A = Away match
- BHC = British Home Championship

Note – see Talk page re query on goalscorers against Wales.

== Events ==
- Millwall Rovers was formed, and played their first match on 3 October 1885. After a couple of name changes and moves, the club would eventually become known as Millwall.

== Honours ==
Competition	Winner
FA Cup	Blackburn Rovers (3)

Notes = Number in parentheses is the times that club has won that honour. * indicates new record for competition
