= John Vaughan =

John Vaughan may refer to:

== Gentry ==
- John Vaughan, 1st Earl of Carbery (1574/75–1634), Welsh courtier and MP for Carmarthenshire 1601, 1621
- John Vaughan, 3rd Earl of Carbery (1639–1713), Governor of Jamaica and President of the Royal Society, MP for Carmarthen 1661 and Carmarthenshire 1679–86
- John Vaughan, 1st Viscount Lisburne (1667–1721)
- John Vaughan, 2nd Viscount Lisburne (1695–1741), MP for Cardiganshire 1727–34
- John Vaughan, 3rd Earl of Lisburne (1769–1831), MP for Cardigan 1796–1818
- Sir John Vaughan (puisne judge) (1768–1839), baron of the Exchequer and justice of the Common Pleas
- John Vaughan, 8th Earl of Lisburne (1918–2014)

== Military ==
- Sir John Vaughan (governor) (died 1643), army officer and military governor of Derry 1611–1643, and MP for County Donegal in 1613 and 1634
- John Vaughan (British Army officer, born 1871) (1871–1956), British cavalry officer commanded the 3rd Cavalry Division in the First World War
- Sir John Vaughan (British Army officer, died 1795) (c. 1731–1795), British army officer and Member of Parliament for Berwick-upon-Tweed 1774–95
- John Vaughan (East India Company officer) (1778–1830), British East India Company army officer

== Law and politics ==
- John Vaughan (died 1577), MP for Herefordshire, Horsham, Surrey, Petersfield, Bletchingley, Hedon, Northumberland, Dartmouth and Grantham
- John Vaughan (died 1574) (1525–1574), MP for Carmarthen Boroughs, 1558 and Carmarthenshire, 1572
- John Vaughan (by 1553-97 or later), MP for Pembroke 1594, 1586
- Sir John Vaughan (chief justice) (1603–1674), MP for Cardigan 1628–45 and Cardiganshire 1661–68, Chief Justice of Common Pleas
- John Vaughan (MP for Montgomery) (c. 1654–c. 1713), MP for Montgomery 1701–05
- John Vaughan (1693–1765), MP for Carmarthenshire 1745–54
- John Vaughan (died 1804) (c. 1752–1804) of Golden Grove, Carmarthenshire, MP for Carmarthenshire, 1779–1804
- John Vaughan (Australian politician) (1879–1955), Attorney-General of South Australia
- John Vaughan (ironmaster) (1799–1868), 19th century British ironmaster and mayor of Middlesbrough
- John Vaughan (MP for Merioneth), Welsh politician who sat in the House of Commons in 1654
- John Henry Vaughan (1892–1965), lawyer and ornithologist; Attorney General of Zanzibar and later of Fiji

== Sportsmen ==
- John Vaughan (footballer, born 1856) (1856–1935), Welsh international footballer
- John Owen Vaughan (1863–1952), Welsh international footballer
- John Vaughan (cricketer) (born 1945), Canadian cricketer
- John Vaughan (footballer, born 1964) (1964–2026), English football goalkeeper

== Other ==
- John Vaughan (wine merchant) (1756–1841), treasurer and librarian of the American Philosophical Society
- John Vaughan (architect), American architect active in 1891 in Salt Lake City, Utah
- John Vaughan (plant scientist) (1926–2005), British food scientist
- John Vaughan (bishop) (1853–1925), English Catholic bishop
- Johnny Vaughan (born 1966), English broadcaster and journalist
- John Vaughan (Canon of Windsor) (died 1499), Canon of Windsor
- John Vaughan (naturalist) (1855–1922), Canon of Winchester, rector of Droxford and naturalist
- Jon the Dentist (born 1965), British music record producer

== See also ==
- Jack Vaughan (disambiguation)
- John Vaughn (disambiguation)
