= England national football team records and statistics =

The history of the England national men's football team, also known as the Three Lions, begins with the first representative international match in 1870 and the first officially-recognised match two years later. England primarily competed in the British Home Championship over the following decades. Although the FA had joined the international governing body of association football FIFA in 1906, the relationship with the British associations was fraught. In 1928, the British nations withdrew from FIFA, in a dispute over payments to amateur players. This meant that England did not enter the first three World Cups.

The Three Lions first entered the World Cup in 1950 and have since qualified for 17 of the 20 finals tournaments to 2026. They won the 1966 World Cup on home soil, making them one of only eight nations to have won a FIFA World Cup. They have reached the semi-finals on three other occasions, in 1990, 2018 and 2026. The Three Lions have been eliminated from the World Cup quarter-final stage on seven occasions – more often than any other nation. England failed to qualify for the finals in 1974, 1978, and 1994.

England also compete in the UEFA European Championship. During the 2020 European Championships, they reached the final of the competition for the first time, finishing as runners-up. They were also runners-up in the next competition, in 2024. England reached the semi-finals in 1968 and 1996 with the latter held on home soil. England's most capped player and top scorer is Harry Kane with 126 caps and 92 goals. England compete in the FIFA World Cup, UEFA European Championship, and UEFA Nations League. However, as a constituent country of the United Kingdom, England are not a member of the International Olympic Committee so are not eligible to compete in the Olympic Games.

This list encompasses honours won by the England national men's team, and records set by both players and managers including appearance and goal records. It also records England men's record victories.

== Honours and achievements ==
Major

- FIFA World Cup
  - Champions: 1966
  - Third place: 2026
- UEFA European Championship
  - Runners-up: 2020, 2024
  - Third place: 1968
- UEFA Nations League
  - Third place: 2019

Regional

- British Home Championship
  - Champions outright (40): 1887–88, 1889–90, 1890–91, 1891–92, 1892–93, 1894–95, 1897–98, 1898–99, 1900–01, 1902–03, 1903–04, 1904–05, 1908–09, 1910–11, 1912–13, 1929–30, 1930–31, 1931–32, 1934–35, 1937–38, 1946–47, 1947–48, 1949–50, 1953–54, 1954–55, 1956–57, 1960–61, 1964–65, 1965–66, 1967–68, 1968–69, 1970–71, 1972–73, 1974–75, 1977–78, 1978–79, 1981–82, 1982–83
  - Shared (14): 1885–86, 1905–06, 1907–08, 1911–12, 1938–39, 1951–52, 1952–53, 1955–56, 1957–58, 1958–59, 1959–60, 1963–64, 1969–70, 1973–74
- Rous Cup
  - Champions: 1986, 1988, 1989

Minor

- England Challenge Cup
  - Champions: 1991
- Tournoi de France
  - Champions: 1997
- FA Summer Tournament
  - Champions: 2004

Awards

- FIFA World Cup:
  - FIFA Fair Play Trophy: 1990, 1998 (shared), 2022
- BBC Sports Personality of the Year:
  - BBC Sports Team of the Year Award: 1966, 2021

== Individual records ==
=== Player records ===
==== Appearances ====
Most appearances

Striker Harry Kane is England's most capped player

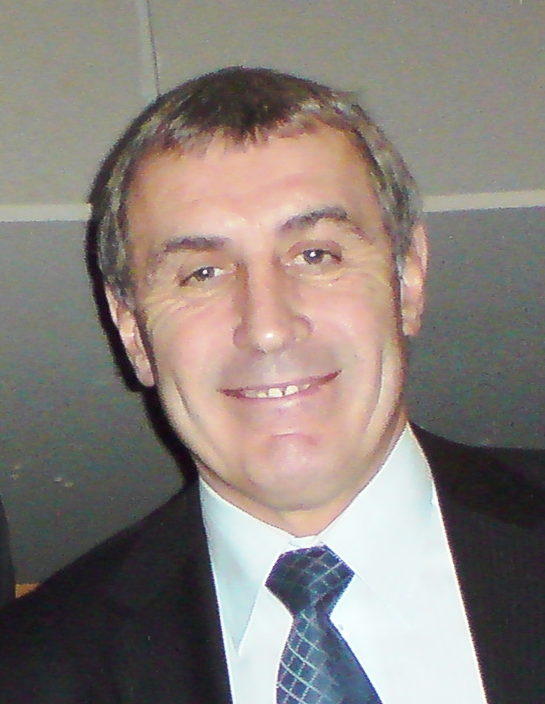
Goalkeeper Peter Shilton is England's second most capped players with 125 appearances.

| Rank | Player | Caps | Goals | Position | Career |
|---|---|---|---|---|---|
| 1 | Harry Kane | 126 | 93 | FW | 2015–Present |
| 2 | Peter Shilton | 125 | 0 | GK | 1970–1990 |
| 3 | Wayne Rooney | 120 | 53 | FW | 2003–2018 |
| 4 | David Beckham | 115 | 17 | MF | 1996–2009 |
| 5 | Steven Gerrard | 114 | 21 | MF | 2000–2014 |
| 6 | Bobby Moore | 108 | 2 | DF | 1962–1973 |
| 7 | Ashley Cole | 107 | 0 | DF | 2001–2014 |
| 8 | Bobby Charlton | 106 | 49 | MF | 1958–1970 |
| 8 | Frank Lampard | 106 | 29 | MF | 1999–2014 |
| 10 | Billy Wright | 105 | 3 | DF | 1946–1959 |

First player to reach 100 appearances
Billy Wright, 11 April 1959, 1–0 vs. Scotland
Fastest to reach 100 appearances
Harry Kane, 9 years 167 days, 27 March 2015 – 10 September 2024
Most consecutive appearances (Note: Billy Wright's consecutive appearances were the last 70 of his international career. He had a further streak of 33 consecutive appearances at the start of his career, a total only exceeded by Ron Flowers (40) and Kenny Sansom (37), and equalled by Roger Byrne and David Watson.)
Billy Wright, 70, 3 October 1951 – 28 May 1959
Most appearances as a substitute
Marcus Rashford, 43, 16 June 2016 – 18 July 2026
Most consecutive appearances as a substitute
Owen Hargreaves, 14, 1 June 2004 – 10 June 2006
Most appearances as a substitute without ever starting a game
Morgan Gibbs-White, 10, 7 September 2024 – Present
Most appearances without ever completing a full game
Dominic Calvert-Lewin, 12, 8 October 2020 – 27 March 2026
Most appearances in competitive matches (World Cup, European Championships, Nations League and qualifiers)
Harry Kane, 98, 27 March 2015 – 27 June 2026
Longest England career
Stanley Matthews, 22 years 228 days, 29 September 1934 – 15 May 1957
Shortest England career
Martin Kelly, 2 minutes, 26 May 2012, 1–0 vs. Norway
Most consecutive appearances comprising entire England career
Roger Byrne, 33, 3 April 1954 – 27 November 1957
Youngest player
Theo Walcott, 17 years 75 days, 30 May 2006, 3–1 vs. Hungary
Oldest player
Stanley Matthews, 42 years 103 days, 15 May 1957, 4–1 vs. Denmark
Oldest debutant (Note: There is some dispute about Alexander Morten's date of birth, which is usually cited as 15 November 1831. If Morten is excluded, the oldest England debutant is Leslie Compton (q.v.).)
Alexander Morten, 41 years 113 days, 8 March 1873, 4–2 vs. Scotland
Oldest outfield debutant
Leslie Compton, 38 years 64 days, 15 November 1950, 4–2 vs. Wales
Most appearances at the World Cup finals
Jordan Pickford, 19, 18 June 2018 – 15 July 2026
Most appearances without ever playing at the World Cup finals
Dave Watson, 65, 3 April 1974 – 2 June 1982
Appearances at four World Cup final tournaments
Jordan Henderson, 2014, 2018, 2022 and 2026
Most non-playing selections for the World Cup finals
Alan Hodgkinson, 2, 1958 and 1962
George Eastham, 2, 1962 and 1966
Viv Anderson, 2, 1982 and 1986
Chris Woods, 2, 1986 and 1990
Martin Keown and Nigel Martyn, 2, 1998 and 2002
David James, 2, 2002 and 2006
Nick Pope, 2, 2018 and 2022
Oldest player to feature at the World Cup finals
Peter Shilton, 40 years, 292 days, 7 July 1990, 1–2 vs. Italy
Oldest outfield player to feature at the World Cup finals
Stanley Matthews, 39 years, 145 days, 26 June 1954, 2–4 vs. Uruguay
Youngest player to feature at the World Cup finals
Michael Owen, 18 years, 183 days, 15 June 1998, 2–0 vs. Tunisia
Oldest player to feature in a World Cup qualifying match
Stanley Matthews, 42 years, 103 days, 15 May 1957, 4–1 vs. Denmark
Youngest player to feature in a World Cup qualifying match
Jude Bellingham, 17 years, 249 days, 25 March 2021, 5–0 vs. San Marino
First player to debut at the World Cup finals
Laurie Hughes, 25 June 1950, 2–0 vs. Chile
Last player to debut at the World Cup finals
Allan Clarke, 7 June 1970, 1–0 vs. Czechoslovakia
Most appearances at the European Championship finals
Harry Kane, 18, 11 June 2016 – 14 July 2024
Most appearances without ever playing at the European Championship finals
Rio Ferdinand, 81, 15 November 1997 – 4 June 2011
Appearances at three European Championship final tournaments
Tony Adams, 1988, 1996 and 2000
Alan Shearer, 1992, 1996 and 2000
Sol Campbell and Gary Neville, 1996, 2000 and 2004
Steven Gerrard, 2000, 2004 and 2012
Wayne Rooney, 2004, 2012 and 2016
Jordan Henderson, 2012, 2016 and 2020
Harry Kane and Kyle Walker, 2016, 2020 and 2024
Most non-playing selections for the European Championship finals
Tony Dorigo, 2, 1988 and 1992
Ian Walker, 2, 1996 and 2004
Dean Henderson and Aaron Ramsdale, 2, 2020 and 2024
Oldest player to feature at the European Championship finals
Peter Shilton, 38 years, 271 days, 15 June 1988, 1–3 vs. Netherlands
Oldest outfield player to feature at the European Championship finals
Stuart Pearce, 34 years, 63 days, 26 June 1996, 1–1 vs. Germany
Youngest player to feature at the European Championship finals
Jude Bellingham, 17 years, 349 days, 13 June 2021, 1–0 vs. Croatia
Oldest player to feature in a European Championship qualifying match
David Seaman, 39 years, 27 days, 16 October 2002, 2–2 vs. Macedonia
Oldest outfield player to feature in a European Championship qualifying match
Stuart Pearce, 37 years, 137 days, 8 September 1999, 0–0 vs. Poland
Youngest player to feature in a European Championship qualifying match
Wayne Rooney, 17 years, 156 days, 29 March 2003, 2–0 vs. Liechtenstein
Only player to debut at the European Championship finals
Tommy Wright, 8 June 1968, 0–1 vs. Yugoslavia
Most appearances on aggregate at the World Cup and European Championship finals
Harry Kane, 29, 11 June 2016 – 14 July 2024
Most consecutive starts at the World Cup and European Championship finals
Jordan Pickford and John Stones, 26, 18 June 2018 – 14 July 2024
Most appearances without ever playing at the World Cup finals or the European Championship finals
Emlyn Hughes, 62, 5 November 1969 – 24 May 1980
Fewest appearances in total, having played at both the World Cup finals and European Championship finals
Tommy Wright, 11, 8 June 1968 – 7 June 1970
Most appearances without ever being in a World Cup or European Championship finals squad
Mick Channon, 46, 11 October 1972 – 7 September 1977
Most appearances without featuring in a competitive match
George Eastham, 19, 8 May 1963 – 3 July 1966
Most Home International (British Championship) appearances
Billy Wright, 38, 28 September 1946 – 11 April 1959
Most appearances without ever playing on a losing team
David Rocastle, 14, 14 September 1988 – 17 May 1992
Most appearances without ever playing on a winning team
Tommy Banks, 6, 18 May 1958 – 4 October 1958
Most appearances against a single opponent
Billy Wright, 13 vs. Ireland/Northern Ireland, 28 September 1946 – 4 October 1958 and vs. Scotland, 12 April 1947 – 11 April 1959
Most appearances against a single non-British opponent
Alan Ball, 8 vs. West Germany, 12 May 1965 – 12 March 1975
Most appearances at the old Wembley
Peter Shilton, 52, 25 November 1970 – 22 May 1990
Most appearances at the new Wembley
Kyle Walker, 40, 12 November 2011 – 24 March 2025
Most appearances at a single non-English ground
Billy Wright, 7, Windsor Park, Belfast, 28 September 1946 – 4 October 1958
Most appearances at a single non-British ground
Glenn Hoddle and Kenny Sansom, 5, Azteca Stadium, Mexico City, 6 June 1985 – 22 June 1986
Most consecutive years of appearances
David Seaman, 15, 1988 to 2002 inclusive
Rio Ferdinand, 15, 1997 to 2011 inclusive
Most appearances in a single calendar year
Jack Charlton, 16, 1966
Harry Kane, 16, 2021
Longest gap between appearances
Ian Callaghan, 11 years 49 days, 20 July 1966, 2–0 vs. France – 7 September 1977, 0–0 vs. Switzerland (Note: England played 108 internationals between these two appearances, Ian Callaghan's second and third caps. This is also a record.)
Most tournaments appeared in consecutively
Sol Campbell, 6, 1996 European Championships – 2006 World Cup
Wayne Rooney, 6, 2004 European Championships – 2016 European Championships
Jordan Henderson, 6, 2012 European Championships – 2022 World Cup
Appearances in three separate decades
Sam Hardy and Jesse Pennington, 1900s, 1910s, 1920s
Stanley Matthews, 1930s, 1940s, 1950s
Bobby Charlton, 1950s, 1960s, 1970s
Emlyn Hughes, 1960s, 1970s, 1980s
Peter Shilton, 1970s, 1980s, 1990s
Tony Adams and David Seaman, 1980s, 1990s, 2000s
Wes Brown, Jamie Carragher, Rio Ferdinand, Emile Heskey, David James and Frank Lampard, 1990s, 2000s, 2010s
Only player to make World Cup or European Championship finals appearances in three separate decades
Tony Adams, 1988 European Championships; 1996 European Championships and 1998 World Cup; 2000 European Championships
Most appearances in the same team
Ashley Cole and Steven Gerrard, 76, 2001 – 2014
Harry Kane and Kyle Walker, 76, 2015 – 2025
Most appearances by a set of brothers
Gary and Phil Neville, 144, 1995 – 2007
Appearances under the most managers
First appearance by a player who had never played for an English club<
Joe Baker, of Hibernian, 18 November 1959, 2–1 vs. Northern Ireland
First player to debut as a substitute
Norman Hunter, 8 December 1965, 2–0 vs. Spain
Last appearance by a player from outside the top division of a country
Sam Johnstone, 9 October 2021, 5–0 vs. Andorra
Johnny Haynes, 32, 2 October 1954 – 28 May 1959
Most appearances by a player from outside the top two divisions
Reg Matthews, 5, 14 April 1956 – 6 October 1956
Most appearances by a player from outside the English League system
David Beckham, 55, 20 August 2003 – 14 October 2009 (Note: David Beckham won 36 caps with Real Madrid, 14 with LA Galaxy and 5 while on loan from LA Galaxy to Milan.)
Capped by another country
John Hawley Edwards and Robert Evans (Wales)
Jack Reynolds (Ireland)
Gordon Hodgson (South Africa)
Ken Armstrong (New Zealand)
Jackie Sewell (Zambia)
Wilfried Zaha (Ivory Coast)
Declan Rice (Republic of Ireland)
Steven Caulker (Sierra Leone)
Club providing the most England internationals in total
Tottenham Hotspur, 81
Non-English club providing the most England internationals in total
Rangers, and AC Milan,
Most appearances per English club (Note: Only English clubs which remain in existence to this day have been included. Numerous now-defunct or franchised clubs have also provided England international players.)

| Club | Player | Caps (total) | First cap – last cap |
|---|---|---|---|
| Arsenal | Kenny Sansom | 77 (86) | 10 September 1980 – 18 June 1988 |
| Aston Villa | Gareth Southgate | 42 (57) | 12 December 1995 – 25 May 2001 |
| Barnsley | George Utley | 1 | 15 February 1913 |
| Birmingham City | Harry Hibbs | 25 | 20 November 1929 – 5 February 1936 |
| Blackburn Rovers | Bob Crompton | 41 | 3 March 1902 – 4 April 1914 |
| Blackpool | Jimmy Armfield | 43 | 13 May 1959 – 26 June 1966 |
| Bolton Wanderers | Nat Lofthouse | 33 | 22 November 1950 – 26 November 1958 |
| Bournemouth | Callum Wilson | 4 (9) | 15 November 2018 – 14 October 2019 |
| Bradford City | Evelyn Lintott | 4 (7) | 13 February 1909 – 31 May 1909 |
| Brentford | Ivan Toney | 6 (7) | 26 March 2023 – 14 July 2024 |
| Brighton & Hove Albion | Lewis Dunk | 6 | 15 November 2018 – 3 June 2024 |
| Bristol City | Billy Wedlock | 26 | 16 February 1907 – 16 March 1914 |
| Bristol Rovers | Geoff Bradford | 1 | 2 October 1955 |
| Burnley | Bob Kelly | 11 (14) | 10 April 1920 – 4 April 1925 |
| Charlton Athletic | Luke Young | 7 | 28 May 2005 – 12 November 2005 |
| Chelsea | Frank Lampard | 104 (106) | 15 August 2001 – 24 June 2014 |
| Coventry City | Reg Matthews | 5 | 14 April 1956 – 6 October 1956 |
| Crewe Alexandra | John Pearson | 1 | 5 March 1892 |
| Crystal Palace | Marc Guéhi | 26 | 26 March 2022 – 9 October 2025 |
| Derby County | Peter Shilton | 34 (125) | 9 September 1987 – 7 July 1990 |
| Everton | Jordan Pickford | 93 | 10 November 2017 – 6 October 2026 |
| Fulham | Johnny Haynes | 56 | 2 October 1954 – 10 June 1962 |
| Grimsby Town | Jackie Bestall | 1 | 6 February 1935 |
| Grimsby Town | George Tweedy | 1 | 2 December 1936 |
| Grimsby Town | Harry Betmead | 1 | 20 May 1937 |
| Huddersfield Town | Ray Wilson | 30 (63) | 9 April 1960 – 6 June 1964 |
| Ipswich Town | Terry Butcher | 45 (77) | 31 May 1980 – 22 June 1986 |
| Leeds United | Jack Charlton | 35 | 10 April 1965 – 11 June 1970 |
| Leicester City | Gordon Banks | 37 (73) | 6 April 1963 – 15 April 1967 |
| Leyton Orient | Owen Williams | 2 | 21 October 1922 – 5 March 1923 |
| Leyton Orient | John Townrow | 2 | 4 April 1925 – 1 March 1926 (Note: Leyton Orient was known as Clapton Orient during the period when their two players were capped by England.) |
| Liverpool | Steven Gerrard | 114 | 31 May 2000 – 24 June 2014 |
| Luton Town | Robert Hawkes | 5 | 16 February 1907 – 13 June 1908 |
| Luton Town | Paul Walsh | 5 | 12 June 1983 – 2 May 1984 |
| Manchester City | John Stones | 74 (84) | 4 September 2016 – 9 October 2025 |
| Manchester United | Bobby Charlton | 106 | 19 April 1958 – 14 June 1970 |
| Middlesbrough | Wilf Mannion | 26 | 28 September 1946 – 3 October 1951 |
| Millwall | Leonard Graham | 2 | 28 February 1925 – 4 April 1925 |
| Millwall | Reg Smith | 2 | 9 November 1938 – 16 November 1938 |
| Newcastle United | Alan Shearer | 35 (63) | 1 September 1996 – 20 June 2000 |
| Norwich City | Dave Watson | 6 (12) | 10 June 1984 – 23 April 1986 |
| Nottingham Forest | Stuart Pearce | 76 (78) | 19 May 1987 – 4 June 1997 |
| Notts County | Henry Cursham | 8 | 15 March 1880 – 23 February 1884 |
| Oldham Athletic | John Hacking | 3 | 22 October 1928 – 13 April 1929 |
| Portsmouth | Jimmy Dickinson | 48 | 18 May 1949 – 5 December 1956 |
| Preston North End | Tom Finney | 76 | 28 September 1946 – 22 October 1958 |
| Queens Park Rangers | Terry Fenwick | 19 (20) | 2 May 1984 – 22 June 1986 |
| Reading | Herbert Smith | 4 | 27 March 1905 – 19 March 1906 |
| Sheffield United | Ernest Needham | 16 | 7 April 1894 – 3 March 1902 |
| Sheffield Wednesday | Ron Springett | 33 | 18 November 1959 – 29 June 1966 |
| Southampton | Peter Shilton | 49 (125) | 22 September 1982 – 19 May 1987 |
| Stockport County | Harry Hardy | 1 | 8 December 1924 |
| Stoke City | Gordon Banks | 36 (73) | 21 October 1967 – 27 May 1972 |
| Sunderland | Dave Watson | 14 (65) | 3 April 1974 – 24 May 1975 |
| Swindon Town | Harold Fleming | 11 | 3 April 1909 – 4 April 1914 |
| Tottenham Hotspur | Harry Kane | 84 (125) | 27 March 2015 – 19 June 2023 |
| Walsall | Alf Jones | 2 (3) | 11 March 1882 – 13 March 1882 |
| Watford | John Barnes | 31 (79) | 28 May 1983 – 19 May 1987 |
| West Bromwich Albion | Jesse Pennington | 25 | 18 March 1907 – 10 April 1920 |
| West Ham United | Bobby Moore | 108 | 20 May 1962 – 14 November 1973 |
| Wigan Athletic | Emile Heskey | 7 (62) | 8 September 2007 – 15 October 2008 |
| Wolverhampton Wanderers | Billy Wright | 105 | 28 September 1946 – 28 May 1959 |

Most appearances with non-English clubs

| Club | Country | Player | Caps (total) | First cap – Last cap |
|---|---|---|---|---|
| Ajax | (Netherlands) | Jordan Henderson | 3 (86) | 21 March 2025 – 7 June 2025 |
| Al-Ahli | (Saudi Arabia) | Ivan Toney | 1 (7) | 10 June 2025 |
| Al-Ettifaq | (Saudi Arabia) | Jordan Henderson | 4 (86) | 9 September 2023 – 17 November 2023 |
| Atlético Madrid | (Spain) | Kieran Trippier | 19 (54) | 7 September 2019 – 9 October 2021 |
| Barcelona | (Spain) | Gary Lineker | 24 (80) | 15 October 1986 – 7 June 1989 |
| Bari | (Italy) | David Platt | 10 (62) | 11 September 1991 – 17 June 1992 |
| Bayern Munich | (Germany) | Harry Kane | 41 (125) | 09 September 2023 – 06 October 2026 |
| Borussia Dortmund | (Germany) | Jude Bellingham | 24 (60) | 12 November 2020 – 26 March 2023 |
| Bursaspor | (Turkey) | Scott Carson | 1 (4) | 15 November 2011 |
| Cardiff City | (Wales) | Jay Bothroyd | 1 | 17 November 2010 |
| Celtic | (Scotland) | Fraser Forster | 2 (6) | 15 November 2013 – 7 June 2014 |
| Cologne | (Germany) | Tony Woodcock | 18 (42) | 22 November 1979 – 5 July 1982 |
| D.C. United | (United States) | Wayne Rooney | 1 (120) | 15 November 2018 |
| Hamburg | (Germany) | Kevin Keegan | 25 (63) | 8 June 1977 – 18 June 1980 |
| Hibernian | (Scotland) | Joe Baker | 5 (8) | 18 November 1959 – 22 May 1960< |
| Inter Milan | (Italy) | Paul Ince | 17 (53) | 27 March 1996 – 10 June 1997 |
| Juventus | (Italy) | David Platt | 10 (62) | 9 September 1992 – 19 June 1993 |
| Lazio | (Italy) | Paul Gascoigne | 12 (57) | 14 October 1992 – 11 June 1995 |
| LA Galaxy | (United States) | David Beckham | 14 (115) | 22 August 2007 – 14 October 2009 |
| Lille | (France) | Angel Gomes | 4 | 7 September 2024 – 17 November 2024 |
| Marseille | (France) | Chris Waddle | 18 (62) | 6 September 1989 – 16 October 1991 |
| Milan | (Italy) | Ray Wilkins | 22 (84) | 12 September 1984 – 12 November 1986 |
| Monaco | (France) | Glenn Hoddle | 9 (53) | 9 September 1987 – 18 June 1988 |
| Rangers | (Scotland) | Terry Butcher | 32 (77) | 10 September 1986 – 4 July 1990 |
| Real Madrid | (Spain) | Jude Bellingham | 36 (60) | 9 September 2023 – 6 October 2026 |
| Roma | (Italy) | Tammy Abraham | 5 (11) | 17 August 2021 – 11 June 2022 |
| Sampdoria | (Italy) | Trevor Francis | 20 (52) | 22 September 1982 – 23 April 1986 |
| Swansea City | (Wales) | Jonjo Shelvey | 5 (6) | 5 September 2015 – 17 November 2015 |
| Torino | (Italy) | Joe Hart | 5 (75) | 4 September 2016 – 15 November 2016 |
| Werder Bremen | (Germany) | Dave Watson | 2 (65) | 12 September 1979 – 17 October 1979 |

England starting XI based on appearances

| No. | Position | Player | Caps | Years |
|---|---|---|---|---|
| 1 | Goalkeeper | Peter Shilton | 125 | 1970–1990 |
| 2 | Right back | Kyle Walker | 96 | 2011–2025 |
| 5 | Central defence | Billy Wright | 105 | 1946–1959 |
| 6 | Central defence | Bobby Moore | 108 | 1962–1973 |
| 3 | Left back | Ashley Cole | 107 | 2001–2014 |
| 7 | Midfield | David Beckham | 115 | 1996–2009 |
| 4 | Midfield | Steven Gerrard | 114 | 2000–2014 |
| 8 | Midfield | Frank Lampard | 106 | 1999–2014 |
| 9 | Forward | Bobby Charlton | 106 | 1958–1970 |
| 10 | Forward | Wayne Rooney | 120 | 2003–2018 |
| 11 | Forward | Harry Kane | 125 | 2015–2026 |

==== Goals ====
Top goalscorers

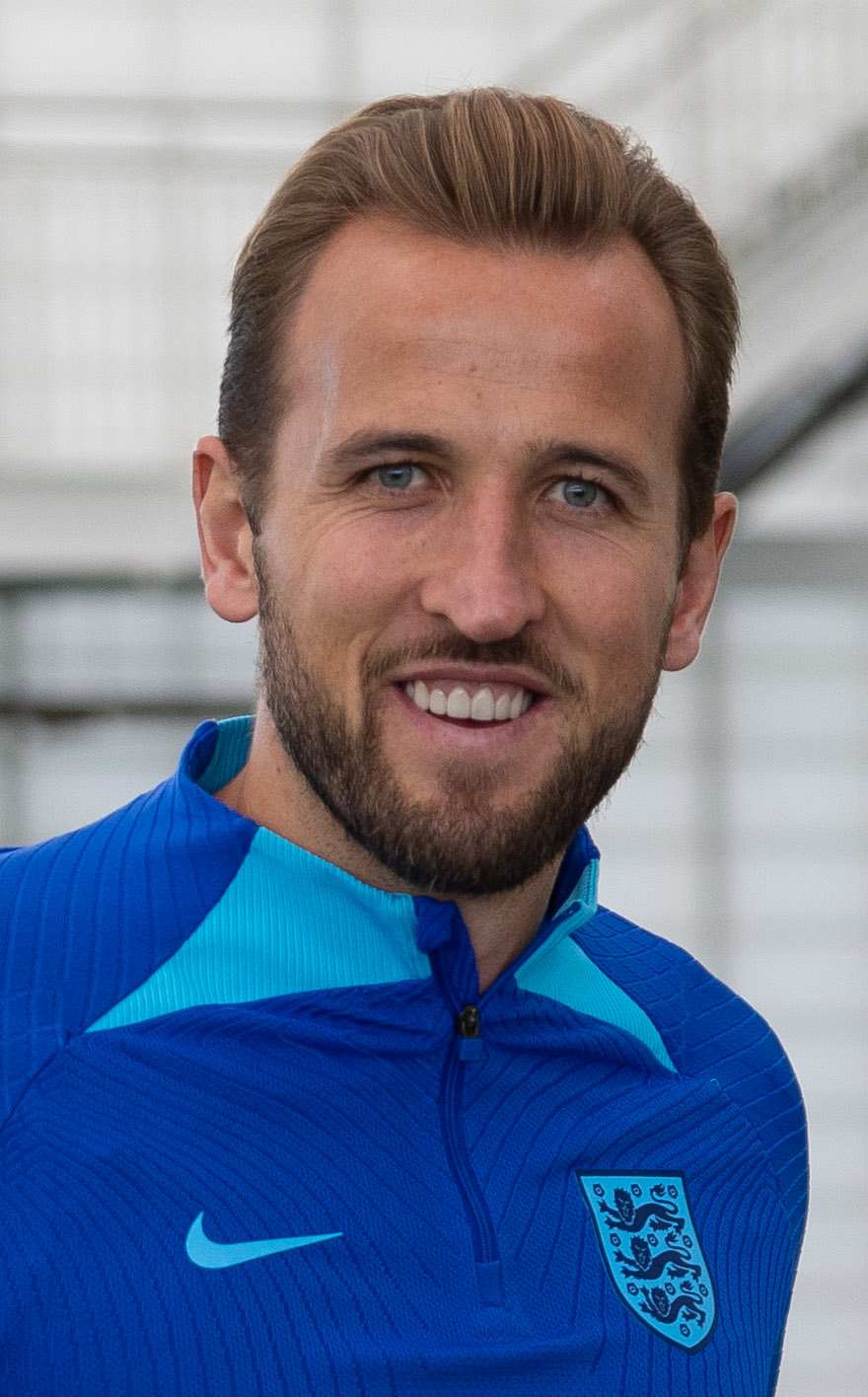
Harry Kane is England's all-time top scorer with 91 goals.

| Rank | Player | Goals | Caps | Average | Career |
|---|---|---|---|---|---|
| 1 | Harry Kane (list) | 93 | 127 | 0.73 | 2015–2026 |
| 2 | Wayne Rooney (list) | 53 | 120 | 0.44 | 2003–2018 |
| 3 | Bobby Charlton (list) | 49 | 106 | 0.46 | 1958–1970 |
| 4 | Gary Lineker | 48 | 80 | 0.60 | 1984–1992 |
| 5 | Jimmy Greaves | 44 | 57 | 0.77 | 1959–1967 |
| 6 | Michael Owen | 40 | 89 | 0.45 | 1998–2008 |
| 7 | Nat Lofthouse | 30 | 33 | 0.91 | 1950–1958 |
| 7 | Alan Shearer | 30 | 63 | 0.48 | 1992–2000 |
| 7 | Tom Finney | 30 | 76 | 0.39 | 1946–1958 |
| 10 | Vivian Woodward | 29 | 23 | 1.26 | 1903–1911 |
| 10 | Frank Lampard | 29 | 106 | 0.27 | 1999–2014 |

Goal contributions at major tournaments

| Rank | Player | World Cup | | | Euros | | | Total | | | Tournaments |
| Rank | Player | Goals | Assists | Contr. | Goals | Assists | Contr. | Goals | Assists | Total | Tournaments |
|---|---|---|---|---|---|---|---|---|---|---|---|
| 1 | Harry Kane^{†} | 14 | 4 | 18 | 7 | 0 | 7 | 21 | 4 | 25 | 6 (2016, 2018, 2020, 2022, 2024, 2026) |
| 2 | David Beckham^{‡§} | 3 | 6 | 9 | 0 | 5 | 5 | 3 | 11 | 14 | 5 (1998, 2000, 2002, 2004, 2006) |
| 3 | Jude Bellingham | 8 | 2 | 10 | 2 | 1 | 3 | 10 | 3 | 13 | 3 (2022, 2024, 2026) |
| 4 | Gary Lineker | 10 | 0 | 10 | 0 | 2 | 2 | 10 | 2 | 12 | 4 (1986, 1988, 1990, 1992) |
| 5 | Bukayo Saka | 6 | 3 | 9 | 1 | 1 | 2 | 7 | 4 | 11 | 3 (2022, 2024, 2026) |
| 6 | Alan Shearer | 2 | 0 | 2 | 7 | 0 | 7 | 9 | 0 | 9 | 3 (1996, 1998, 2000) |
| 7 | Wayne Rooney | 1 | 1 | 2 | 6 | 1 | 7 | 7 | 2 | 9 | 6 (2004, 2006, 2010, 2012, 2014, 2016) |
| 8 | Geoff Hurst | 5 | 1 | 6 | 1 | 1 | 2 | 6 | 2 | 8 | 3 (1966, 1968, 1970) |
| 9 | Michael Owen | 4 | 0 | 4 | 2 | 2 | 4 | 6 | 2 | 8 | 5 (1998, 2000, 2002, 2004, 2006) |
| 10 | Steven Gerrard | 3 | 1 | 4 | 1 | 3 | 4 | 4 | 4 | 8 | 5 (2004, 2006, 2010, 2012, 2014) |
English record at the World Cup English record at the Euros English record at major tournaments^{†} Scored at most tournaments (5)^{‡} Assisted at most tournaments (5)^{§} Contributed at most tournaments (5)

First goal
William Kenyon-Slaney, 8 March 1873, 4–2 vs. Scotland
Most goals
Harry Kane, 82, 27 March 2015 – 27 June 2026
Most goals in competitive matches (World Cup, European Championship, Nations League and qualifiers)
Harry Kane, 69, 27 March 2015 – 27 June 2026
Most goals in a match
Howard Vaughton, Steve Bloomer, Willie Hall and Malcolm Macdonald, all five
Four goals or more in a match on the greatest number of occasions
Steve Bloomer, Vivian Woodward, Tommy Lawton, Jimmy Greaves and Gary Lineker, twice each
Three goals or more in a match on the greatest number of occasions
Jimmy Greaves, six times
Scoring in most consecutive internationals
Tinsley Lindley, 6, 5 February 1887 – 7 April 1888
Jimmy Windridge, 6, 16 March – 13 June 1908
Tommy Lawton, 6, 22 October 1938 – 13 May 1939
Harry Kane, 6, 7 September – 17 November 2019; 4 December 2022 – 19 June 2023
Scoring in most consecutive appearances
Steve Bloomer, 10, 9 March 1895 – 20 March 1899
Most appearances, scoring in every match
George Camsell, 9, 9 May 1929 – 9 May 1936
Most goals on debut
Howard Vaughton, 5, 18 February 1882, 13–0 vs. Ireland
Most goals in a World Cup tournament
Jude Bellingham, 7, 2026 World Cup
Most goals in total at World Cup tournaments
Harry Kane, 13, 3 July 2018 – 1 July 2026
Most goals in a World Cup qualifying campaign
Harry Kane, 12, 2022 World Cup qualifying
Most goals in a World Cup finals match
Geoff Hurst, 3, 30 July 1966, 4–2 vs. West Germany
Gary Lineker, 3, 11 June 1986, 3–0 vs. Poland
Harry Kane, 3, 24 June 2018, 6–1 vs. Panama
Most goals in a World Cup qualifying match
Jack Rowley, 4, 15 October 1949, 9–2 vs. Northern Ireland
David Platt, 4, 17 February 1993, 6–0 vs. San Marino
Ian Wright, 4, 17 November 1993, 7–1 vs. San Marino
Harry Kane, 4, 15 November 2021, 10–0 vs. San Marino
First goal in a World Cup finals match
Stan Mortensen, 25 June 1950, 2–0 vs. Chile
First goal in a World Cup qualifying campaign
Stan Mortensen, 15 October 1949, 4–1 vs. Wales
Oldest goalscorer at the World Cup finals
Tom Finney, 36 years, 64 days, 8 June 1958, 2–2 vs. Soviet Union
Youngest goalscorer at the World Cup finals
Michael Owen, 18 years, 190 days, 22 June 1998, 1–2 vs. Romania
Oldest goalscorer in a World Cup qualifying match
Teddy Sheringham, 35 years, 187 days, 6 October 2001, 2–2 vs. Greece
Youngest goalscorer in a World Cup qualifying match
Myles Lewis-Skelly, 18 years, 176 days, 21 March 2025, 2–0 vs. Albania
Most goals in a European Championship tournament
Alan Shearer, 5, 1996 European Championship
Most goals in total at European Championship tournaments
Alan Shearer, 7, 8 June 1996 – 20 June 2000
Harry Kane, 7, 29 June 2021 – 10 July 2024
Most goals in a European Championship qualifying campaign
Harry Kane, 12, 2020 European Championship qualifying (Note: Including at least one goal in each match, the only time an England player has achieved this in either a World Cup or European Championship qualifying campaign.)
Most goals in a European Championship finals match
Alan Shearer, 2, 18 June 1996, 4–1 vs. Netherlands
Teddy Sheringham, 2, 18 June 1996, 4–1 vs. Netherlands
Wayne Rooney, 2, 17 June 2004, 3–0 vs. Switzerland and 21 June 2004, 4–2 vs. Croatia
Harry Kane, 2, 3 July 2021, 4–0 vs. Ukraine
Most goals in a European Championship qualifying match
Malcolm Macdonald, 5, 16 April 1975, 5–0 vs. Cyprus
First goal in a European Championship finals match
Bobby Charlton, 8 June 1968, 2–0 vs. Soviet Union
First goal in a European Championship qualifying campaign
Ron Flowers, 3 October 1962, 1–1 vs. France
Oldest goalscorer at the European Championship finals
Trevor Brooking, 31 years, 260 days, 18 June 1980, 2–1 vs. Spain
Youngest goalscorer at the European Championship finals
Wayne Rooney, 18 years, 236 days, 17 June 2004, 3–0 vs. Switzerland
Oldest goalscorer in a European Championship qualifying match
Kyle Walker, 33 years, 104 days, 9 September 2023, 1–1 vs. Ukraine
Youngest goalscorer in a European Championship qualifying match
Wayne Rooney, 17 years, 317 days, 6 September 2003, 2–1 vs. Macedonia
Most Home International Championship goals
Steve Bloomer, 28, 9 March 1895 – 6 April 1907 (Note: All of Steve Bloomer's international appearances and goals were in the Home International Championships.)
Most goals in a calendar year
Harry Kane, 16, 2021
Most goals in an English season (Note: A season is assumed to run from 1 August to 31 July.)
Jimmy Greaves, 13, 1960–61
Most goals against the same opponent
Steve Bloomer, 12 vs. Wales, 16 March 1896 – 18 March 1901
Most goals against the same non-British opponent
Vivian Woodward, 8 vs. Austria, 6 June 1908 – 1 June 1909
Most goals scored from penalties
Harry Kane, 24, 13 June 2017 – 17 June 2026
Most penalties scored in a match
Tom Finney, 2, 14 May 1950, 5–2 vs. Portugal
Geoff Hurst, 2, 13 March 1969, 5–0 vs. France
Gary Lineker, 2, 1 July 1990, 3–2 vs. Cameroon
Harry Kane, 2, 24 June 2018, 6–1 vs. Panama, 7 September 2019, 4–0 vs. Bulgaria and 15 November 2021, 10–0 vs. San Marino
Most goals in penalty shoot-outs
Michael Owen, David Platt and Alan Shearer, 3
Most goals scored by a defender
Harry Maguire, 7, 7 July 2018 – 15 November 2021
Oldest goalscorer
Stanley Matthews, 41 years, 248 days, 6 October 1956, 1–1 vs. Northern Ireland
Oldest goalscorer on debut
Jimmy Moore, 34 years, 114 days, 21 May 1923, 4–2 vs. Sweden
Youngest goalscorer
Wayne Rooney, 17 years, 317 days, 6 September 2003, 2–1 vs. Macedonia
Youngest goalscorer on debut
Myles Lewis-Skelly, 18 years, 176 days, 21 March 2025, 2–0 vs. Albania
First goal by a substitute
Jimmy Mullen, 18 May 1950, 4–1 vs. Belgium
Fastest goal from kick-off
Tommy Lawton, 17 seconds, 25 May 1947, 10–0 vs. Portugal
Fastest goal at Wembley
Bryan Robson, 38 seconds, 13 December 1989, 2–1 vs. Yugoslavia
Fastest goal at the World Cup finals
Bryan Robson, 27 seconds, 16 June 1982, 3–1 vs. France
Fastest goal at the European Championship finals
Luke Shaw, 1 minute, 57 seconds, 11 July 2021, 1–1 vs. Italy
Fastest goal by a substitute
Teddy Sheringham, 15 seconds, 6 October 2001, 2–2 vs. Greece, 2002 World Cup qualifier
First player to score a hat-trick
Digger Brown or Howard Vaughton, 18 February 1882, 13–0 vs. Ireland (Note: Digger Brown scored four and his Aston Villa colleague Howard Vaughton 5 in this game. However, contemporary reports do not record the timing of the goals so it is not possible to say who achieved the hat-trick first.)
Oldest player to score a hat-trick
Gary Lineker, 30 years, 194 days, 12 June 1991, 4–2 vs. Malaysia
Youngest player to score a hat-trick
Theo Walcott, 19 years, 178 days, 10 September 2008, 4–1 vs. Croatia
Most appearances for an outfield player without ever scoring
Ashley Cole, 107, 28 March 2001 – 5 March 2014
Most goalscorers in a match
7, 15 December 1982, 9–0 vs. Luxembourg (Note: The goalscorers were Luther Blissett (3), Tony Woodcock, Steve Coppell, Glenn Hoddle, Mark Chamberlain, Phil Neal and Marcel Bossi, a Luxembourg player who scored an own goal.)
7, 22 March 2013, 8–0 vs. San Marino (Note: The goalscorers were Jermain Defoe (2), Alex Oxlade-Chamberlain, Ashley Young, Frank Lampard, Wayne Rooney, Daniel Sturridge and Allesandro Della Valle, a San Marino player who scored an own goal.)
7, 15 November 2021, 10–0 vs. San Marino (Note: The goalscorers were Harry Maguire, Harry Kane (4), Emile Smith Rowe, Tyrone Mings, Tammy Abraham, Bukayo Saka and Filippo Fabbri, a San Marino player who scored an own goal.)
Goals in three separate decades (Note: Tony Adams scored goals in non-consecutive decades (1980s and 2000s) but failed to score in the 1990s. He scored in his last game of the 1980s and in his first game of the 2000s.)
Stanley Matthews, 1930s, 1940s, 1950s
Bobby Charlton, 1950s, 1960s, 1970s
Most consecutive goalscoring tournaments
Michael Owen, 4, v Romania and Argentina, 1998 World Cup; v Romania, 2000 European Championships; v Denmark and Brazil, 2002 World Cup; v Portugal, 2004 European Championships
Harry Kane, 4, v Tunisia, Panama and Colombia, 2018 World Cup; v Germany, Ukraine and Denmark, 2020 European Championships; v Senegal and France, 2022 World Cup; v Denmark, Slovakia and Netherlands, 2024 European Championships
Longest gap between goals
Tony Adams, 11 years 196 days, 16 November 1988, 1–1 vs. Saudi Arabia – 31 May 2000, 2–0 vs. Ukraine
Last England goalscorer at the old Wembley
Tony Adams, 31 May 2000, 2–0 vs. Ukraine
First England goalscorer at the new Wembley
John Terry, 1 June 2007, 1–1 vs. Brazil
Highest goals to games average
George Camsell, 18 goals in 9 games, average 2.0 goals per game.
Most goals by a player from outside the top division of a country
Vivian Woodward, 29, 14 February 1903 – 3 March 1911
Most goals by a player from outside the top two divisions
Tommy Lawton, Joe Payne and Peter Taylor, all 2
Most goals by a player from outside the English League system
David Platt, 19, 17 May 1992 – 8 June 1995

| Club | Player | Goals (total) | First goal – last goal |
|---|---|---|---|
| Arsenal | Bukayo Saka | 13 | 2 June 2021 – 9 October 2025 |
| Aston Villa | Billy Walker | 9 | 23 October 1920 – 12 February 1927 |
| Birmingham City | Joe Bradford | 7 | 20 October 1923 – 22 November 1930 |
| Blackburn Rovers | Bryan Douglas | 11 | 19 April 1958 – 5 June 1963 |
| Blackpool | Stan Mortensen | 23 | 25 May 1947 – 25 November 1953 |
| Bolton Wanderers | Nat Lofthouse | 30 | 22 November 1950 – 22 October 1958 |
| Bournemouth | Callum Wilson | 1 (2) | 15 November 2018 |
| Brentford | Ivan Toney | 1 | 26 March 2024 |
| Bristol City | John Atyeo | 5 | 30 November 1955 – 19 May 1957 |
| Bristol Rovers | Geoff Bradford | 1 | 2 October 1955 |
| Burnley | Bob Kelly | 6 (8) | 10 April 1920 – 22 October 1924 |
| Charlton Athletic | Harold Miller | 1 | 24 May 1923 |
| Charlton Athletic | Harold Hobbis | 1 | 9 May 1936 |
| Charlton Athletic | Don Welsh | 1 | 24 May 1939 |
| Chelsea | Frank Lampard | 29 | 20 August 2003 – 29 May 2013 |
| Crystal Palace | Peter Taylor | 2 | 24 March 1976 – 8 May 1976 |
| Derby County | Steve Bloomer | 27 (28) | 9 March 1895 – 25 February 1905 |
| Everton | Dixie Dean | 18 | 12 February 1927 – 9 December 1931 |
| Fulham | Johnny Haynes | 18 | 2 October 1954 – 15 April 1961 |
| Huddersfield Town | George Brown | 5 | 20 October 1926 – 26 May 1927 |
| Ipswich Town | Paul Mariner | 13 | 12 October 1977 – 16 November 1983 |
| Leeds United | Allan Clarke | 10 | 11 June 1970 – 17 October 1973 |
| Leicester City | Jamie Vardy | 6 | 26 March 2016 – 26 March 2017 |
| Liverpool | Michael Owen | 26 (40) | 27 May 1998 – 24 June 2004 |
| Luton Town | Joe Payne | 2 | 20 May 1937 |
| Manchester City | Raheem Sterling | 17 (20) | 15 October 2018 – 29 March 2022 |
| Manchester United | Bobby Charlton | 49 | 19 April 1958 – 20 May 1970 |
| Middlesbrough | George Camsell | 18 | 9 May 1929 – 9 May 1936 |
| Millwall | Reg Smith | 2 | 9 November 1938 |
| Newcastle United | Alan Shearer | 20 (30) | 1 September 1996 – 20 June 2000 |
| Nottingham Forest | Stuart Pearce | 5 | 25 April 1990 – 15 November 1995 |
| Notts County | Henry Cursham | 5 | 18 February 1882 – 23 February 1884 |
| Portsmouth | Jack Smith | 4 | 17 October 1931 – 9 December 1931 |
| Preston North End | Tom Finney | 30 | 28 September 1946 – 4 October 1958 |
| Queens Park Rangers | Gerry Francis | 3 | 24 May 1975 – 11 May 1976 |
| Queens Park Rangers | Les Ferdinand | 3 (5) | 17 February 1993 – 17 November 1993 |
| Sheffield United | Ernest Needham | 3 | 29 March 1897 – 18 March 1901 |
| Sheffield United | Colin Grainger | 3 | 9 May 1956 – 26 May 1956 |
| Sheffield Wednesday | Fred Spiksley | 7 | 13 March 1893 – 3 March 1894 |
| Southampton | Mick Channon | 21 | 14 February 1973 – 4 June 1977 |
| Stoke City | Stanley Matthews | 8 (11) | 29 September 1934 – 16 November 1938 |
| Stoke City | Freddie Steele | 8 | 17 April 1937 – 20 May 1937 |
| Sunderland | George Holley | 8 | 15 March 1909 – 23 March 1912 |
| Swindon Town | Harold Fleming | 9 | 29 May 1909 – 4 April 1914 |
| Tottenham Hotspur | Harry Kane | 58 (82) | 27 March 2015 – 19 June 2023 |
| Watford | Luther Blissett | 3 | 15 December 1982 |
| Watford | John Barnes | 3 (11) | 10 June 1984 – 14 November 1984 |
| West Bromwich Albion | Billy Bassett | 8 | 23 February 1889 – 4 April 1896 (Note: Some authorities (e.g. englandfootballonline.com) credit Billy Bassett with 7 goals, only counting one in the 3–2 defeat by Scotland on 13 April 1889.) |
| West Bromwich Albion | Derek Kevan | 8 | 6 April 1957 – 28 May 1959 |
| West Ham United | Geoff Hurst | 24 | 2 April 1966 – 1 December 1971 |
| Wolverhampton Wanderers | Dennis Wilshaw | 10 | 10 October 1953 – 20 May 1956 |
| Wolverhampton Wanderers | Ron Flowers | 10 | 28 May 1959 – 3 October 1962 |

Most goals with non-English clubs

| Club | Country | Player | Goals (total) | First goal – last goal |
|---|---|---|---|---|
| Barcelona | (Spain) | Gary Lineker | 17 (48) | 15 October 1986 – 7 June 1989 |
| Bari | (Italy) | David Platt | 4 (27) | 17 May 1992 – 17 June 1992 |
| Bayern Munich | (Germany) | Harry Kane | 24 (82) | 12 September 2023 – 27 June 2026 |
| Borussia Dortmund | (Germany) | Jadon Sancho | 3 | 10 September 2019 – 12 November 2020 |
| Cologne | (Germany) | Tony Woodcock | 5 (16) | 26 March 1980 – 25 May 1982 |
| Hamburg | (Germany) | Kevin Keegan | 12 (21) | 16 November 1977 – 13 May 1980 |
| Hibernian | (Scotland) | Joe Baker | 1 (3) | 18 November 1959 |
| Inter Milan | (Italy) | Gerry Hitchens | 2 (5) | 9 May 1962 – 10 June 1962 |
| Juventus | (Italy) | David Platt | 9 (27) | 14 October 1992 – 19 June 1993 |
| Lazio | (Italy) | Paul Gascoigne | 4 (10) | 18 November 1992 – 8 September 1993 |
| Marseille | (France) | Trevor Steven | 1 (4) | 29 April 1992 |
| Milan | (Italy) | Mark Hateley | 8 (9) | 17 October 1984 – 24 May 1986 |
| Rangers | (Scotland) | Paul Gascoigne | 4 (10) | 23 May 1996 – 10 September 1997 |
| Real Madrid | (Spain) | David Beckham | 6 (17) | 20 August 2003 – 25 June 2006 |
| Real Madrid | (Spain) | Michael Owen | 6 (40) | 18 August 2004 – 31 May 2005 |
| Roma | (Italy) | Tammy Abraham | 2 (3) | 17 August 2021 – 15 November 2021 |
| Sampdoria | (Italy) | David Platt | 6 (27) | 9 March 1994 – 8 June 1995 |

==== Goalkeepers ====
Most clean sheets

| Rank | Player | Clean sheets | Caps | Average | Career |
|---|---|---|---|---|---|
| 1 | Peter Shilton | 66 | 125 | 0.53 | 1970–1990 |
| 2 | Joe Hart | 43 | 75 | 0.57 | 2008–2017 |
| 3 | Jordan Pickford | 41 | 79 | 0.52 | 2017–2025 |
| 4 | David Seaman | 40 | 75 | 0.53 | 1988–2002 |
| 5 | Gordon Banks | 35 | 73 | 0.48 | 1963–1972 |
| 6 | Ray Clemence | 27 | 61 | 0.44 | 1972–1983 |
| 7 | Chris Woods | 26 | 43 | 0.60 | 1985–1993 |
| 8 | Paul Robinson | 24 | 41 | 0.59 | 2003–2007 |
| 9 | David James | 21 | 53 | 0.40 | 1997–2010 |
| 10 | Nigel Martyn | 13 | 23 | 0.57 | 1992–2002 |

Most consecutive clean sheets
Jordan Pickford, 8, 14 November 2024 – 9 October 2025
Most penalty saves (Note: This record is specific to penalties 'saved' rather than 'not scored'. Two goalkeepers, Harry Hibbs and David Seaman, have faced three penalties from which the opposition failed to score. Each only actually saved one of the penalties faced, however. In both cases, one of the remaining penalties hit the crossbar and the other was sent wide.)
Ron Springett, 2, from Jimmy McIlroy of Northern Ireland, 18 November 1959 and from Oscar Montalvo of Peru, 20 May 1962
Most penalty saves in shoot outs
Jordan Pickford, 5, from Carlos Bacca of Colombia, 3 July 2018; Josip Drmić of Switzerland, 9 June 2019; Andrea Belotti and Jorginho of Italy, 11 July 2021; Manuel Akanji of Switzerland, 6 July 2024

==== Captains ====
First captain
Cuthbert Ottaway, 30 November 1872, 0–0 vs. Scotland
Most appearances as captain
Harry Kane, 92,
Most appearances, all as captain
George Hardwick, 13, 28 September 1946 – 10 April 1948
Youngest captain
Bobby Moore, 22 years 47 days, 29 May 1963, 4–2 vs. Czechoslovakia
Oldest captain (Note: There is some dispute about Alexander Morten's date of birth, which is usually cited as 15 November 1831. If Morten is excluded, the oldest player to captain England is Peter Shilton, who was aged 40 years and 292 days when he captained in his final international match against Italy on 7 July 1990.)
Alexander Morten, 41 years 113 days, 8 March 1873, 4–2 vs. Scotland
Last player to be captain in only international appearance
Claude Ashton, 24 October 1925, 0–0 vs. Ireland

==== Discipline ====
Most yellow cards
David Beckham, 19 (Note: David Beckham's total includes the two yellow cards which led to his red card against Austria in 2005.)
Most red cards
David Beckham and Wayne Rooney, 2 each

List of all England players sent off
As of 6 July 2026

| Player | Date | Against | Location | Result | Type of Game |
|---|---|---|---|---|---|
| Alan Mullery | 5 June 1968 | (Socialist Federal Republic of Yugoslavia) Yugoslavia | Stadio Artemio Franchi, Florence | 0–1 | 1968 European Championship |
| Alan Ball | 6 June 1973 | Poland | Silesian Stadium, Chorzów | 0–2 | 1974 World Cup Qualifier |
| Trevor Cherry | 12 June 1977 | Argentina | Buenos Aires | 1–1 | Friendly |
| Ray Wilkins | 6 June 1986 | Morocco | Estadio Tecnológico, Monterrey | 0–0 | 1986 World Cup |
| David Beckham | 30 June 1998 | Argentina | Stade Geoffroy-Guichard, Saint-Étienne | 2–2 (Note: England lost on penalties) | 1998 World Cup |
| Paul Ince (Note: Paul Ince's red card meant that players had been sent off in two consecutive England internationals for the first time.) | 5 September 1998 | Sweden | Råsunda Stadium, Solna | 1–2 | 2000 European Championship Qualifier |
| Paul Scholes | 5 June 1999 | Sweden | Wembley Stadium, London | 0–0 | 2000 European Championship Qualifier |
| David Batty (Note: David Batty is the only England player to have been sent off on his final international appearance.) | 8 September 1999 | Poland | Polish Army Stadium, Warsaw | 0–0 | 2000 European Championship Qualifier |
| Alan Smith | 16 October 2002 | (North Macedonia) Macedonia | St Mary's Stadium, Southampton | 2–2 | 2004 European Championship Qualifier |
| David Beckham (Note: With this red card, David Beckham became the first player to be sent off twice while playing for England.) | 8 October 2005 | Austria | Old Trafford, Manchester | 1–0 | 2006 World Cup Qualifier |
| Wayne Rooney | 1 July 2006 | Portugal | Veltins-Arena, Gelsenkirchen | 0–0 | 2006 World Cup |
| Robert Green (Note: Robert Green was the first goalkeeper to be sent off while playing for England.) | 10 October 2009 | Ukraine | Dnipro-Arena, Dnipropetrovsk | 0–1 | 2010 World Cup Qualifier |
| Wayne Rooney | 7 October 2011 | Montenegro | Podgorica City Stadium, Podgorica | 2–2 | 2012 European Championship Qualifier |
| Steven Gerrard | 11 September 2012 | Ukraine | Wembley Stadium, London | 1–1 | 2014 World Cup Qualifier |
| Raheem Sterling | 4 June 2014 | Ecuador | Sun Life Stadium, Miami | 2–2 | Friendly |
| Kyle Walker | 5 September 2020 | Iceland | Laugardalsvöllur, Reykjavík | 1–0 | 2020–21 UEFA Nations League |
| Harry Maguire (Note: Harry Maguire's and Reece James' red cards mark the first time England had two players sent off in the same game.) | 14 October 2020 | Denmark | Wembley Stadium, London | 0–1 | 2020–21 UEFA Nations League |
| Reece James (Note: Together with Lauren James's red card for the England women on 7 August 2023, the Jameses are the only pair of siblings to both be sent off for England.) | 14 October 2020 | Denmark | Wembley Stadium, London | 0–1 | 2020–21 UEFA Nations League |
| John Stones | 14 June 2022 | Hungary | Molineux, Wolverhampton | 0–4 | 2022–23 UEFA Nations League |
| Luke Shaw | 23 March 2023 | Italy | Stadio Diego Armando Maradona, Naples | 2–1 | 2024 European Championship Qualifier |
| Jarell Quansah | 5 July 2026 | Mexico | Estadio Azteca, Mexico City, Mexico | 3-2 | 2026 FIFA World Cup |

=== Manager records ===
England Manager Performance at Major Tournaments

| Rank | Manager | Winners | Runners-up | Semi-Finalists | Quarter-Finalists | Top 8 Finishes |
|---|---|---|---|---|---|---|
| 1 | Alf Ramsey | 1 (1966) | 0 | 1 (1968) | 1 (1970) | 3 |
| 2 | Gareth Southgate | 0 | 2 (2020, 2024) | 1 (2018) | 1 (2022) | 4 |
| 3 | Bobby Robson | 0 | 0 | 1 (1990) | 1 (1986) | 2 |
| 4 | Thomas Tuchel | 0 | 0 | 1 (2026) | 0 | 1 |
| 5 | Terry Venables | 0 | 0 | 1 (1996) | 0 | 1 |
| 6 | Sven-Göran Eriksson | 0 | 0 | 0 | 3 (2002, 2004, 2006) | 3 |
| 7 | Walter Winterbottom | 0 | 0 | 0 | 2 (1954, 1962) | 2 |
| 8 | Roy Hodgson | 0 | 0 | 0 | 1 (2012) | 1 |

Best Performance Champions Runners-up Semi-Finalists

== Team records ==
Biggest victory
13–0 vs. Ireland, 18 February 1882
Heaviest defeat
1–7 vs. Hungary, 23 May 1954
Biggest home victory
13–2 vs. Ireland, 18 February 1899
Heaviest home defeat
1–6 vs. Scotland, 12 March 1881
Biggest victory at the World Cup finals
6–1 vs. Panama, 24 June 2018
Heaviest defeat at the World Cup finals
1–4 vs. Germany, 27 June 2010
Biggest victory at the European Championship finals
4–0 vs. Ukraine, 3 July 2021
Heaviest defeat at the European Championship finals
1–3 vs. Netherlands, 15 June 1988
1–3 vs. Soviet Union, 18 June 1988
Biggest victory in a competitive international (World Cup, European Championship, Nations League and qualifiers)
10–0 vs. San Marino, 15 November 2021 (Note: World Cup qualifier.)
Heaviest defeat in a competitive international (World Cup, European Championship, Nations League and qualifiers)
0–4 vs. Hungary, 14 June 2022 (Note: Nations League qualifier.)
First defeat to a non-British team
3–4 vs. Spain, 15 May 1929
First defeat to a non-British team on home soil
0–2 vs. Republic of Ireland, 21 September 1949
First defeat to a non-European team
0–1 vs. United States, 29 June 1950
Most consecutive victories
10, 6 June 1908 vs. Austria – 1 June 1909 vs. Austria
Most consecutive victories in competitive internationals (World Cup, European Championship and qualifiers)
10, 7 September 2014 vs. Switzerland – 12 October 2015 vs. Lithuania (Note: These games comprised the qualifying competition for the 2016 European Championship)
Most consecutive matches without defeat
22, 18 November 2020 vs. Iceland – 29 March 2022 vs. Ivory Coast
Most consecutive defeats
3, Achieved on seven occasions, most recently 11 July 2018 vs. Croatia – 8 September 2018 vs. Spain (Note: These games included England's participation in the semi-finals and third place play-off of the 2018 World Cup.)
Most consecutive matches without victory
7, 11 May 1958 vs. Yugoslavia – 4 October 1958 vs. Northern Ireland (Note: These games included England's participation in the 1958 World Cup.)
Most consecutive draws
4, Achieved on three occasions, most recently 7 June 1989 vs. Denmark – 15 November 1989 vs. Italy
Most consecutive matches without a draw (Note: The post-war record is 19, 19 October 1948 vs. Northern Ireland – 15 November 1950 vs. Wales. These games included England's participation in the 1950 World Cup.)
21, 16 May 1936 vs. Austria – 15 April 1939 vs. Scotland
Most consecutive matches scoring (Note: The post-war record is 18, 7 October 1950 vs. Northern Ireland – 18 April 1953 vs. Scotland.)
52, 17 March 1884 vs. Wales – 30 March 1901 vs. Scotland
Most consecutive matches without scoring
4, 29 April 1981 vs. Romania – 23 May 1981 vs. Scotland
Most consecutive matches conceding a goal
13, 6 May 1959 vs. Italy – 8 October 1960 vs. Northern Ireland
Most consecutive matches without conceding a goal
7, 2 June 2021 vs. Austria – 3 July 2021 vs. Ukraine

== Miscellaneous ==
First substitute
Jimmy Mullen (for Jackie Milburn), 18 May 1950, 4–1 vs. Belgium
Players appearing both before and after World War II
Raich Carter, Tommy Lawton, Stanley Matthews
Club providing the most players in a single match
Starting XI – Arsenal, 7, 14 November 1934 vs. Italy
Including substitutes – Manchester United, 7, 28 March 2001 vs. Albania
Major tournament – Liverpool, 6, 19 June 2014 vs. Uruguay
Club providing the most players in a major tournament squad
Liverpool, 6, 1980 European Championships, 2012 European Championships, 2014 World Cup
Last amateur to appear
Bernard Joy, 9 May 1936, 2–3 vs. Belgium
Most penalty misses
Harry Kane, 4
Father and son both capped
George Eastham, Sr. (1 cap, 1935) and George Eastham (19 caps, 1963–1966)
Brian Clough (2 caps, 1959) and Nigel Clough (14 caps, 1989–1993)
Frank Lampard Sr. (2 caps, 1972–1980) and Frank Lampard (106 caps, 1999–2014)
Ian Wright (33 caps, 1991–1998) and Shaun Wright-Phillips (36 caps, 2004–2010)
Mark Chamberlain (8 caps, 1982–1984) and Alex Oxlade-Chamberlain (35 caps, 2012–2019)
Grandfather and grandson both capped
Bill Jones, (2 caps, 1950) and Rob Jones (8 caps, 1992–1995)
Great-great-grandfather and great-great-grandson both capped
Billy Garraty, (1 cap, 1903) and Jack Grealish, (39 caps, 2020–)
Most clubs represented by one player in an England career
Peter Shilton, 5, Leicester City, Stoke City, Nottingham Forest, Southampton and Derby County, 25 November 1970 – 7 July 1990
Dave Watson, 5, Sunderland, Manchester City, Werder Bremen, Southampton and Stoke City, 3 April 1974 – 2 June 1982
David Platt, 5, Aston Villa, Bari, Juventus, Sampdoria and Arsenal, 15 November 1989 – 26 June 1996
David James, 5, Liverpool, Aston Villa, West Ham United, Manchester City and Portsmouth, 29 March 1997 – 27 June 2010
Emile Heskey, 5, Leicester City, Liverpool, Birmingham City, Wigan Athletic and Aston Villa, 28 April 1999 – 27 June 2010
Scott Parker, 5, Charlton Athletic, Chelsea, Newcastle United, West Ham United and Tottenham Hotspur, 16 November 2003 – 22 March 2013
Jordan Henderson, 5, Sunderland, Liverpool, Al-Ettifaq, Ajax and Brentford, 17 November 2010 – 9 October 2025
England players who later became manager/head coach
Alf Ramsey, 32 appearances as a player, 1948–1953, 113 matches as manager, 1963–1974
Joe Mercer, 5 appearances as a player, 1938–1939, 7 matches as manager, 1974 (Note: Joe Mercer was appointed on a temporary basis between the dismissal of Alf Ramsey and the appointment of Don Revie.)
Don Revie, 6 appearances as a player, 1954–1956, 29 matches as manager, 1974–1977
Bobby Robson, 20 appearances as a player, 1957–1962, 95 matches as manager, 1982–1990
Terry Venables, 2 appearances as a player, 1964, 23 matches as head coach, 1994–1996
Glenn Hoddle, 53 appearances as a player, 1979–1988, 28 matches as manager, 1996–1999
Kevin Keegan, 63 appearances as a player, 1972–1982, 18 matches as manager, 1999–2000
Peter Taylor, 4 appearances as a player, 1976, 1 match as manager, 2000 (Note: Peter Taylor was appointed on a temporary basis between the resignation of Kevin Keegan and the appointment of Sven-Göran Eriksson.)
Stuart Pearce, 78 appearances as a player, 1987–1999, 1 match as manager, 2012 (Note: Stuart Pearce was appointed on a temporary basis between the resignation of Fabio Capello and the appointment of Roy Hodgson.)
Gareth Southgate, 57 appearances as a player, 1995–2004, 102 matches as manager, 2016–2024

== See also ==
- England women's national football team records and statistics

== General references ==
Goodwin, C.; Isherwood, G.; Young, P. "England Football Online".

Naylor, D. "englandstats.com - England International Database".

"11v11.com - Home of football statistics and history". Association of Football Statisticians.
