= Roy Cutler =

English cricketer and footballer

Personal information
- Full name: Roy William Cutler
- Born: 28 March 1945 (age 81); West Hartlepool, County Durham, England
- Batting: Right-handed
- Bowling: Right-arm medium-fast

Domestic team information
- Years: Team
- 1965–1966: Cambridge University

Career statistics
Competition	First-class
Matches	6
Runs scored	79
Batting average	7.18
100s/50s	–/–
Top score	18
Balls bowled	714
Wickets	9
Bowling average	37.88
5 wickets in innings	1
10 wickets in match	–
Best bowling	5/39
Catches/stumpings	1/–
- Source: Cricinfo, 16 September 2020

Roy William Cutler (born 28 March 1945) is an English former first-class cricketer and footballer.

Cutler was born at West Hartlepool in March 1945. He later studied at Jesus College, Cambridge. While studying at Cambridge, he played first-class cricket for Cambridge University in 1965–66, making six appearances. Playing as a right-arm medium-fast bowler, he took 9 wickets at an average of 37.88. He took one five wicket haul, with figures of 5 for 39 against Glamorgan in 1965. In addition to playing cricket for the university, Cutler also played football as a forward for Cambridge University A.F.C., for which he gained a blue.

Cutler continued to play football after he had graduated from Cambridge, playing for Hitchin Town, Enfield, Stevenage and Corinthian-Casuals.
