= John Vaughn (disambiguation) =

John Vaughn (born 1984) is an American former football placekicker.

John Vaughn or Jon Vaughn is also the name of:

- Jon Vaughn (born 1970), American former football running back
- John Vaughn (Franciscan) (1928–2016)
- John C. Vaughn (1824–1875), American officer for the Confederate Army
- Jack Vaughn (1920–2012), director of the New Brunswick Peace Corps
- Jack Vaughn Jr. (born 1974), American record and television producer
- Jon Vaughn (pole vaulter) (born 1948), American pole vaulter, winner of the 1968 pole vault at the NCAA Division I Outdoor Track and Field Championships

== See also ==
- John Vaughan (disambiguation)
