= Thelwell Pike =

English footballer

Personal information
- Full name: Thelwell Mather Pike
- Date of birth: 17 November 1866
- Place of birth: Andover, England
- Date of death: 21 July 1957 (aged 90)
- Position: Winger

Senior career*
Years	Team	Apps	(Gls)
- Cambridge University
- Brentwood/Crusaders
- Swifts
- Thanet Wanderers
1886–1891	Corinthian		

International career
1886	England	1	(0)
- * Club domestic league appearances and goals

Thelwell Mather Pike (17 November 1866 – 21 July 1957) was an English footballer who earned one cap for the national team in 1886. Pike played club football for Cambridge University, Brentwood (later known as Crusaders), Swifts, Thanet Wanderers and Corinthian.

Pike was born in Andover, Hampshire and educated at Malvern College, playing football for the school in 1884 and 1885, before attending Cambridge University, where he earned a blue in 1886 and 1888.

He made his solitary England appearance on 13 March 1886, in a 6–1 victory over Ireland. In the match at Ballynafeigh Park, Belfast, Pike's fellow Cantabrians, Ralph Squire and Benjamin Spilsbury played at centre-half and inside-left respectively, with Spilsbury scoring four of England's goals.

After leaving the university, Pike played for several clubs, including Crusaders, Brentwood, Swifts and Thanet Wanderers, although it was with the Corinthian club that he was most closely associated, playing 21 games for them between 1886 and 1891.

Pike was also a noted cricketer, playing for Worcestershire, then a minor county, between 1886 and 1895.

A few years later, he became the headmaster of Weybridge Preparatory School between 1897 and 1906, before moving to Thanet School in Margate, where he remained until his retirement.

The 1881 Census calls him Mather Pike.
