= Thomas Bryan (Welsh footballer) =

Welsh footballer

Personal information
- Date of birth: 1866
- Position: Forward

Senior career*
Years	Team	Apps	(Gls)
1885-1886	Oswestry FC		

International career
1885-1886	Wales MNT	2	(1)
- * Club domestic league appearances and goals

Thomas Bryan (born 1866) was a Welsh international footballer of the 19th century. He played twice for Wales in the 1885-86 British Home Championship, scoring one goal.
