= Leonard Lindley =

English cricketer and footballer

Personal information
- Full name: Leonard Oscroft Lindley
- Born: 22 February 1861; Nottingham, Nottinghamshire, England
- Died: 3 May 1915 (aged 54); Kings Norton, Worcestershire, England
- Batting: Unknown
- Relatives: Tinsley Lindley (brother)

Career statistics
Competition	First-class
Matches	2
Runs scored	28
Batting average	9.33
100s/50s	–/–
Top score	22
Catches/stumpings	2/–
- Source: Cricinfo, 8 September 2019

Leonard Oscroft Lindley (22 February 1861 – 3 May 1915) was an English first-class cricketer and footballer.

The son of Leonard Lindley, who was a lace dresser and Mayor of Nottingham in 1882, he was born at Nottingham in February 1861 and was educated at Nottingham High School. He played football mostly as a winger for Nottingham Forest, debuting in 1878 against Spital United. He played for Nottingham Forest until 1881. Lindley also played first-class cricket on two occasions for the North of England in the North v South fixtures of 1884 and 1886, with both matches played at Lord's. He scored 28 runs in his two matches, with a high score of 22. He later became a partner in the family lace dressing business Lindley and Lindley, until its dissolution in 1897. Lindley died in May 1915 at Kings Norton, Worcestershire. His brother, Tinsley Lindley, was an international footballer and first-class cricketer.
