= Francis Pawson =

English footballer

Personal information
- Full name: Francis William Pawson
- Date of birth: 6 April 1861
- Place of birth: Sheffield, England
- Date of death: 4 July 1921 (aged 60)
- Position: Forward

Senior career*
| Years | Team | Apps | (Gls) |
- Cambridge University
| 1892–1893 | Eastbourne | | |

International career
| 1883–1885 | England | 2 | (1) |
- * Club domestic league appearances and goals

Francis William Pawson (6 April 1861 – 4 July 1921) was an English footballer who earned two caps for the national team between 1883 and 1885, scoring one goal. Pawson played club football for Cambridge University. He also spent a season at Eastbourne between 1892 and 1893.

His grandson was the comedian Tim Brooke-Taylor.
