= George Brann =

English cricketer and footballer (1865–1954)

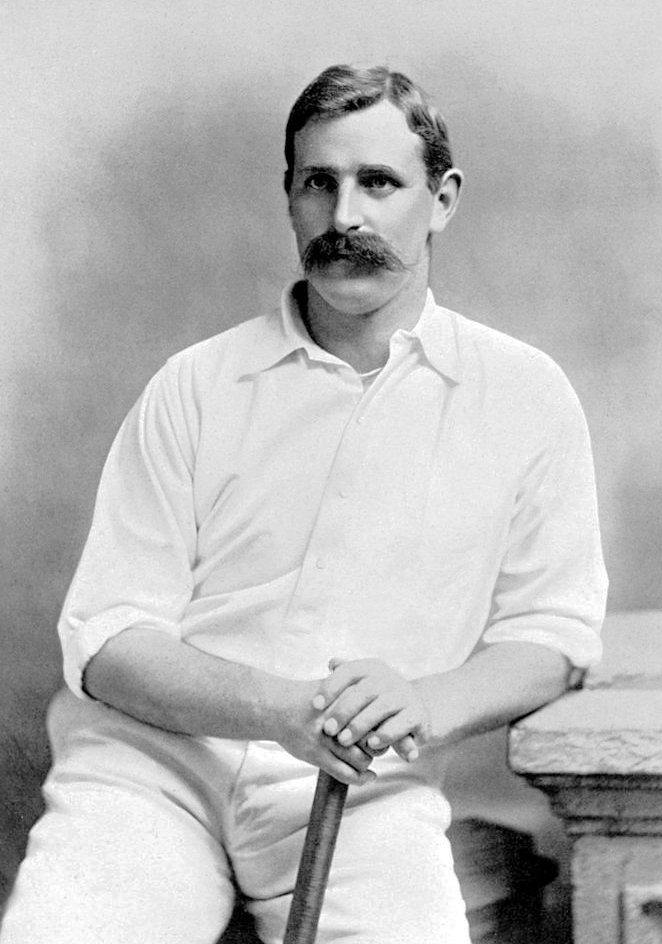

Personal information
- Full name: George Brann
- Date of birth: 23 April 1865
- Place of birth: Eastbourne, England
- Date of death: 14 June 1954 (aged 89)
- Place of death: Surbiton, England
- Position: Forward

Youth career
- Ardingly College

Senior career*
Years	Team	Apps	(Gls)
- Swifts/Slough
1885–1893	Corinthian	0	(0)

International career
1886–1891	England	3	(1)
- * Club domestic league appearances and goals

George Brann (23 April 1865 – 14 June 1954) was an English amateur cricketer and footballer who had a long career with Sussex County Cricket Club at the end of the 19th century, and played three matches for the England national football team.

== Education ==
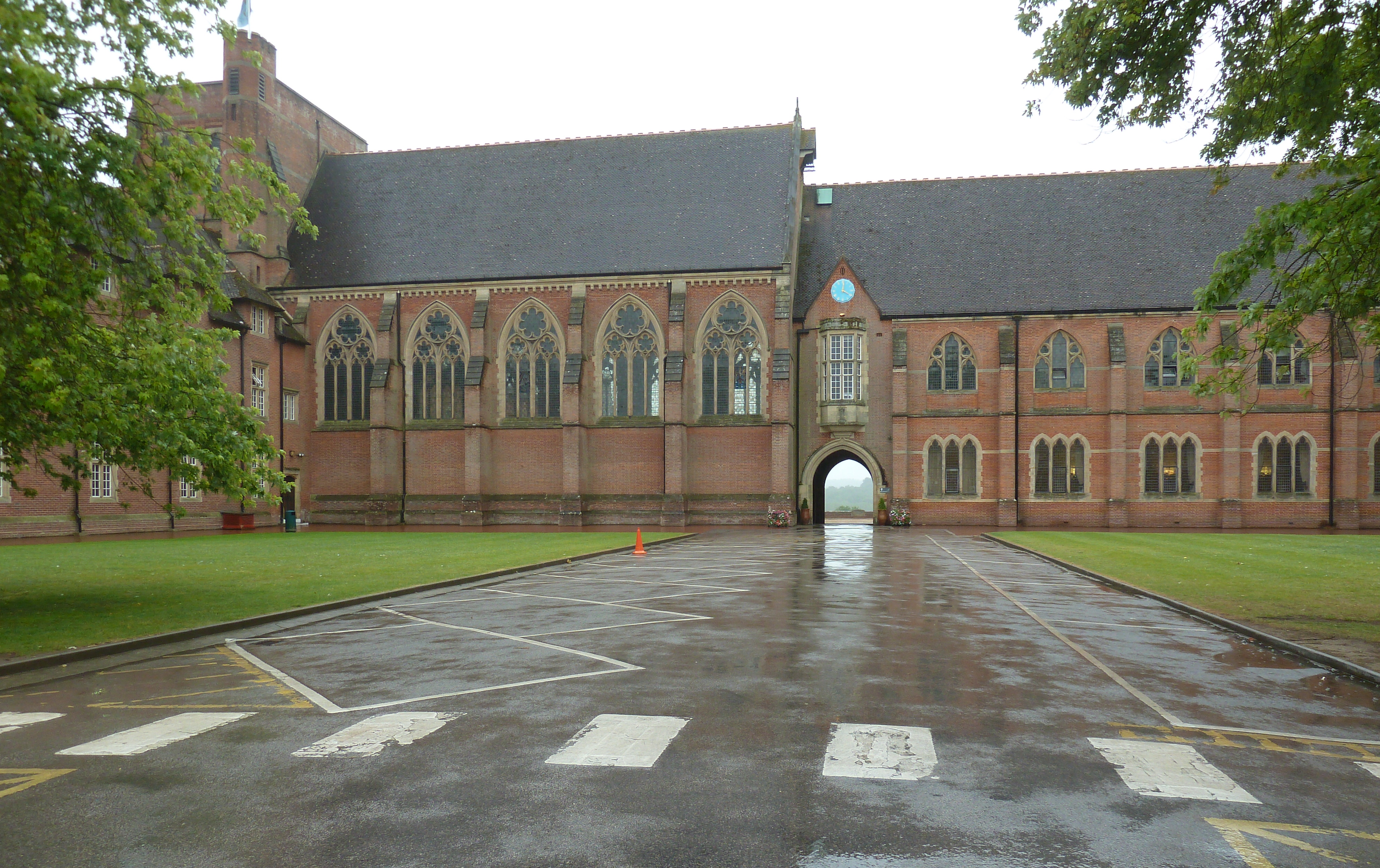
Ardingly College

Brann was born in Eastbourne, East Sussex and was educated at Ardingly College, near Haywards Heath, West Sussex, where he spent ten years and represented the school at football.

== Football career ==
After leaving school he joined the Swifts based in Slough, who in 1890 merged with Slough Albion and Young Men's Friendly Society to form a new club, Slough F.C., who later became Slough Town.

Being an amateur, Brann was free to play for more than one club, and he joined the famous amateur club Corinthian in 1885. He made his first appearance for them in a 3–1 defeat against Preston North End on 28 November 1885. In the 1885–86 season he played eight times for Corinthian, in all five forward positions, scoring three goals.

In the 1885–86 FA Cup tournament, Brann was part of the Swifts team, together with Charlie & Arthur Bambridge who reached the sixth round stage, where they were eliminated by the Cup holders Blackburn Rovers.

His first England appearance came at Cathkin Park, Glasgow in a 1–1 draw against Scotland on 27 March 1886 in the British Home Championship. England's goal was scored by fellow Corinthian Tinsley Lindley. Brann was retained for the next match against Wales two days later, and scored in a 3–1 victory.

His Corinthian appearances over the next few seasons were fairly infrequent, and he ended his career in 1893, having made 32 appearances, with eight goals.

He made his third, and final, England appearance against Wales on 7 March 1891 when he played on the right wing alongside professionals including Johnny Goodall, Jack Southworth, Alf Milward and Edgar Chadwick. England were too strong for the Welsh and won 4–1, with each of the other forwards scoring.

== Cricket career ==
George Brann
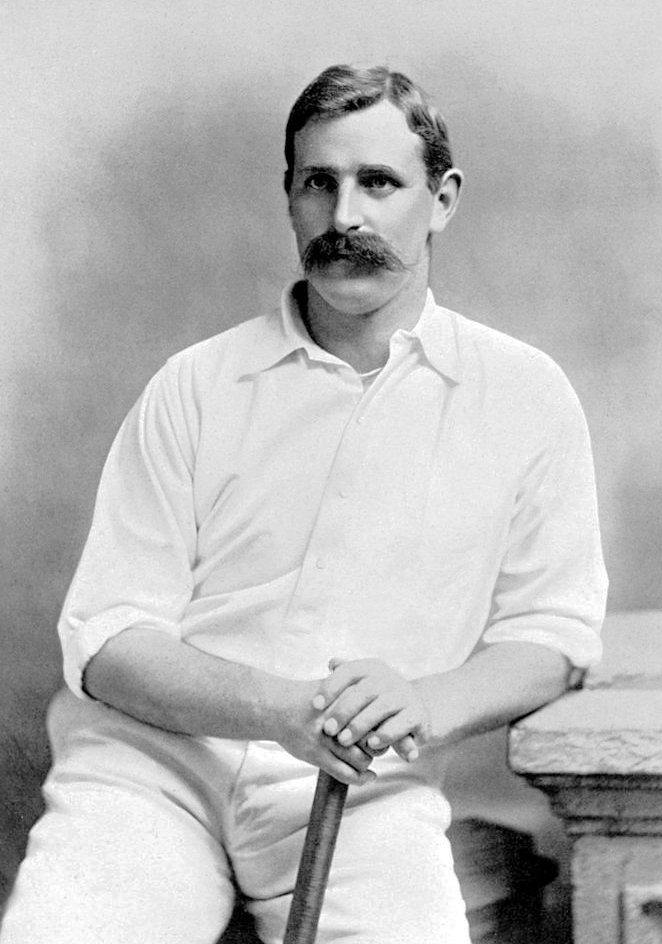

Cricket information
- Batting: Right-handed
- Bowling: Right-arm fast

Career statistics
Competition	First-class
Matches	291
Runs scored	11,205
Batting average	25.69
100s/50s	25/43
Top score	161
Balls bowled	5,857
Wickets	69
Bowling average	44.31
5 wickets in innings	1
10 wickets in match	0
Best bowling	5/73
Catches/stumpings	145/2
- Source: CricketArchive, 10 April 2023

He made his debut for Sussex against Hampshire in May 1883 although he made little impact scoring a duck as Sussex won by an innings and 42 runs but his career really began in 1885.

His highest first-class score was 161 against Cambridge University at Hove in 1899, although he did score 219 against Hampshire in a non-first-class match in June 1886. In 1899 he and C. B. Fry opened the two Sussex innings against Middlesex at Lord's with partnerships of 135 and 148.

In 1892 he enjoyed what was then the rare distinction of scoring two centuries in a match – 105 and 101 against Kent. This had only been achieved previously by W. G. Grace (three times) and William Lambert, also of Sussex.

Brann went to Australia in 1887–88 as a member of Arthur Shrewsbury's Team, visited South Africa under Walter Read in 1891–92 and America in 1899 when K. S. Ranjitsinhji was captain.

According to his obituary in Wisden, he was "originally a very free batsman and powerful hitter, [but] forsook his dashing methods during his last few years of county cricket, [and] although becoming a far more watchful type of batsman he continued to make many runs".

His last significant season was 1904, although his final first-class match for Sussex was against Cambridge University in June 1905. In his first-class career, he scored a total of 11,205 runs at an average of 25.69, including twenty-five centuries for Sussex. Standing nearly six feet tall, he was also a fine fielder taking 145 catches during his career; as a fast bowler he claimed 69 wickets at an average of 44.31.

== Life outside sport ==
After retiring from cricket he became a good golfer and was secretary to the Home Park Golf Club in Surbiton for twenty years.

He was a career schoolteacher, teaching at his former school, Ardingly College.

He died at his home at Surbiton, Surrey, on 14 June 1954, aged 89.
