= Jack Vaughan =

Jack Vaughan may refer to:

- Jack Vaughan (rugby union), see Connemara RFC
- Jack Vaughan (American football), see Fog Bowl (American football)

== See also ==
- John Vaughan (disambiguation)
- Jack Vaughn, Peace Corps director
- Jack Vaughn, Jr., music and television executive
