= William McLeod (footballer) =

Scottish footballer

Personal information
- Date of birth: c. 1860
- Place of birth: Glasgow, Scotland
- Date of death: 8 November 1943 (aged 82–83)
- Position: Full back

Senior career*
Years	Team	Apps	(Gls)
- Cowlairs
- Aston Villa
- Queen's Park

International career
1886	Scotland	1	(0)
- * Club domestic league appearances and goals

William McLeod (c. 1860 – 8 November 1943) was a Scottish footballer who played as a full back.

== Career ==
Born in Glasgow, McLeod played club football for Cowlairs, Aston Villa and Queen's Park, and made one appearance for Scotland in 1886. He was later active as a referee.
