= Teddy Leighton =

English footballer

Personal information
- Full name: John Edward Leighton
- Date of birth: 26 March 1865
- Place of birth: Nottingham, England
- Date of death: 15 April 1944 (aged 79)
- Place of death: Nottingham, England
- Position: Outside forward

Senior career*
Years	Team	Apps	(Gls)
1884–1888	Nottingham Forest	0	(0)
1885–1889	Corinthian	0	(0)

International career
1886	England	1	(0)
- * Club domestic league appearances and goals

John Edward Leighton (26 March 1865 – 15 April 1944) was an English amateur footballer who played on the wing for Nottingham Forest and the Corinthians in the 1880s and made one appearance for England in 1886.

== Football career ==
Leighton was born in Nottingham and after playing schoolboy and junior football in the town, he joined Nottingham Forest in 1884. He joined Forest prior to the advent of the Football League and was thus restricted to friendly and cup matches. Leighton scored a goal in the 4–1 victory over local rivals, Notts Olympic in the second round of the FA Cup in November 1885; the following year he scored twice against Grimsby Town in the second round, repeating this in November 1887 against Mellors Ltd.

His England call-up came on 13 March 1886 when, along with his Nottingham Forest teammate Tinsley Lindley, he was one of eight new caps selected to play against Ireland at Ballynafeigh Park, Belfast. England "totally dominated" the match as Benjamin Spilsbury scored four goals in a 6–1 victory.

Leighton also played for the Corinthians between 1885 and 1889, during which time he made seven appearances.

== Life outside football ==
By profession, Leighton was a wholesale stationer and paper merchant in Nottingham. He was a supporter of Nottingham Forest and watched most of their matches at the City Ground at all levels; he collapsed and died at the City Ground on 15 April 1944, aged 79.
