= John Cameron (Rangers footballer) =

Scottish footballer

John Cameron was a Scottish footballer, who played for Govan, Renfrew, Rangers and Scotland.
