= John Vaughan (East India Company officer) =

British officer (1778–1830)

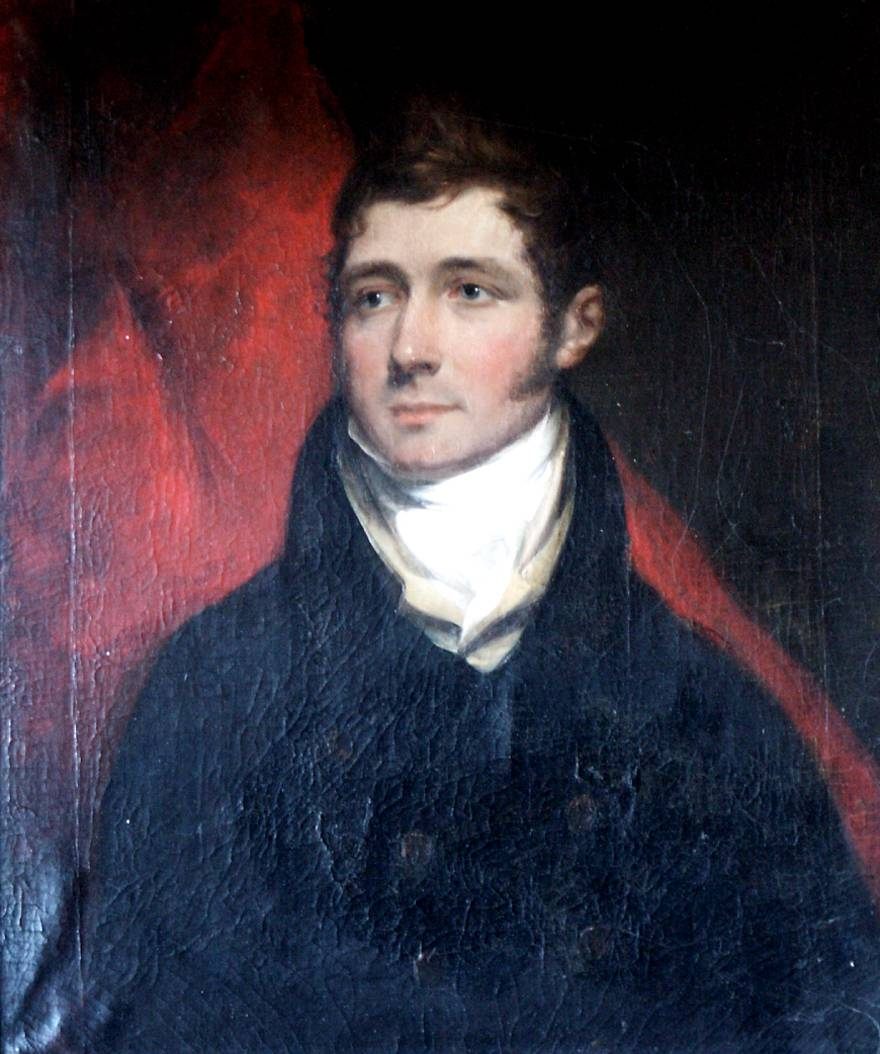
- Born: 1778; Gloucestershire
- Died: 1 November 1830 (aged 52)
- Burial place: Calcutta South Park Street Burial Ground
- Military career
- Allegiance: United Kingdom; East India Company
- Branch: Bengal Army
- Service years: 1795–1830
- Rank: Colonel
- Units: 2nd Regt Bengal Native Infantry; 21st Regt Bengal Native Infantry
- Commands: 1st Bn. 4th Reg. Bengal N. I. Regimental Lt-Col. 18th Reg. Bengal N. I. Col. 37th Reg. Bengal N.I.
- Other work: Assistant Adjutant General; Town and Fort Major, Fort William, India

Colonel John Vaughan (1778–1830) was a senior British officer in the service of the Honourable East India Company’s Army. Through his military career he saw active service on the Fourth Anglo-Mysore War, Second Anglo-Maratha War and Third Anglo-Maratha War.

== Early life ==
Vaughan was born in Gloucestershire, England, in 1778. At the age of seventeen he departed to India, as he obtained a cadetship to serve in the East India Company’s Bengal Army.

== Military career ==
In 1797 he obtained a commission as lieutenant in the 2nd Regiment of Native Infantry. His regiment was one of the few Bengal Army units involved in the campaigns during the Fourth Anglo-Mysore War (1798–1799) until the siege and battle of Seringapatam.

At the outbreak of the Second Anglo-Maratha War, in 1803, Lieutenant John Vaughan received orders to raise a battalion of sepoys in the area of Fatehgarh for the purpose of adding a new regiment to the establishment. This battalion would be the 1st Battalion of the newly created 21st Bengal Native Infantry, posted in the 2nd Infantry Brigade of Lord Lake’s army during the whole Maratha War.

At the departure of the commander in chief, General Lord Gerard Lake to England in 1807, his Excellency recognised the role of the 21st N. I. with a letter were stated "I shall ever remain grateful for the important services, which in the course of the war, were rendered by the officers of the 21st regiment of Native Infantry".

On 19 November 1807, Capt-Lieutenant Vaughan was promoted to the rank of captain in the 21st N.I. In April 1815, at the final period of the Napoleonic Wars, the British Sovereign appointed some senior general officers serving in India Knight Commander of the Order of the Bath. At the end of 1815, Captain Vaughan is intrusted to bring from London the insignias intended of the Knights Commander of the Order of the Bath resident in India to Calcutta on board the H. C. Ship Carnatic.

In the Third Anglo-Maratha War (1817–1819), Captain Vaughan serves in the General Staff of the Bengal Army as Assistant Adjutant General. In this capacity he accompanied Francis Rawdon-Hastings, 1st Marquess of Hastings, then Governor-General and commander in chief, in the Centre Division for the whole campaign of the Grand Army. In the course of war he was promoted to the rank of major on 1 February 1818.

On 15 February 1822, Major John Vaughan was appointed to the staff position of Town and Fort Major of Fort William in Calcutta and will only vacate the appointment with his death in 1830.

Next year, from 13 January 1823 to 1 August, Vaughan was supernumerary Aide-de-Camp to the acting Governor-General, John Adam. When Lord Amherst, the new Governor-General approached Calcutta by ship on 30 July 1823, Major Vaughan was sent on board with a 4 member’s deputation to greet and escort him to Calcutta on the next day in order to make the solemn oaths as Governor-General of Fort William.

On 11 July 1823, Vaughan was promoted to lieutenant-colonel and given command of the 1st Battalion, 4th Reg. Native Infantry. Following the 1824 Bengal Army infantry regiments reorganization, Lt-Col. Vaughan was posted to be the Lieutenant-Colonel of the 18th Regiment N. I, on 11 June. 15 November 1824, Lt-Col. Vaughan was nominated a member of the Special Court of Enquiry ordered by the Government of India under instruction of the commander in chief, to investigate the causes and deal with the first sepoy mutiny at Barrackpore (2 Nov. 1824).

In 1828, Vaughan was promoted to Lieutenant-Colonel Commandant, 8 February, and again chosen, on 13 March, to be supernumerary Aide-de-Camp to the acting Governor-General, now William Butterworth Bayley (later chairman of the British East India Company).

On 2 April 1828 and until his death in 1830, John Vaughan assumed the command of 37th Regiment of Native Infantry. At the same year, Vaughan was appointed Aide-de-Camp to the new Governor-General of India, General Lord William Bentinck on 26 September.

As A.D.C. to the Governor General, Vaughan accompanied Lord William Bentinck in his visit to the Presidency of Penang, Malacca and Singapore in early 1829. On 5 June, Lt-Col. Commandant Vaughan was promoted to colonel.

In July 1830, Colonel Vaughan accompanied General the Earl of Dalhousie, commander in chief Bengal Army, in his voyage to China.

On 1 November 1830, Colonel Vaughan, at the age of 52 years, died in Fort William, India, at Calcutta.

== Personal life ==
Colonel John Vaughan was a bachelor all his life. He was brother of late Capt. Thomas Vaughan Royal North Gloucester Militia and uncle of Amelia Vaughan Jones Woollett. At 4 May 1825, Lt. Colonel Vaughan was elected as member of the Asiatic Society of Calcutta.

== Death ==
His obituary on The Asiatic Journal reads:

"On 1 November, at Calcutta, Colonel Vaughan, of the 37th reg. N. I., Town and Fort Major of Fort William, and Aide-de-Camp to the Governor General."

== Sources ==
- A sketch of the services of the Bengal native army, to the year 1895, Francis Gordon Cardew, Office of the Adjutant General, India 1903
- Alphabetical list of the officers of the Bengal army; with the dates of their respective promotion, retirement, resignation, or death whether in India or in Europe from the year 1760 to the year 1834 inclusive, corrected to 30 September 1837, Dodwell, Edward; Miles, James Samuel, London, Longman, Orme, Brown and co., London 1838
- Memoir of the life and military services of Viscount Lake, baron Lake of Delhi and Laswaree, 1744–1808, by Hugh Wodehouse Pearse, W. Blackwood and sons, 1908
- The Asiatic Annual Register, [...] for 1807, Vol. 9, London 1809
- The Asiatic Journal and Monthly Miscellany/Register, Vol. 1, Jan-June 1816, London 1816
- The Asiatic Journal and Monthly Miscellany/Register, Vol. 5, Jan-June 1818, London 1818
- The Asiatic Journal and Monthly Miscellany/Register, Vol. 6, June-Dec 1818, London 1818
- The Asiatic Journal and Monthly Miscellany/Register, Vol. 13, Jan-June 1822, London 1822
- The Asiatic Journal and Monthly Miscellany/Register, Vol. 16, July-Dec 1823, London 1823
- The Asiatic Journal and Monthly Miscellany/Register, Vol. 20, July-Dec 1825, London 1825
- The Asiatic Journal and Monthly Miscellany/Register, Vol. 28, July-Dec 1829, London 1825
- The Asiatic Journal and Monthly Miscellany/Register, Vol. 5, New Series, May-Aug 1831, London 1831
- The Calcutta Magazine and monthly register, Volumes 7-9, 1830, Calcutta, 1830
- Oriental Herald and Colonial Review, Edited by J. S. Buckingham, Vol. 1, Jan-April 1824, London 1824
- Oriental Herald and Colonial Review, Edited by J. S. Buckingham, Vol. 2, May-Aug 1824, London 1824
- Oriental Herald and Colonial Review, Edited by J. S. Buckingham, Vol. 4, Jan-March 1825, London 1825
- Oriental Herald and Colonial Review, Edited by J. S. Buckingham, Vol. 9, April–June, 1826, London 1826
- Oriental Herald and Colonial Review, Edited by J. S. Buckingham, Vol. 18, July-Sept 1828, London 1828
- Oriental Herald and Colonial Review, Edited by J. S. Buckingham, Vol. 19, Oct-Dec 1828, London 1828
- Oriental Herald and Colonial Review, Edited by J. S. Buckingham, Vol. 21, Apr-June, 1829, London 1829
- The Oriental magazine, and Calcutta review, Vol. 2, July-Dec 1823, Calcutta 1823
- Tulsi leaves and the Ganges water: the slogan of the first sepoy mutiny at Barrackpore 1824, Premansukumar Bandyopadhyay, K.P. Bagchi & Co., 2003
