= James Connor (Scottish footballer) =

Scottish footballer

Personal information
- Date of birth: 22 February 1861
- Place of birth: Airdrie, Scotland
- Date of death: 29 January 1899 (aged 37)
- Place of death: Hamilton, Scotland
- Position: Goalkeeper

Senior career*
Years	Team	Apps	(Gls)
1878–1893	Airdrieonians		
- → Queen's Park (guest)

International career
1886	Scotland	1	(0)
- * Club domestic league appearances and goals

James Connor (22 February 1861 – 29 January 1899) was a Scottish footballer who played for Airdrieonians, Queen's Park, Corinthian and Scotland. He had the distinction of being the goalkeeper who faced the first ever penalty kick in the history of football, awarded in a local cup tie on 6 June 1891 (four days after the rule was introduced by the International Football Association Board).
