= Robert Fleming (footballer) =

Scottish footballer

Personal information
- Date of birth: 11 March 1860
- Place of birth: Greenock, Scotland
- Position: Right winger

Senior career*
Years	Team	Apps	(Gls)
- Morton

International career
1886	Scotland	1	(0)
- * Club domestic league appearances and goals

Robert Fleming (born 11 March 1860) was a Scottish footballer who played as a right winger.

== Career ==
Born in Greenock, Fleming played for hometown club Morton, becoming their first ever international player when he represented Scotland in 1886.
