= Andrew Amos =

English footballer

Personal information
- Date of birth: 20 September 1863
- Place of birth: Southwark, England
- Date of death: 2 October 1931 (aged 68)
- Place of death: Rotherhithe, England
- Position: Half back

Senior career*
Years	Team	Apps	(Gls)
1883–1884	Cambridge University		
1884–1886	Old Carthusians		
1884–1889	Corinthian		
- Hitchin Town

International career
1885–1886	England	2	(1)
- * Club domestic league appearances and goals

The Reverend Andrew Amos MA (20 September 1863 – 2 October 1931) was an English amateur footballer who played for Cambridge University, Old Carthusians, Corinthian and Hitchin Town, as well as making two appearances for the England national side. He subsequently became an ordained minister in the Church of England

== Career ==
=== Education ===
Amos was born in Southwark, London and was educated at Charterhouse School, where he was a member of the school football team in 1882. He then went up to Clare College, Cambridge and was awarded his blue in 1884.

=== Football career ===
After graduating he played football for the Old Carthusians as well as joining the Corinthian amateur club which had been founded two years earlier. He joined Corinthian in time for their December 1884 tour of the north of England when they played seven matches against professional clubs in eight days. The first match of the tour was against the FA Cup holders, Blackburn Rovers and, according to Rob Cavallini in his History of the Corinthian Football Club, "what happened next was truly remarkable and firmly established the Corinthian FC as a major power in the football world (as) Corinthian FC simply overwhelmed the FA Cup holders at their own stadium 8–1." Amos played at centre half in this match and amongst the goalscorers was Tinsley Lindley with three goals. Amos played in five of the seven tour matches.

His England call up came, as an Old Carthusians player, for the Home International Championship match against Scotland on 21 March 1885 when Amos played at left-half in a 1–1 draw. His next international call-up came a year later against Wales. Until recently the second goal in this match was credited to Tinsley Lindley but a review of contemporary records revealed that Amos scored the goal, and this is now recognized by most current reference sources.

Amos continued to play for Corinthian until November 1889, and made 47 appearances. He subsequently played for Hitchin Town.

=== Ministry ===
Amos was ordained in 1887 and ministered in London from 1889 to October 1921, when he became Rector of Rotherhithe until his death in 1931.

He also served as a councillor on Bermondsey Borough Council and was later elected as an alderman.
