= George Somerville =

Scottish footballer

Personal information
- Date of birth: c. 1860
- Place of birth: Glasgow, Scotland
- Position: Forward

Senior career*
Years	Team	Apps	(Gls)
- Uddingston
- Rangers
- Queen's Park

International career
1886	Scotland	1	(1)
- * Club domestic league appearances and goals

George Somerville (born c. 1860) was a Scottish footballer who played as a forward.

== Career ==
Born in Glasgow, Somerville played club football for Uddingston, Rangers and Queen's Park, and made one appearance for Scotland in 1886, scoring on his international debut. He won the Scottish Cup with Queen's Park in 1885–86.
