= John Owen Vaughan =

Welsh footballer

John Vaughan
Personal information
- Date of birth: 1863
- Place of birth: Wales
- Date of death: 1952 (aged 88–89)

International career
Years	Team	Apps	(Gls)
1885–1886	Wales	4	(1)

John Vaughan (1863 – 1952) was a Welsh international footballer. He was part of the Wales national football team between 1885 and 1886, playing four matches and scoring one goal. He played his first match on 11 April 1885, against Ireland, and his last match on 10 April 1886, against Scotland.

== See also ==
- List of Wales international footballers (alphabetical)
