= Tinsley Lindley =

English footballer

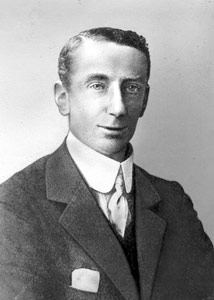

Personal information
- Date of birth: 27 October 1865
- Place of birth: Nottingham, England
- Date of death: 31 March 1940 (aged 74)
- Place of death: Nottingham, England
- Position: Centre forward

Senior career*
Years	Team	Apps	(Gls)
- Nottingham Forest

International career
1886–1891	England	13	(14)
- * Club domestic league appearances and goals

His Honour Tinsley Lindley, OBE (27 October 1865 – 31 March 1940) was an English footballer. He was described as "an ideal centre forward". He scored three goals in his debut aged 16 for Nottingham Forest. He was an amateur who did not wear football boots but scored 14 goals for England in 13 internationals Lindley was appointed an OBE in January 1918 for his work during World War I and in 1935 he was also awarded the King George V Silver Jubilee Medal. On retirement from football, Lindley turned his attention to his law practice, having been called to the Bar in 1899 while still playing.

== Early life ==
Lindley was the third son of Leonard Lindley who was a lace dresser and Mayor of Nottingham in 1882. The family lived in Clipstone Avenue, Nottingham and Lindley attended Nottingham High School between 1875 and 1883, where he first revealed his talent. His older brother, Leonard, was also a talented footballer and cricketer.

He later attended The Leys School in Cambridge, where he turned to rugby. From 1885 to 1888 he studied at Caius College, Cambridge and during this time played football for Cambridge University, and also for the Corinthians and Casuals. Lindley obtained not just a degree but he also achieved a Master of Law and LL.D law doctorate.

== Career ==
=== Club career ===
In 1888, Lindley returned to his home town to join Nottingham Forest. He was the youngest ever Nottingham Forest player and at age 16 he scored three goals on his debut on 17 February 1882. In one season, he scored 85 goals for Forest. During the 1889–90 season also played three matches for Nottingham rivals Notts County. Lindley was drafted in as cover for James Oswald in a match against Aston Villa. Villa were unhappy as he was not registered, they appealed and Notts were fined £5. Lindley appealed but the fine was increased to £30 and Notts were deducted two points.

In 1891 he also played for Crusaders and Swifts for a short while before guest-playing for Preston North End in a 4–1 defeat at Sunderland in 1892.

His many transfers were due primarily to his professional full-time career and the fact that he always remained an amateur, although many clubs wanted to hire him as a professional. He was the epitome of the 'Corinthian gentleman amateur' of his time, being an academic as well as a sportsman. He refused to wear ordinary football boots when playing, preferring walking brogues instead, declaring that boots marred his great sprinting speed.

=== International career ===
His England call-up came on 13 March 1886 when, along with his Nottingham Forest teammate Teddy Leighton, he was one of eight new caps selected to play against Ireland at Ballynafeigh Park, Belfast. Lindley scored as England "totally dominated" the match with Benjamin Spilsbury scoring four goals in a 6–1 victory.

It has been claimed that he holds the record for scoring in nine consecutive England matches between 13 March 1886 and 7 April 1888. However, there is no substance whatsoever to this claim, as this includes the match against Wales on 29 March 1886, in which all contemporary reports credit the goals to George Brann, Fred Dewhurst and Andrew Amos. He did, however, score in each of the next 6 consecutive games, which is still an England record (though note that Steve Bloomer scored in ten consecutive matches in which he played, and George Camsell in nine). In total he scored 14 international goals in just 13 games. He held the overall England goalscoring record from March 1888 when he equalled Charles Bambridge's tally of 11 until his final tally of 14 was overhauled by Steve Bloomer in 1898.

=== First-class cricket ===
Lindley played first-class cricket for Cambridge University and Nottinghamshire. He played ten games between 1885 and 1893 taking nearly a wicket a match as a round-arm right-armed slow to medium bowler. Lindley also averaged about ten runs per innings as a right-handed batsman.

=== Retirement from playing ===
On retirement from football, Lindley turned his full attention to his law practice, having been called to the Bar in 1899 while still playing. He also lectured in law at University of Nottingham and served as a County Court Judge on the Midland Circuit. Lindley also stayed loyal to Nottingham Forest, serving on the committee for several years. Lindley was also a President and Vice-President for local Amateur side Nottinghamshire FC who were formed in 1895. During World War I, Lindley served as the Chief Officer of the Nottingham Special Constabulary and as Deputy Director of the Nottinghamshire Territorial Association. He was awarded the OBE in 1918 for these services.

== Personal life ==
In 1896, Lindley married Constance Agnes Burnand, daughter of playwright F. C. Burnand. They had a daughter. The family lived at 14 Park Terrace in Nottingham.

== Death and legacy ==
Lindley died in Nottingham on 31 March 1940 aged 74.

In October 2013 a campaign was launched to raise £6,000 to provide a headstone on Lindley's grave in the Wilford Hill Cemetery near Nottingham. For an unknown reason, Lindley had been buried in an unmarked grave. As of 11 March 2014 £5850 had been raised. The memorial was unveiled on 31 March 2014.
