= Ralph Squire =

English footballer

Personal information
- Full name: Ralph Tyndall Squire
- Date of birth: 10 September 1863
- Place of birth: Marylebone, London, England
- Date of death: 22 August 1944 (aged 80)
- Position: Half back

Senior career*
Years	Team	Apps	(Gls)
- Cambridge University
- Corinthian

International career
1886	England	3	(0)
- * Club domestic league appearances and goals

Ralph Tyndall Squire (10 September 1863 – 22 August 1944) was an English footballer who earned three caps for the national team in 1886. Squire played club football for Cambridge University and Corinthian. Squire was educated at Westminster School and Trinity Hall, Cambridge.
