= Cambridge University A.F.C. =

Association football club in England

- Full name: Cambridge University Association Football Club
- Nickname: Blues
- Founded: 1856; 170 years ago (Note: Official university publications have claimed that the club was formed in 1856, being also recognised as such by The FA, which also awarded Cambridge a plaque in 2006 in honour of its "150th anniversary", giving its foundation date official recognition. Nevertheless, other sources state that the date of establishment of the Cambridge AFC is not clear enough, setting it between 1856 and 1866, but ranking it 2nd after the Sheffield F.C.)
- Ground: Grange Road Stadium/Fenner's Pitches, Cambridge, UK
- Capacity: 1,000
- Chairman: Dr. John Little
- Co-Presidents: Joseph Helm & Matthew Page (Men) Alissa Sattentau & Alexia Dengler (Women)
- Captain: Cai La Trobe Roberts (Men) Emilia Keavney & Abbie Hastie (Women)
- League: BUCS Midlands 1A
- 2023/24: Men's Blues: Midlands 1A. Women's Blues: Midlands 1A.
- Website: cuafc.com
Home colours

Cambridge University Association Football Club is an English football club representing the University of Cambridge. It is affiliated to the Football Association as the Cambridge University FA, and has representation on the FA Council equivalent to a County Football Association.

Official university publications have claimed that the club was formed in 1856, being also recognised as such by The Football Association. The FA awarded Cambridge a plaque in 2006 in honour of its "150th anniversary", giving its foundation date official recognition. Nevertheless, other sources state that the date of establishment of the Cambridge AFC is not clear enough, setting it between 1856 and 1866.

Cambridge currently plays in the Midland 1A of the British Universities and Colleges Sport (BUCS), the governing body for university sport in the United Kingdom. The club has also a women's football section, managed by an independent committee. The section has two teams playing in their respective divisions.

The club organizes the intercollegiate Cambridge University Association Football League.

== History ==
=== Background ===
Varieties of football have been played for many centuries, but until the mid-19th century, none of the modern codes of football existed. Many different games were played at English Public schools and all of these were known simply as "football". Naturally, children who had learnt these games at school now sought to play them at university, but this was problematic because they were used to so many different sets of rules.

Eton, Harrow and Winchester, in particular, developed codes which revolved around a roughly spherical ball being kicked along the ground (Weir, 2004). In 1846, H.C. Malden of Trinity combined these and other football games in the Cambridge Rules, one of the first codes of football, posting them on the trees around Parker's Piece. Debate on the rules continued, and in 1846, a revised set of Cambridge Rules were created. Some records (see Harvey) cite this as the foundation date of the club.

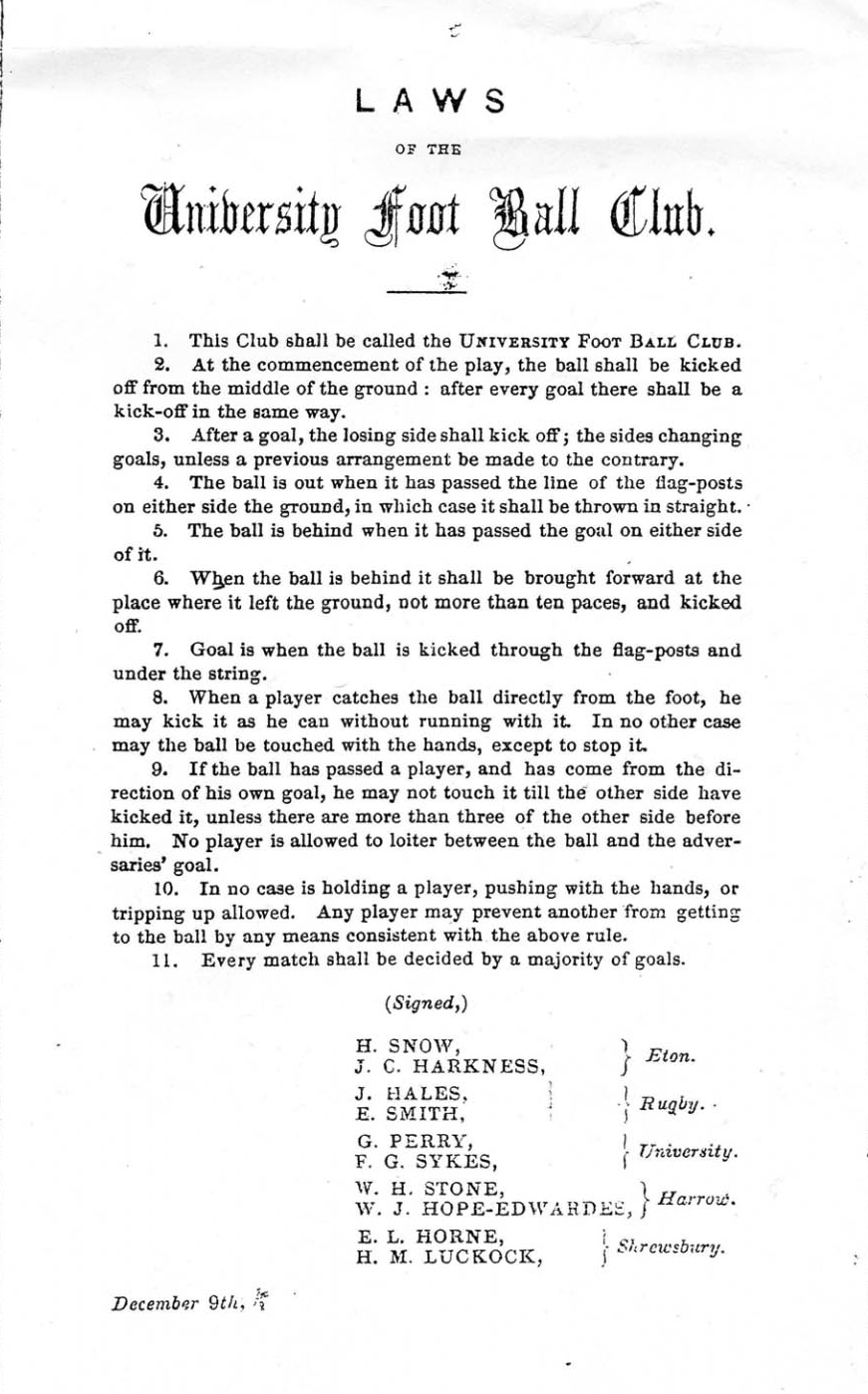
The Cambridge Rules of 1856, one of the first codes of football that formed the basis of the current association football rules

The foundation date of 1856 is based upon the 1856 copy of the Cambridge Rules held by Shrewsbury School which is entitled: "The Laws of the University Foot Ball Club". The Club history probably goes back even further: for example, Harvey states: "Salopians formed a club of their own in the late 1830s/early 1840s but that was presumably absorbed by the Cambridge University Football Club that they were so influential in creating in 1846" Certainly in the early 1840s Charles Astor Bristed confirms that at Cambridge there were games played between football clubs from different colleges and houses Similarly, other sources show that an Arthur Pell established a football club at Cambridge in 1839. This may have been the origin of the Cambridge AFC.

Colin Weir asserted in his history of CUAFC that: "it would be hard to exaggerate the influence that the University footballers of Cambridge have had on the game in England and subsequently all over the world". This is borne out by the fact that the Cambridge Rules were an influence on the initial rules of The Football Association (FA) in October 1863, the first code for association football. Cambridge graduates set up many early football clubs, such as Hallam F.C. in the north and the Forest Club in Essex.

=== Club establishment ===
Meanwhile, within the university the 1860s witnessed the foundation of a formalised Cambridge University Association Football Club (CUAFC); the university club had previously been a somewhat ad hoc mix of students from Trinity and Jesus. Once Oxford had followed suit, there was immediate talk of a Varsity match, and on 30 March 1874 the two Universities first met. Although the Light Blues succumbed 1–0, they were to dominate their Oxford counterparts until the end of the century.

In 1882, and CUAFC were still playing on Parker's Piece. A meeting of the Club concluded that it would be advisable to buy a ground, for Parker's Piece was not appropriate "owing to the fact that anyone can walk across and about the ground during the game". But it was not until 1895, that they were able to acquire Grange Road, in tandem with the Rugby Club, for £4,300. They were still paying it off until just before the First World War. Grange Road remains the university ground, although it was joined by Fenner's in 1975.

The 1883 side was the first team to introduce the "pyramid" 2–3–5 formation (two defenders, three midfield, and five strikers). Following the success of the "Cambridge pyramid" this formation became the norm for all football teams.

Notable players of 1883 side included Nevill Cobbold, Arthur Dunn and Francis Pawson. Their passing, attacking style led to a 3–2 victory in the Varsity match. The changes to team formation and playing style introduced by Cambridge AFC led to the longest consecutive run of victories (1883–1887) against the other university and their spectacular 5–1 victory in 1886

Combination play by Cambridge University FC is suggested in contemporary accounts as early as Dec 1872: "The goal for the university was the result of the combined efforts of Adams, Sparham and Smith". In this account Cambridge "played well together".

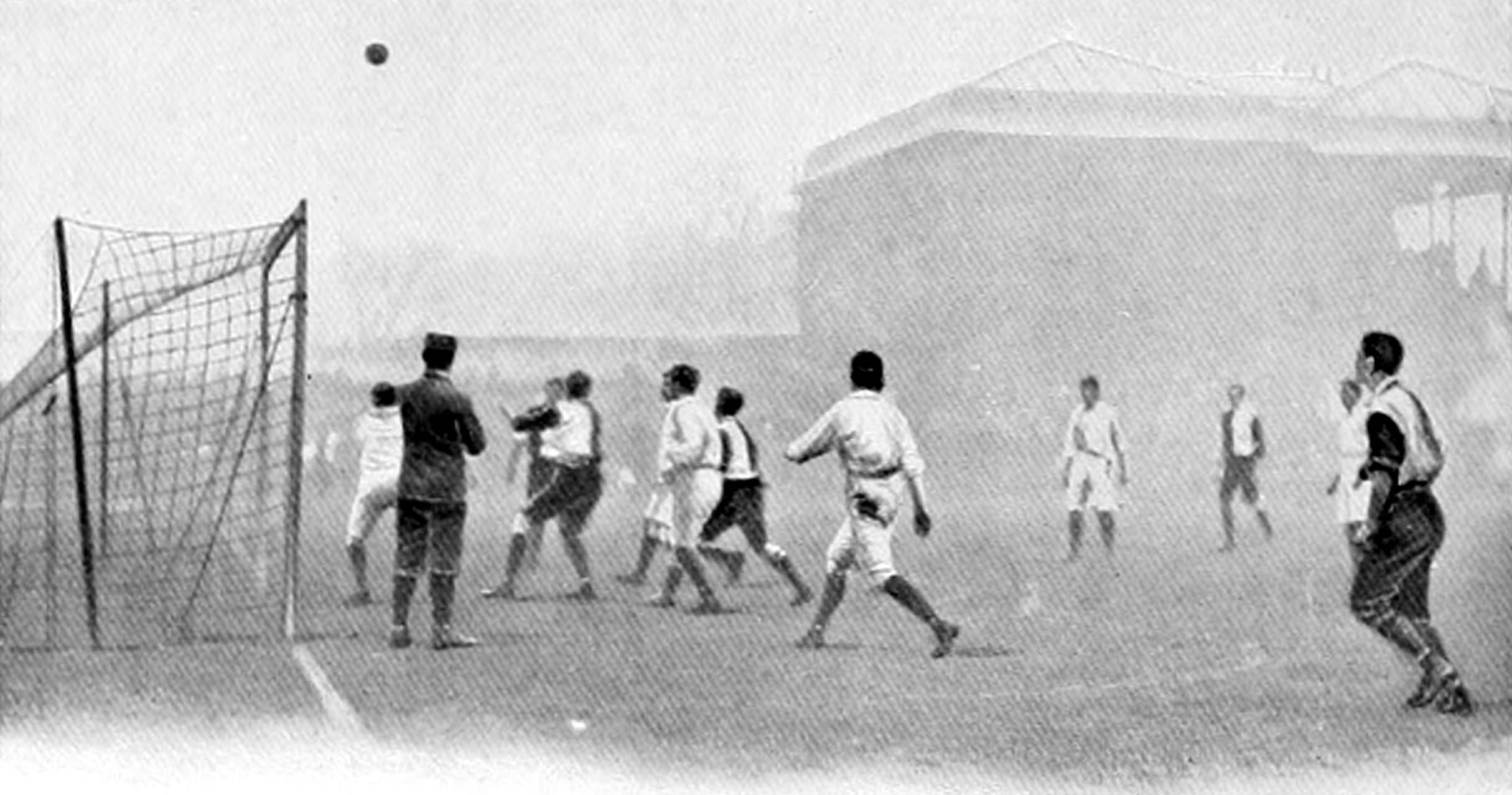
Scene of a match v Oxford in 1905

Nationally, with the new social legislation of the early 20th century that distributed more money to the working classes and increased leisure time (particularly on Saturday afternoons) and with new technological advances, such as the expanse of railways, which facilitated the nationalisation of leagues, the game of football was truly blooming. All the great clubs of today were formed at this time. The munitions workers at Woolwich Arsenal put down their tools and started picking up their boots in 1886. Members of the cricket club at Everton widened their sporting interests in 1878. However, a disgruntled manager would later decide to form a rival club that played in red. With the support of the Three Crowns, Newton Heath was founded in 1878, soon joining with another side to become Manchester United, while Aston Villa grew out of the Bible Class at a Wesleyan Chapel in 1874. Fair to say that CUAFC's creation had truly captured the imagination of people from all walks of life.

Cambridge University embraced this football explosion. It provided almost fifty England internationals in the early years. It was given a seat on the FA Council, which it maintains to this day. It has played against a plethora of league sides from within Britain and abroad; the first overseas tour took place in Hungary in 1902. Varsity matches were contested at Wembley Stadium until 1989.

=== Present days ===
The pride in this history and tradition within the club held the celebrations of its 150th anniversary in 2006: there was a lunch at the new Wembley Stadium, attended by officials of the FA, UEFA and FIFA. There was also a match against an FA XI on 1 May 2006, and a German TV documentary in which current players helped re-created that first game on Parker's Piece in 1866.

In 2016 the National Football Museum presented a special award to CUAFC who the museum recognise as the oldest football club in the world, setting its date of foundation in 1856.

A professional coaching set-up is being maintained. The club now has six teams competing in National BUCS leagues, three each from the men's and women's sides. 2024/25 was a particularly successful season for the club, with all three women's teams winning their Varsity match against Oxford and all but the men's 2s also winning. The women's Blues made it three in a row with a 3-2 victory through goals from Alissa Sattentau, Sakhna Dhirani, and Johanna Niggemann, whilst a dominant men's Blues performance saw a 4-1 win through goals by Asa Campbell and Cai La Trobe-Roberts (3), with both games occurring on a Friday night at Cambridge's Abbey Stadium. Ella O'Connell and Cai La Trobe-Roberts were awarded Player of the Match in the women's and men's match respectively.

== Legacy ==
=== Development of the modern passing style ===
In a detailed investigation into the evolution of football tactics based upon contemporary accounts, Adrian Harvey refers to the teams responsible for the early development of the passing game (including Sheffield, The Royal Engineers and Queens Park) but comes to the following conclusion about the finished, modern team product: "Curiously, the side that was generally credited with transforming the tactics of association football and almost single-handedly inventing the modern game was not a professional team but the Cambridge University XI of 1882. Contemporaries described Cambridge as being the first "combination" team in which each player was allotted an area of the field and played as part of a team in a game that was based upon passing".

In a discussion by CW Alcock on the history of a "definite scheme of attack" and "elaborate combination" in football playing style, he states in 1891: "The perfection of the system which is in vogue at the present time however is in a very great measure the creation of the last few years. The Cambridge University eleven of 1882 were the first to illustrate the full possibilities of a systematic combination giving full scope to the defence as well as the attack" Although there is some disagreement over whether the innovation began with the team of 1882 or 3, other historians have backed up this view, including the football historian Sir Montague Shearman.

== England internationals ==
Twenty-four Cambridge players were capped for England.

The full list of England players (with the number of caps received whilst registered with Cambridge University A.F.C.) were:

- John Brockbank (1 cap)
- Cuthbert Burnup (1 cap)
- William Cobbold (6 caps)
- Norman Cooper (1 cap)
- George Cotterill (1 cap)
- Percy de Paravicini (3 caps)
- Arthur Dunn (2 caps)
- Leslie Gay (1 cap)
- Stanley S. Harris (1 cap)
- Arthur Henfrey (1 cap)
- Beaumont Jarrett (3 caps)
- Tinsley Lindley (9 caps)
- Vaughan Lodge (3 caps)
- Alfred Lyttelton (1 cap)
- Edward Lyttelton (1 cap)
- Reginald Macaulay (1 cap)
- Francis Pawson (1 cap)
- Thelwell Pike (1 cap)
- John Frederick Peel Rawlinson (1 cap)
- Benjamin Spilsbury (3 caps)
- Ralph Squire (3 caps)
- Arthur Walters (5 caps)
- Gordon Wright (1 cap)

== See also ==
- Oldest football clubs

== Bibliography ==
- Colin Weir, 2004, History of Cambridge University Association Football Club. (Yore Publications: Harefield). ISBN 1-874427-86-0.
