= England national football team results (1872–1899) =

- Win Draw Loss

The England national football team represents England in association football and is controlled by The Football Association. It is the joint-oldest national football team in the world, alongside Scotland, England's opponents in what is now recognised as the world's first international football match, which took place at Hamilton Crescent in Glasgow in November 1872. Prior to this, a series of matches had been played between teams representing the two countries, but the Scottish team was drawn almost entirely from players based in and around London and these games are now not regarded as full international matches.

Between 1872 and 1899, which was the end of the 19th century, England played in 61 matches, resulting in 37 wins, 9 draws and 15 defeats. During this time England played annual friendly against Scotland each year until 1883, and added a regular game against Wales in 1879. These two teams remained England's only opponents until the British Home Championship was instituted in 1884, consisting of a round-robin tournament between England, Scotland, Wales and Ireland. Of the 15 tournaments staged prior to the 20th century, England won 7 outright and 2 jointly with Scotland.

== 1870s ==
=== 1872 ===
30 November International Friendly	Scotland	0–0	England	Glasgow, Scotland
		Report		Stadium: Hamilton Crescent; Referee: William Keay

=== 1873 ===
8 March International Friendly	England	4–2	Scotland	London, England
	Kenyon-Slaney; Bonsor; Chenery	Report	Renny-Tailyour; Gibb	Stadium: Kennington Oval; Referee: T Lloyd

=== 1874 ===
7 March International Friendly	Scotland	2–1	England	Glasgow, Scotland
	Anderson; A. MacKinnon	Report	Kingsford	Stadium: Hamilton Crescent

=== 1875 ===
6 March International Friendly	England	2–2	Scotland	London, England
	Wollaston; Alcock	Report	McNeil; Andrews	Stadium: Kennington Oval; Attendance: 2

=== 1876 ===
4 March International Friendly	Scotland	3–0	England	Glasgow, Scotland
	B. MacKinnon; McNeil; Highet	Report		Stadium: Hamilton Crescent

=== 1877 ===
3 March International Friendly	England	1–3	Scotland	London, England
	Lyttleton	Report	Ferguson; Richmond	Stadium: Kennington Oval

=== 1878 ===
2 March International Friendly	Scotland	7–2	England	Glasgow, Scotland
	B. MacKinnon; McDougall; McNeil	Report	Wylie; A. Cursham	Stadium: Hampden Park

=== 1879 ===
18 January International Friendly	England	2–1	Wales	London, England
	Whitfield; Sorby	Report	Davies	Stadium: Kennington Oval; Attendance: 100

5 April International Friendly	England	5–4	Scotland	London, England
	Mosforth; C. Bambridge; Goodyer; Parlane (o.g.)	Report	B. MacKinnon; McDougall; Smith	Stadium: Kennington Oval

== 1880s ==
=== 1880 ===
13 March International Friendly	Scotland	5–4	England	Glasgow, Scotland
	Ker; Baird; Kay	Report	Mosforth; C. Bambridge; Sparks	Stadium: Hampden Park

15 March International Friendly	Wales	2–3	England	Wrexham, Wales
	W. Roberts; J. Roberts	Report	Brindle; Sparks	Stadium: Racecourse Ground

=== 1881 ===
26 February International Friendly	England	0–1	Wales	Blackburn, England
		Report	Vaughan	Stadium: Alexandra Meadows

12 March International Friendly	England	1–6	Scotland	London, England
	Bambridge	Report	Smith; Hill; Ker	Stadium: Kennington Oval

=== 1882 ===
18 February International Friendly	Ireland	0–13	England	Belfast, Ireland
		Report	Vaughton; J. Brown; A. Brown; C. Bambridge; H. Cursham	Stadium: Knock Ground

11 March International Friendly	Scotland	5–1	England	Glasgow, Scotland
	Harrower; Ker; McPherson; Kay	Report	Vaughton	Stadium: Hampden Park

13 March International Friendly	Wales	5–3	England	Wrexham, Wales
	Owen; Morgan; Jones (o.g.); Vaughan	Report	Mosforth; Parry; H. Cursham	Stadium: Racecourse Ground

=== 1883 ===
3 February International Friendly	England	5–0	Wales	London, England
	Mitchell; C. Bambridge; A. Cursham	Report		Stadium: Kennington Oval

24 February International Friendly	England	7–0	Ireland	Liverpool, England
	Whateley; Cobbold; Dunn; Pawson	Report		Stadium: Aigburth Cricket Ground

10 March International Friendly	England	2–3	Scotland	Sheffield, England
	Mitchell; Cobbold	Report	Smith; Fraser	Stadium: Bramall Lane

=== 1884 ===
23 February Home Championship	Ireland	1–8	England	Belfast, Ireland
	McWha	Report	Johnson; A. Bambridge; H. Cursham; C. Bambridge	Stadium: Ballynafeigh Park

15 March Home Championship	Scotland	1–0	England	Glasgow, Scotland
	Smith	Report		Stadium: Cathkin Park

17 March Home Championship	Wales	0–4	England	Wrexham, Wales
		Report	Bromley-Davenport; Bailey; Gunn	Stadium: Racecourse Ground

=== 1885 ===
28 February Home Championship	England	4–0	Ireland	Manchester, England
	C. Bambridge; J.Brown; Spilsbury; Lofthouse	Report		Stadium: Whalley Range

14 March Home Championship	England	1–1	Wales	Blackburn, England
	Mitchell	Report	Wilding	Stadium: Leamington Road

21 March Home Championship	England	1–1	Scotland	London, England
	C. Bambridge	Report	Lindsay	Stadium: Kennington Oval

=== 1886 ===
13 March Home Championship	Ireland	1–6	England	Belfast, Ireland
	Williams	Report	Lindley; Dewhurst; Spilsbury	Stadium: Ballynafeigh Park

27 March Home Championship	Scotland	1–1	England	Glasgow, Scotland
	Somerville	Report	Lindley	Stadium: Hampden Park

29 March Home Championship	Wales	1–3	England	Wrexham, Wales
	Lewis	Report	Brann; Dewhurst; Amos	Stadium: Racecourse Ground

=== 1887 ===
5 February Home Championship	England	7–0	Ireland	Sheffield, England
	Dewhurst; Cobbold; Lindley	Report		Stadium: Bramall Lane

26 February Home Championship	England	4–0	Wales	London, England
	Cobbold; Lindley; Powell (o.g.)	Report		Stadium: Kennington Oval

19 March Home Championship	England	2–3	Scotland	Blackburn, England
	Lindley; Dewhurst	Report	McCall; Keir; Allan	Stadium: Leamington Road

=== 1888 ===
13 March Home Championship	Wales	1–5	England	Crewe, England
	Doughty	Report	Dewhurst; Woodhall; Lindley; Goodall	Stadium: Nantwich Road

17 March Home Championship	Scotland	0–5	England	Glasgow, Scotland
		Report	Lindley; Hodgetts; Dewhurst; Goodall	Stadium: Hampden Park

7 April Home Championship	Ireland	1–5	England	Belfast, Ireland
	Crone	Report	Dewhurst; A. Allen; Lindley	Stadium: Ballynafeigh Park

=== 1889 ===
23 February Home Championship	England	5–1	Wales	Stoke-on-Trent, England
	Goodall; Dewhurst; Southworth; Bassett	Report	Owen	Stadium: Victoria Ground

2 March Home Championship	England	6–1	Ireland	Liverpool, England
	Shelton; Yates; Lofthouse; Brodie	Report	Wilton	Stadium: Anfield

13 April Home Championship	England	2–3	Scotland	London, England
	Bassett	Report	Munro; Oswald; McLaren	Stadium: Kennington Oval

== 1890s ==
=== 1890 ===
15 March Home Championship	Wales	1–3	England	Wrexham, Wales
	Lewis	Report	Currey; Lindley	Stadium: Racecourse Ground

15 March Home Championship	Ireland	1–9	England	Belfast, Ireland
	Reynolds	Report	Geary; Townley; Lofthouse; Davenport; Barton	Stadium: Ballynafeigh Park

5 April Home Championship	Scotland	1–1	England	Glasgow, Scotland
	McPherson	Report	Wood	Stadium: Hampden Park

=== 1891 ===
7 March Home Championship	England	6–1	Ireland	Wolverhampton, England
	Lindley; Bassett; Cotterill; Henfrey; Daft	Report	Whiteside	Stadium: Molineux

7 March Home Championship	England	4–1	Wales	Sunderland, England
	Goodall; Southworth; Chadwick; Milward	Report	Howell	Stadium: Newcastle Road

4 April Home Championship	England	2–1	Scotland	Blackburn, England
	Goodall; Chadwick	Report	Watt	Stadium: Ewood Park

=== 1892 ===
5 March Home Championship	Wales	0–2	England	Wrexham, Wales
		Report	Henfrey; Sandilands	Stadium: Racecourse Ground

5 March Home Championship	Ireland	0–2	England	Belfast, Ireland
		Report	Daft	Stadium: Solitude

2 April Home Championship	Scotland	1–4	England	Glasgow, Scotland
	Bell	Report	Chadwick; Goodall; Southworth	Stadium: Ibrox Park

=== 1893 ===
25 February Home Championship	England	6–1	Ireland	Birmingham, England
	Gilliat 8', 18', 30'; Smith 43'; Winckworth 60'; Sandilands 75'	Report	Gaffikin 9'	Stadium: Wellington Road; Attendance: 10,000; Referee: Thomas R. Park (Scotland)

13 March Home Championship	England	6–0	Wales	Stoke-on-Trent, England
	Spiksley 25', 43', 88'; Bassett 47'; Goodall 49'; Reynolds 75'	Report; Report		Stadium: Victoria Ground; Attendance: 10,000; Referee: John Campbell (Scotland)

1 April Home Championship	England	5–2	Scotland	London, England
	Gosling 15'; Cotterill 65'; Spiksley 78', 80', 84'	Report; Report; Report	Waddell 30'; Sellar 55'	Stadium: Richmond Athletic Ground; Attendance: 16,000; Referee: John Charles Clegg (England)

=== 1894 ===
3 March Home Championship	Ireland	2–2	England	Belfast, Ireland
	Stanfield; Gibson	Report	Devey; Spiksley	Stadium: Solitude

12 March Home Championship	Wales	1–5	England	Wrexham, Wales
	Bowdler	Report	Veitch; Parry (o.g.); Gosling	Stadium: Racecourse Ground

7 April Home Championship	Scotland	2–2	England	Glasgow, Scotland
	Lambie; McMahon	Report	Goodall; Reynolds	Stadium: Celtic Park

=== 1895 ===
9 March Home Championship	England	9–0	Ireland	Derby, England
	Torrens (o.g.); Bloomer; Becton; Bassett; Howell; Goodall	Report		Stadium: County Cricket Ground

18 March Home Championship	England	1–1	Wales	London, England
	Sandilands	Report	Lewis	Stadium: Queen's Club

6 April Home Championship	England	3–0	Scotland	Liverpool, England
	Bloomer; Gibson (o.g.); S. Smith	Report		Stadium: Goodison Park

=== 1896 ===
7 March Home Championship	Ireland	0–2	England	Belfast, Ireland
		Report	G. O. Smith; Bloomer	Stadium: Solitude

16 March Home Championship	Wales	1–9	England	Cardiff, Wales
	Chapman	Report	G. O. Smith; Bloomer; Bassett; Goodall	Stadium: Cardiff Arms Park

4 April Home Championship	Scotland	2–1	England	Glasgow, Scotland
	Lambie; Bell	Report	Bassett	Stadium: Celtic Park

=== 1897 ===
20 February Home Championship	England	6–0	Ireland	Nottingham, England
	Bloomer; Wheldon; Athersmith	Report		Stadium: Trent Bridge

29 March Home Championship	England	4–0	Wales	Sheffield, England
	Needham; Bloomer; Milward	Report		Stadium: Bramall Lane

3 April Home Championship	England	1–2	Scotland	London, England
	Bloomer	Report	Hyslop; Millar	Stadium: Crystal Palace

=== 1898 ===
5 March Home Championship	Ireland	2–3	England	Belfast, Ireland
	Pyper; McAllen	Report	G. O. Smith; Athersmith; Morren	Stadium: Solitude

28 March Home Championship	Wales	0–3	England	Wrexham, Wales
		Report	G. O. Smith; Wheldon	Stadium: Racecourse Ground

2 April Home Championship	Scotland	1–3	England	Glasgow, Scotland
	Millar	Report	Wheldon; Bloomer	Stadium: Celtic Park

=== 1899 ===
18 February Home Championship	England	13–2	Ireland	Sunderland, England
	Frank Forman; Fred Forman; Athersmith; G. O. Smith; Bloomer; Settle	Report	McAllen (pen.); Campbell	Stadium: Roker Park

20 March Home Championship	England	4–0	Wales	Bristol, England
	Needham; Bloomer; Fred Forman	Report		Stadium: Ashton Gate

8 April Home Championship	England	2–1	Scotland	Birmingham, England
	G. O. Smith; Settle	Report	Hamilton	Stadium: Villa Park
