= 1892–93 in English football =

Football in England
- Season: 1892–93

Men's football
- First Division: Sunderland
- Second Division: Small Heath
- FA Cup: Wolverhampton Wanderers

The 1892–93 season was the 22nd season of competitive football in England.

== Events ==
The Football League and the Football Alliance formally merged, and so the Football League Second Division was formed, consisting mostly of Football Alliance clubs. The existing League clubs, minus Darwen (who were relegated) plus three of the strongest Alliance clubs (Nottingham Forest, Newton Heath and The Wednesday, who would later be renamed Manchester United and Sheffield Wednesday respectively), comprised the Football League First Division.

The Second Division comprised the remaining Football Alliance teams, plus Northwich Victoria, Burslem Port Vale and Sheffield United.

Liverpool, formed in March 1892 by Anfield landlord John Houlding after Everton's exit to Goodison Park, join the Lancashire League. They would be elected to the Football League Second Division after one season in the Lancashire League.

== National team ==
=== Ireland ===
England's opening international game of the season took place in Birmingham on 25 February against Ireland, with the selectors choosing a team consisting mainly of players with connections to the Corinthians, of which seven were making their England débuts. Chris Charsley of Small Heath, who later went on to be Chief Constable of Coventry, made his solitary England appearance in goal. Alban Harrison (Old Westminsters) and Fred Pelly (Old Foresters) made their débuts as the two full-backs and Norman Cooper (Cambridge University) made his solitary appearance at centre-half. Robert Topham, an amateur player with Wolverhampton Wanderers, who had previously declined an invitation to play for Wales following his selection in 1885, made the first of his two appearances at outside right, with Walter Gilliat of Old Carthusians making his solitary appearance at inside right. Gilliat, an excellent dribbler of the ball, would probably have made more England appearances but for his religious beliefs, and went on to become the vicar of Iver and the rector of Sevenoaks.

The most notable débutante was Gilbert Oswald Smith of Oxford University, who went on to represent his country on 20 occasions in a career spanning 8 years (scoring 11 goals) and was captain 16 times. He was considered by many to be the world's best player of the 19th Century.

England totally dominated the match itself with Walter Gilliat scoring three times in the first 30 minutes, although Ireland had levelled the scores shortly after England's first goal. Further goals from G.O. Smith, William Winckworth and Rupert Sandilands enabled England to run out convincing 6–1 victors. Gilliat thus became one of only five players to have scored a hat-trick in his only appearance in an England shirt.

=== Wales ===
For the match against Wales at Stoke-on-Trent two weeks later, the selectors chose a team consisting entirely of professional players, of which four were making their début. In goal they selected John Willie Sutcliffe of Bolton Wanderers, for the first of his 5 appearances; Sutcliffe had previously made an appearance for the English rugby union side. Jimmy Turner (Bolton Wanderers) and Jimmy Whitehead (Blackburn Rovers) made their débuts at left half and inside right respectively. The fourth débutante was Fred Spiksley of The Wednesday who made the first of seven England appearances at outside left, from where he scored seven goals during his England career, including a hat-trick on his debut.

Once again, England were comfortable victors, with further goals from Billy Bassett, John Goodall and Jack Reynolds as England easily defeated the Welsh 6–0.

=== Scotland ===
England's final international match of the season came at Richmond Athletic Ground on 1 April against Scotland who were hoping to avenge their defeat in each of the two previous seasons. England selected a strong eleven, with only Leslie Gay of Old Brightonians making his début in goal. Gay later played Test cricket for England.

England ultimately enjoyed another comfortable victory; Gosling scored after 15 minutes, but Scotland went ahead with goals after 30 and 55 minutes. A goal from captain George Cotterill brought England level after 65 minutes. Fred Spiksley then scored twice in two minutes before completing his hat-trick after 84 minutes, thus enabling England to continue their fine run against the Scots.

As a result, England were the winners of the British Home Championship for the third consecutive season.

Date	Venue	Opponents	Score*	Comp	England scorers
25 February 1893	Wellington Road (Perry Barr), Birmingham (H)	Ireland	6–1	BHC	Walter Gilliat (Old Carthusians) (10, 18 & 30 mins), G.O. Smith (Corinthian) (43 mins), William Winckworth (Old Westminsters) (60 mins) & Rupert Sandilands (Old Westminsters) (75 mins)
13 March 1893	Victoria Ground, Stoke-on-Trent (H)	Wales	6–0	BHC	Fred Spiksley (Sheffield Wednesday) (25, 43 & 88 mins), Billy Bassett (West Bromwich Albion) (47 mins), John Goodall (Derby County) (49 mins) & Jack Reynolds (West Bromwich Albion) (75 mins)
1 April 1893	Richmond Athletic Ground, London (H)	Scotland	5–2	BHC	R. Cunliffe Gosling (Old Etonians) (15 mins), George Cotterill (Old Brightonians) (65 mins) & Fred Spiksley (Sheffield Wednesday) (78, 80 & 84 mins)

* England score given first

Key

- H = Home match
- BHC = British Home Championship

== Honours ==
Competition	Winner
First Division	Sunderland (2*)
Second Division	Small Heath
FA Cup	Wolverhampton Wanderers (1)
Home Championship	England

Notes = Number in parentheses is the times that club has won that honour. * indicates new record for competition

== League table ==
=== First Division ===
Pos	Team	Pld	W	D	L	GF	GA	GAv	Pts	Relegation
1	Sunderland (C)	30	22	4	4	100	36	2.778	48	
2	Preston North End	30	17	3	10	57	39	1.462	37	
3	Everton	30	16	4	10	74	51	1.451	36	
4	Aston Villa	30	16	3	11	73	62	1.177	35	
5	Bolton Wanderers	30	13	6	11	56	55	1.018	32	
6	Burnley	30	13	4	13	51	44	1.159	30	
7	Stoke	30	12	5	13	58	48	1.208	29	
8	West Bromwich Albion	30	12	5	13	58	69	0.841	29	
9	Blackburn Rovers	30	8	13	9	47	56	0.839	29	
10	Nottingham Forest	30	10	8	12	48	52	0.923	28	
11	Wolverhampton Wanderers	30	12	4	14	47	68	0.691	28	
12	The Wednesday	30	12	3	15	55	65	0.846	27	
13	Derby County	30	9	9	12	52	64	0.813	27	
14	Notts County (R)	30	10	4	16	53	61	0.869	24	Qualification for test matches
15	Accrington (R)	30	6	11	13	57	81	0.704	23	Resigned from league after test matches (Note: Accrington did not join the Second Division for the following season after losing their test match.)
16	Newton Heath (O)	30	6	6	18	50	85	0.588	18	Qualification for test matches

Source: World Football
Rules for classification: 1) Points; 2) Goal average; 3) Goals scored
(C) Champions; (O) Play-off winners; (R) Relegated

=== Second Division ===
Pos	Team	Pld	W	D	L	GF	GA	GAv	Pts	Qualification or relegation
1	Small Heath (C)	22	17	2	3	90	35	2.571	36	Qualification for test matches
2	Sheffield United (O, P)	22	16	3	3	62	19	3.263	35	Qualification for test matches
3	Darwen (O, P)	22	14	2	6	60	36	1.667	30	Qualification for test matches
4	Grimsby Town	22	11	1	10	42	41	1.024	23	
5	Ardwick	22	9	3	10	45	40	1.125	21	
6	Burton Swifts	22	9	2	11	47	47	1.000	20	
7	Northwich Victoria	22	9	2	11	42	58	0.724	20	
8	Bootle (Note: Bootle was liquidated at the end of the season.)	22	8	3	11	49	63	0.778	19	Resigned from league and folded
9	Lincoln City	22	7	3	12	45	51	0.882	17	Re-elected
10	Crewe Alexandra	22	6	3	13	42	69	0.609	15	Re-elected
11	Burslem Port Vale	22	6	3	13	30	57	0.526	15	Re-elected
12	Walsall Town Swifts	22	5	3	14	37	75	0.493	13	Re-elected

Rules for classification: 1) Points; 2) Goal average; 3) Goals scored
(C) Champions; (O) Play-off winners; (P) Promoted

=== Test match results ===
Home team	Score	Away team	Notes
Small Heath	1–1	Newton Heath	
Newton Heath	5–2	Small Heath	Replay, Newton Heath and Small Heath remain in their respective divisions.
Darwen	3–2	Notts County	Darwen promoted, Notts County relegated
Sheffield United	1–0	Accrington	Sheffield United promoted, Accrington resign from Football League
