= 1891–92 in English football =

Football in England
- Season: 1891–92

Men's football
- Football League: Sunderland
- FA Cup: West Bromwich Albion

The 1891–92 season was the 21st season of competitive football in England.

== Events ==
The Football League expanded to fourteen clubs by electing two from the 1890–91 Football Alliance, which lost one more by the defection of Sunderland Albion to the Northern League. The Alliance remained at 12 members by adding three new clubs: Ardwick (later Manchester City), Burton Swifts and Lincoln City.

Everton left Anfield on 15 March 1892 after a dispute with the stadium's landlord, John Houlding. Everton moved into a new stadium at nearby Goodison Park, while Houlding formed a new football club—Liverpool F.C.—on 30 March 1892, to play at Anfield.

Preston North End set a new league record by winning 13 consecutive matches up to March 1892. A month later Sunderland equalled the record when they won their 13th successive game. The record of 13 consecutive wins in a single season stood for 125 years until broken by Manchester City in 2017.

Aston Villa recorded their biggest ever victory, defeating Accrington 12-2 on 12 March 1892.

== National team ==
In the 1892 British Home Championship, for the third (and final) time England played matches against Wales and Ireland on the same day, 5 March 1892, winning both by a 2–0 margin.

=== Wales ===
For the Welsh game, England selected a team consisting mainly of players with Corinthian connections and awarded eight new caps. The new caps included professionals George Toone of Notts County in goal, Henry Lilley of Sheffield United (making his only England appearance at left-back) and George Kinsey (Wolverhampton Wanderers) at left-half. Joe Schofield a Staffordshire schoolteacher with Stoke City played at outside-left. The other débutantes were Anthony Hossack (Corinthian), William Winckworth (Old Westminsters), Robert Cunliffe Gosling (Old Etonians) and Rupert Sandilands (Old Westminsters). England were a little too skilful for the Welsh and ran out 2–0 winners with goals from Arthur Henfrey and Rupert Sandilands.

=== Ireland ===
Against Ireland, England issued a further five new caps. The most prominent débutante was Charlie Athersmith of Aston Villa at outside-right, who would continue to appear for England over the next eight years, making twelve appearances in all. He was accompanied by his club team-mate, Jack Devey. The other new caps were John Cox of Derby County, Michael Whitham of Sheffield United and John Pearson of Crewe Alexandra for each of whom this was their solitary England appearance. Pearson went on to have a successful career as a Football League referee, including the 1911 FA Cup Final. Harry Daft of Notts County was awarded the captaincy for his last of five England appearances and marked the occasion by scoring twice, either side of half-time.

=== Scotland ===
Scotland also beat both Wales and Ireland and, as a result, the outcome of the British Home Championship rested on the final game of the season (for the third consecutive year). England selected a much more experienced team than for the Wales and Ireland games, and only included four players who had featured in those games, including only one of the debutantes, George Toone in goal. Jack Reynolds, the West Bromwich Albion full-back, was selected to play for England for the first time, even though he had previously played five international games for Ireland, having scored against England on 15 March 1890. It had wrongly been assumed that Reynolds was born in Ireland; however, his birth certificate had proved that he was in fact born in Blackburn, thereby enabling him to make eight appearances for England. England rattled in four goals in the first 21 minutes, and although Scotland scored a late consolation goal, England were able to continue their excellent run of results against the Scots and claim the championship again.

Date	Venue	Opponents	Score*	Comp	England scorers
5 March 1892	Racecourse Ground, Wrexham (A)	Wales	2–0	BHC	15' Arthur Henfrey (Corinthian), 87' Rupert Sandilands (Old Westminsters)
5 March 1892	Solitude, Belfast (A)	Ireland	2–0	BHC	44', 47' Harry Daft (Notts Co.)
2 April 1892	Ibrox Park, Glasgow (A)	Scotland	4–1	BHC	1' Edgar Chadwick (Everton), 14', 21' John Goodall (Derby Co.), 16' Jack Southworth (Blackburn Rovers)

* England score given first

Key

- A = Home match
- BHC = British Home Championship

== Honours ==
Competition	Winner
The Football League	Sunderland (1)
FA Cup	West Bromwich Albion (2)
Football Alliance	Nottingham Forest
Home Championship	England

Notes = Number in parentheses is the times that club has won that honour. * indicates new record for competition

== League tables ==
=== The Football League ===
Pos	Team	Pld	W	D	L	GF	GA	GAv	Pts	Qualification
1	Sunderland (C)	26	21	0	5	93	36	2.583	42	
2	Preston North End	26	18	1	7	61	31	1.968	37	
3	Bolton Wanderers	26	17	2	7	51	37	1.378	36	
4	Aston Villa	26	15	0	11	89	56	1.589	30	
5	Everton	26	12	4	10	49	49	1.000	28	
6	Wolverhampton Wanderers	26	11	4	11	59	46	1.283	26	
7	Burnley	26	11	4	11	49	45	1.089	26	
8	Notts County	26	11	4	11	55	51	1.078	26	
9	Blackburn Rovers	26	10	6	10	58	65	0.892	26	
10	Derby County	26	10	4	12	46	52	0.885	24	
11	Accrington	26	8	4	14	40	78	0.513	20	Re-elected
12	West Bromwich Albion	26	6	6	14	51	58	0.879	18	Reprieved from re-election (Note: West Bromwich Albion were reprieved from re-election due to winning the 1891–92 FA Cup.)
13	Stoke	26	5	4	17	38	61	0.623	14	Re-elected
14	Darwen (R)	26	4	3	19	38	112	0.339	11	Failed re-election and demoted to the Second Division

(C) Champions; (R) Relegated

=== The Football Alliance ===
Pos	Team	Pld	W	D	L	GF	GA	GAv	Pts	Qualification or relegation
1	Nottingham Forest (C, P)	22	14	5	3	59	22	2.682	33	Elected to the Football League First Division
2	Newton Heath (P)	22	12	7	3	69	33	2.091	31	Elected to the Football League First Division
3	Small Heath (E)	22	12	5	5	53	36	1.472	29	Elected to the Football League Second Division
4	The Wednesday (P)	22	12	4	6	65	35	1.857	28	Elected to the Football League First Division
5	Burton Swifts (E)	22	12	2	8	54	52	1.038	26	Elected to the Football League Second Division
6	Crewe Alexandra (E)	22	7	4	11	44	49	0.898	18	Elected to the Football League Second Division
7	Ardwick (E)	22	6	6	10	39	51	0.765	18	Elected to the Football League Second Division
8	Bootle (E)	22	8	2	12	42	64	0.656	18	Elected to the Football League Second Division
9	Lincoln City (E)	22	6	5	11	37	65	0.569	17	Elected to the Football League Second Division
10	Grimsby Town (E)	22	6	6	10	40	39	1.026	16 (Note: Grimsby Town were deducted two points for fielding ineligible players.)	Elected to the Football League Second Division
11	Walsall Town Swifts (E)	22	6	3	13	33	59	0.559	15	Elected to the Football League Second Division
12	Birmingham St George's	22	5	3	14	34	64	0.531	11 (Note: Birmingham St George's were deducted two points for fielding ineligible players.)	Disbanded (Note: Birmingham St George's were disbanded at the end of the season due to financial problems.)

Rules for classification: 1) points; 2) goal average.
(C) Champions; (E) Elected to the Football League Second Division; (P) Promoted
