= 1892–93 British Home Championship =

Tournament details
- Host country: England, Ireland, Scotland and Wales
- Dates: 25 February – 8 April 1893
- Teams: 4

Final positions
- Champions: England (6th title)
- Runners-up: Scotland

Tournament statistics
- Matches played: 6
- Goals scored: 42 (7 per match)
- Top scorer: (England) Fred Spiksley (6 goals)

The 1892–93 British Home Championship was an international football tournament between the British Home Nations. The competition was won and dominated by England, who beat all three rival teams and scored 17 goals in just three matches. Fred Spiksley claimed four and Walter Gilliat scored a hat-trick in the competition's opening game. Scotland came second with victories over Ireland and Wales, who finished third and fourth respectively.

England began as the strongest team, scoring twelve goals in the first two games against the Irish and the Welsh with only one in reply. Scotland too began well, winning their match against Wales in Wales by 8–0 before netting another six in a rout of Ireland at home. In the final games, England and Scotland played a match in London which England easily won 5–2 to whitewash their opponents and take the trophy. In a consolation game in Belfast, Ireland beat Wales 4–3 to finish third.

The official attendance for the England v. Scotland match was 16,000; the crowd was so large that it was forced to stand in front of the journalists who were therefore prevented from seeing all of the action. Consequently, there is some dispute over the goal-scorers: although it is not credited in any of the official references, it is now generally accepted that Spiksley scored a hat-trick.

== Table ==
| Team | Pld | W | D | L | GF | GA | GD | Pts |
|---|---|---|---|---|---|---|---|---|
| England (C) | 3 | 3 | 0 | 0 | 17 | 3 | +14 | 6 |
| Scotland | 3 | 2 | 0 | 1 | 16 | 6 | +10 | 4 |
| Ireland | 3 | 1 | 0 | 2 | 6 | 15 | −9 | 2 |
| Wales | 3 | 0 | 0 | 3 | 3 | 18 | −15 | 0 |

Rules for classification: 1) points. The points system worked as follows: 2 points for a win and 1 point for a draw.
(C) Champions

== Results ==
25 February 1893

| England | 6–1 | Ireland |
|---|---|---|
| Gilliat 8', 18', 30'; Smith 43'; Winckworth 60'; Sandilands 75' | | Gaffikin 9' |

Wellington Road, Birmingham
Attendance: 10,000
Referee: Thomas R. Park (Scotland)

13 March 1893

| England | 6–0 | Wales |
|---|---|---|
| Spiksley 25', 43', 88'; Bassett 47'; Goodall 49'; Reynolds 75' |

Victoria Ground, Stoke
Attendance: 10,000
Referee: John Campbell (Scotland)

18 March 1893

| Wales | 0–8 | Scotland |
|---|---|---|
| | | Madden 4', 20', 47', 89'; Barker 25', 30', 40'; Lambie 65' |

Racecourse Ground, Wrexham
Attendance: 4,500
Referee: William H. Stacey (England)

25 March 1893

| Scotland | 6–1 | Ireland |
|---|---|---|
| Sellar 10', 27'; Torrans 20' (o.g.); McMahon 28'; Kelly 60'; Hamilton 70' | | Gaffikin 44' |

Celtic Park, Glasgow
Attendance: 12,000
Referee: John Taylor (Wales)

1 April 1893

| England | 5–2 | Scotland |
|---|---|---|
| Gosling 15'; Cotterill 65'; Spiksley 78', 80', 84' | | Waddell 30'; Sellar 55' |

Athletic Ground, Richmond
Attendance: 16,000
Referee: John Charles Clegg (England)

8 April 1893

| Ireland | 4–3 | Wales |
|---|---|---|
| Peden 5', 50', 58'; Wilton 82' | | Owen 34', 80'; Owen 8' |

Solitude, Belfast
Attendance: 3,000
Referee: John Campbell (Scotland)

== Winning squad ==
- England

| Name | Apps/Goals by opponent | | | Total | |
| Name | (Wales) WAL | (Ireland) IRE | (Scotland) SCO | Apps | Goals |
|---|---|---|---|---|---|
| Fred Spiksley | 1/3 | | 1/3 | 2 | 6 |
| George Cotterill | | 1 | 1/1 | 2 | 1 |
| Billy Bassett | 1/1 | | 1 | 2 | 1 |
| Jack Reynolds | 1/1 | | 1 | 2 | 1 |
| A.H. Harrison | | 1 | 1 | 2 | 0 |
| Bob Holmes | 1 | | 1 | 2 | 0 |
| Walter Gilliat | | 1/3 | | 1 | 3 |
| Rupert Sandilands | | 1/1 | | 1 | 1 |
| Gilbert Smith | | 1/1 | | 1 | 1 |
| William Winckworth | | 1/1 | | 1 | 1 |
| Cunliffe Gosling | | | 1/1 | 1 | 1 |
| John Goodall | 1/1 | | | 1 | 1 |
| Edgar Chadwick | | | 1 | 1 | 0 |
| Leslie Gay | | | 1 | 1 | 0 |
| Johnny Holt | | | 1 | 1 | 0 |
| George Kinsey | | | 1 | 1 | 0 |
| Chris Charsley | | 1 | | 1 | 0 |
| Norman Cooper | | 1 | | 1 | 0 |
| Frederick Pelly | | 1 | | 1 | 0 |
| Albert Smith | | 1 | | 1 | 0 |
| Robert Topham | | 1 | | 1 | 0 |
| Tommy Clare | 1 | | | 1 | 0 |
| Charlie Perry | 1 | | | 1 | 0 |
| J.W. Sutcliffe | 1 | | | 1 | 0 |
| Jimmy Turner | 1 | | | 1 | 0 |
| Jimmy Whitehead | 1 | | | 1 | 0 |
| Joseph Schofield | 1 | | | 1 | 0 |

== Bibliography ==
- Oliver, Guy (1992). The Guinness Record of World Soccer. Guinness. ISBN 0-85112-954-4.
