= 1893–94 in English football =

Football in England
- Season: 1893–94

Men's football
- First Division: Aston Villa
- Second Division: Liverpool
- Northern League: Middlesbrough
- Midland League: Burton Wanderers
- Bristol & District League: Warmley
- FA Cup: Notts County
- FA Amateur Cup: Old Carthusians

The 1893–94 season was the 23rd season of competitive football in England.

== Events ==
Aston Villa won their first top-flight league title this season, beating Sunderland by 6 points. Villa's captain John Devey was the league's top-goal scorer with 20 goals.

The 1893–94 season saw three of the most famous teams in English footballing history join the Second Division: Liverpool, Newcastle United and the first team based in London, Woolwich Arsenal (later Arsenal). Other teams to join the expanded Second Division of 15 teams were Middlesbrough Ironopolis and Rotherham Town. Middlesbrough Ironopolis disbanded at the end of the season, having only completed one season in the Football League.

Liverpool had the most successful season of all the new league clubs, winning the Second Division title and sealing promotion to the First Division by beating Newton Heath in the relegation/promotion test match.

== National team ==
=== Ireland ===
England took a team of professionals to Belfast for the 1894 British Home Championship against Ireland on 3 March 1894.

Joe Reader (West Bromwich Albion) made his solitary England appearance in goal, whilst Henry Chippendale (Blackburn Rovers) earned his single cap at outside right, with his club team-mate Jimmy Whitehead earning his second, and last, cap alongside him. The other débutante was Jimmy Crabtree of Burnley at full-back, who went on to play a total of 14 games for England over the next 8 years. The remainder of the team were experienced internationals, including three members of Aston Villa's championship winning team (Jack Reynolds, John Devey and Dennis Hodgetts) and were expected to secure a comfortable victory.

Despite losing Robert Holmes with an injury after 20 minutes, England took a 2–0 lead by the 55th minute with goals from John Devey and Fred Spiksley. Ireland rallied, however, and with goals in the 70th and 87th minutes, pegged England back to a 2–2 draw.

=== Wales ===
For the match against Wales at Wrexham on 12 March 1894 the selectors decided to field a team consisting entirely of players with Corinthian connections, including three players making their international début. Lewis Vaughan Lodge (Cambridge University) made the first of five appearances at right back; Lodge was an accomplished county cricketer with Hampshire and Durham. Arthur Topham (Casuals), a schoolteacher who had gained a University of Oxford blue, made his solitary England appearance at left half, whilst his brother, Robert made his second, and final, appearance at outside right. The third débutante was John Veitch of Old Westminsters, who played at centre forward.

Wales opened the scoring after 10 minutes, but by half-time England had taken the lead with a goal from John Veitch and an own goal from Everton's Charlie Parry. Veitch scored again early in the second half and completed his hat-trick in the 80th minute, thus joining a select band to score a hat-trick on his début. The fifth goal came from Robert Cunliffe Gosling as England ran out comfortable 5–1 victors.

=== Scotland ===
The final match of the 1894 British Home Championship was against Scotland on 7 April 1894. England needed to secure a victory in order to retain the Championship for the fifth consecutive year. The match was played at Celtic Park, Glasgow and attracted a world record attendance for a full International of 45,107. The selectors chose an experienced eleven, with the only newcomer being Ernest Needham, the hard-tackling Sheffield United half back; "Nudger" Needham went on to make 16 England appearances over the next 8 years.

Scotland opened the scoring after 7 minutes, with a quick reply coming from John Goodall. England managed to keep the Scottish forwards at bay until the 75-minute, when Sandy McMahon was able to get through the England defence. (In 1901, McMahon was one of two players to put four goals past Ireland in an 11–0 victory for the Scots.) England equalized through Jack Reynolds with five minutes remaining and managed to hold on for a 2–2 draw.

The result meant that Scotland won the British Home Championship for the fifth time outright – plus two shared with England.

Date	Venue	Opponents	Score*	Comp	England scorers
3 March 1894	Solitude, Belfast (A)	Ireland	2–2	BHC	John Devey (Aston Villa) (43 mins) & Fred Spiksley (Sheffield Wednesday) (55 mins)
12 March 1894	Racecourse Ground, Wrexham (A)	Wales	5–1	BHC	John Veitch (Old Westminsters) (30, 55 & 80 mins), Charlie Parry (Own goal) (31 mins) and Robert Cunliffe Gosling (Old Etonians) (85 mins)
7 April 1894	Celtic Park, Glasgow (A)	Scotland	2–2	BHC	John Goodall (Derby County) (12 mins) and Jack Reynolds (Aston Villa) (85 mins)

* England score given first

Key

- A = Home match
- BHC = British Home Championship

== Honours ==
Competition	Winner
First Division	Aston Villa (1)
Second Division	Liverpool
FA Cup	Notts County (1)
Home Championship	Scotland

Notes = Number in parentheses is the times that club has won that honour. * indicates new record for competition

== League table ==
=== First Division ===
Pos	Team	Pld	W	D	L	GF	GA	GAv	Pts	Relegation
1	Aston Villa (C)	30	19	6	5	84	42	2.000	44	
2	Sunderland	30	17	4	9	72	44	1.636	38	
3	Derby County	30	16	4	10	73	62	1.177	36	
4	Blackburn Rovers	30	16	2	12	69	53	1.302	34	
5	Burnley	30	15	4	11	61	51	1.196	34	
6	Everton	30	15	3	12	90	57	1.579	33	
7	Nottingham Forest	30	14	4	12	57	48	1.188	32	
8	West Bromwich Albion	30	14	4	12	66	59	1.119	32	
9	Wolverhampton Wanderers	30	14	3	13	52	63	0.825	31	
10	Sheffield United	30	13	5	12	47	61	0.770	31	
11	Stoke	30	13	3	14	65	79	0.823	29	
12	The Wednesday	30	9	8	13	48	57	0.842	26	
13	Bolton Wanderers	30	10	4	16	38	52	0.731	24	
14	Preston North End (O)	30	10	3	17	44	56	0.786	23	Qualification for test matches
15	Darwen (R)	30	7	5	18	37	83	0.446	19	Qualification for test matches
16	Newton Heath (R)	30	6	2	22	36	72	0.500	14	Qualification for test matches

Source: World Football
Rules for classification: 1) Points; 2) Goal average; 3) Goals scored
(C) Champions; (O) Play-off winners; (R) Relegated

=== Second Division ===
Pos	Team	Pld	W	D	L	GF	GA	GAv	Pts	Qualification or relegation
1	Liverpool (C, O, P)	28	22	6	0	77	18	4.278	50	Qualification for test matches
2	Small Heath (O, P)	28	21	0	7	103	44	2.341	42	Qualification for test matches
3	Notts County	28	18	3	7	70	31	2.258	39	Qualification for test matches
4	Newcastle United	28	15	6	7	66	39	1.692	36	
5	Grimsby Town	28	15	2	11	71	58	1.224	32	
6	Burton Swifts	28	14	3	11	79	61	1.295	31	
7	Burslem Port Vale	28	13	4	11	66	64	1.031	30	
8	Lincoln City	28	11	6	11	59	58	1.017	28	
9	Woolwich Arsenal	28	12	4	12	52	55	0.945	28	
10	Walsall Town Swifts	28	10	3	15	51	61	0.836	23	
11	Middlesbrough Ironopolis (Note: Middlesbrough Ironopolis was liquidated at the end of the season.)	28	8	4	16	37	72	0.514	20	Dissolved
12	Crewe Alexandra	28	6	7	15	42	73	0.575	19	
13	Ardwick	28	8	2	18	47	71	0.662	18	Re-elected
14	Rotherham Town	28	6	3	19	44	91	0.484	15	Re-elected
15	Northwich Victoria (R)	28	3	3	22	30	98	0.306	9	Resigned from league

Rules for classification: 1) Points; 2) Goal average; 3) Goals scored
(C) Champions; (O) Play-off winners; (P) Promoted; (R) Relegated

=== Test match results ===
Home team	Score	Away team	Notes
Small Heath	3–1	Darwen	Small Heath promoted, Darwen relegated.
Liverpool	2–0	Newton Heath	Liverpool promoted, Newton Heath relegated.
Preston North End	4–0	Notts County	Both teams remain in their respective divisions
