= 1891–92 British Home Championship =

Tournament details
- Host country: England, Ireland, Scotland and Wales
- Dates: 27 February – 2 April 1892
- Teams: 4

Final positions
- Champions: England (5th title)
- Runners-up: Scotland

Tournament statistics
- Matches played: 6
- Goals scored: 23 (3.83 per match)
- Top scorer(s): (England) Harry Daft (England) Johnny Goodall (Scotland) James Hamilton (Wales) Benjamin Lewis (Scotland) John McPherson (2 goals)

The 1891–92 British Home Championship was an edition of the annual international football tournament played between the British Home Nations. It was won by England who won all three games against their rivals, even though they played two games on the same day against Wales and Ireland, providing a team of amateur players for the Welsh match and professionals against Ireland, both teams forging solid 2–0 victories. Scotland came second, winning their matches against Wales and Ireland, who shared third place after drawing with one another.

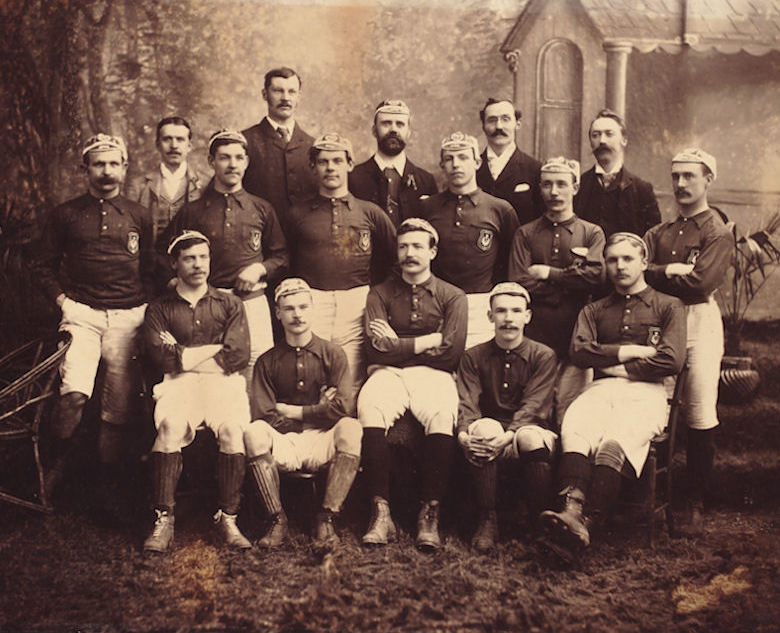
Scotland's team that lost to England in April 1892.

England's double victories came shortly after the Welsh-Irish draw in Bangor and it gave them an immediate advantage over their opponents. The Scottish team then played their games, narrowly beating Ireland in Belfast and defeating Wales by a crushing 6–1 scoreline to equal England's points tally and become favourites. In the final match at Glasgow, England and Scotland played out a decider which England won easily, scoring four early goals to which Scotland could only reply with a single goal of their own.

== Table ==
Team	Pld	W	D	L	GF	GA	GD	Pts
England (C)	3	3	0	0	8	1	+7	6
Scotland	3	2	0	1	10	7	+3	4
Ireland	3	0	1	2	3	6	−3	1
Wales	3	0	1	2	2	9	−7	1

Rules for classification: 1) points. The points system worked as follows: 2 points for a win and 1 point for a draw.
(C) Champions

== Results ==
27 February 1892

Wales	1–1	Ireland
Lewis 22'		Stanfield 87'

Penrhyn Park, Bangor
Attendance: 4,000
Referee: John Campbell (Scotland)

5 March 1892

Wales	0–2	England
		Henfrey 15'; Sandilands 87'

Racecourse Ground, Wrexham
Attendance: 4,500
Referee: James Robertson (Scotland)

5 March 1892

Ireland	0–2	England
		Harry Daft 44', 47'

Solitude, Belfast
Attendance: 8,000
Referee: Robert Harrison (Scotland)

19 March 1892

Ireland	2–3	Scotland
Williamson 42'; Gaffikin 86'		Keillor 17'; Lambie 28'; Ellis 70'

Solitude, Belfast
Attendance: 10,500
Referee: John Taylor (Wales)

26 March 1892

Scotland	6–1	Wales
Thomson 1'; Hamilton 8', 65'; McPherson 15', 44'; Baird 55'		Lewis 87'

Tynecastle, Edinburgh
Attendance: 600
Referee: John Reid (Ireland)

2 April 1892

Scotland	1–4	England
Bell 80'		Chadwick 1'; Goodall 20', 26'; Southworth 25'

Ibrox Park, Glasgow
Attendance: 20,000
Referee: Dr. John Smith (Scotland)

== Winning squad ==
- England

Name	Apps/Goals by opponent			Total	
Name	(Wales) WAL	(Ireland) IRE	(Scotland) SCO	Apps	Goals
Arthur Dunn	1		1	2	0
Dennis Hodgetts		1	1	2	0
Johnny Holt		1	1	2	0
George Toone	1		1	2	0
John Goodall			1/2	1	2
Harry Daft		1/2		1	2
Jack Southworth			1/1	1	1
Edgar Chadwick			1/1	1	1
Arthur Henfrey	1/1			1	1
Rupert Sandilands	1/1			1	1
Billy Bassett			1	1	0
Bob Holmes			1	1	0
Jack Reynolds			1	1	0
Alfred Shelton			1	1	0
Charlie Athersmith		1		1	0
Tommy Clare		1		1	0
John Cox		1		1	0
John Devey		1		1	0
John Pearson		1		1	0
William Rowley		1		1	0
Alf Underwood		1		1	0
Michael Whitham		1		1	0
George Cotterill	1			1	0
Cunliffe Gosling	1			1	0
Anthony Hossack	1			1	0
George Kinsey	1			1	0
Henry Lilley	1			1	0
Joseph Schofield	1			1	0
William Winckworth	1			1	0
