= List of English cricket and football players =

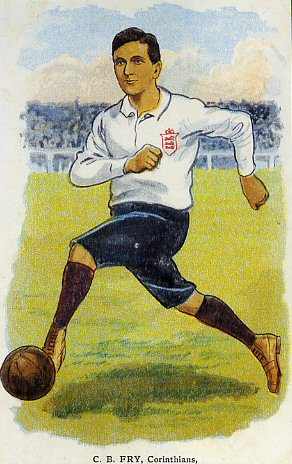
C. B. Fry represented England at both cricket and football, and also held the world record for the long jump.

This is a list of sportspeople who have played both first-class cricket and top level football in England. The list includes thirteen sportspeople who are dual internationals, having represented England's national team at both sports.

Footballers who have not competed at a professional level in the Football League are only eligible for inclusion if they have represented the England national football team.

== Double internationals ==
Name	Cricket club/team	Cricket profile	Football club/team	Football profile
Johnny Arnold	England cricket team; Hampshire County Cricket Club		England national football team; Fulham F.C.; Southampton F.C.	
Andy Ducat	England cricket team; Surrey County Cricket Club		England national football team; Arsenal F.C.; Aston Villa F.C.; Fulham F.C.	
C. B. Fry	England cricket team; Hampshire County Cricket Club; Sussex County Cricket Club		England national football team; Corinthian F.C. (amateur); Portsmouth F.C.; Southampton F.C.	
Tip Foster	England cricket team; Worcestershire County Cricket Club		England national football team; Corinthian F.C. (amateur)	
Leslie Gay	England cricket team; Cambridge University Cricket Club; Hampshire County Cricket Club; Somerset County Cricket Club		England national football team; Corinthian F.C. (amateur)	
Billy Gunn	England cricket team; Marylebone Cricket Club; Nottinghamshire County Cricket Club		England national football team; Notts County F.C.	
Wally Hardinge	England cricket team; Kent County Cricket Club		England national football team; Arsenal F.C.; Newcastle United F.C.; Sheffield United F.C.	
Alfred Lyttelton	England cricket team; Cambridge University Cricket Club; Middlesex County Cricket Club		England national football team; Old Etonians F.C.	
Harry Makepeace	England cricket team; Lancashire County Cricket Club		England national football team; Everton F.C.	
Arthur Milton	England cricket team; Gloucestershire County Cricket Club		England national football team; Arsenal F.C.; Bristol City F.C.	
Jack Sharp	England cricket team; Lancashire County Cricket Club		England national football team; Aston Villa F.C.; Everton F.C.	
Clare Taylor	England women's cricket team; Yorkshire Women cricket team; Otago Women		England women's national football team; Bronte L.F.C.; Liverpool L.F.C.	
Willie Watson	England cricket team; Leicestershire County Cricket Club; Yorkshire County Cricket Club		England national football team; Halifax Town A.F.C.; Huddersfield Town F.C.; Sunderland A.F.C.	

== England cricket team and professional football ==
Name	Cricket club/team	Cricket profile	Football club/team	Football profile
Les Ames	England cricket team; Kent County Cricket Club		Clapton Orient F.C.; Gillingham F.C.	
David Bairstow	England cricket team; Yorkshire County Cricket Club		Bradford City A.F.C.	
Chris Balderstone	England cricket team; Leicestershire County Cricket Club; Yorkshire County Cricket Club		Carlisle United F.C.; Doncaster Rovers F.C.; Huddersfield Town F.C.	
Ian Botham	England cricket team; Durham County Cricket Club; Somerset County Cricket Club; Worcestershire County Cricket Club		Scunthorpe United F.C.	
Brian Close	England cricket team; Somerset County Cricket Club; Yorkshire County Cricket Club		Bradford City A.F.C.; Leeds United F.C.	
Denis Compton	England cricket team; Middlesex County Cricket Club		Arsenal F.C.	
Jack Durston	England cricket team; Middlesex County Cricket Club		Brentford F.C.	
Laurie Fishlock	England cricket team; Surrey County Cricket Club		Aldershot F.C.; Crystal Palace F.C.; Gillingham F.C.; Millwall F.C.; Southampton F.C.	
Wally Hammond	England cricket team; Gloucestershire County Cricket Club		Bristol Rovers F.C.	
Patsy Hendren	England cricket team; Middlesex County Cricket Club		Brentford F.C.; Coventry City F.C.; Manchester City F.C.; Queens Park Rangers F.C.	
Harry Howell	England cricket team; Warwickshire County Cricket Club		Wolverhampton Wanderers F.C.; Accrington Stanley F.C. (1891); Southampton F.C.; Port Vale F.C.	
Walter Keeton	England cricket team; Nottinghamshire County Cricket Club		Sunderland A.F.C.; Nottingham Forest F.C.	
Phil Mead	England cricket team; Hampshire County Cricket Club		Southampton F.C.	
Cyril Poole	England cricket team; Nottinghamshire County Cricket Club		Mansfield Town F.C.	
Walter Robins	England cricket team; Cambridge University Cricket Club; Middlesex County Cricket Club		Nottingham Forest F.C.	
Mordecai Sherwin	England cricket team; Nottinghamshire County Cricket Club		Notts County F.C.	
Arnie Sidebottom	England cricket team; Yorkshire County Cricket Club		Halifax Town A.F.C.; Huddersfield Town F.C.; Manchester United F.C.	
David Smith	England cricket team; Gloucestershire County Cricket Club		Bristol City F.C.; Millwall F.C.	
Micky Stewart	England cricket team; Surrey County Cricket Club		Charlton Athletic F.C.	
William Storer	England cricket team; Derbyshire County Cricket Club		Derby County F.C.	
Frank Sugg	England cricket team; Derbyshire County Cricket Club; Lancashire County Cricket Club; Yorkshire County Cricket Club		Burnley F.C.; Derby County F.C.; Sheffield Wednesday F.C.; Everton F.C.	
Ken Taylor	England cricket team; Yorkshire County Cricket Club		Bradford Park Avenue A.F.C.; Huddersfield Town F.C.	

== First-class cricket and England football team ==
Name	Cricket club/team	Cricket profile	Football club/team	Football profile
C. W. Alcock	Marylebone Cricket Club		England national football team; Wanderers F.C. (amateur)	
Claude Ashton	Cambridge University Cricket Club; Essex County Cricket Club		England national football team; Corinthian F.C. (amateur)	
Morton Betts	Kent County Cricket Club; Middlesex County Cricket Club		England national football team; Old Harrovians F.C. (amateur)	
Francis Birley	Sussex County Cricket Club; Lancashire County Cricket Club		England national football team; Wanderers F.C. (amateur)	
George Brann	Sussex County Cricket Club		England national football team; Swifts F.C. (amateur)	
John Brockbank	Marylebone Cricket Club		England national football team; Cambridge University A.F.C. (amateur)	
Cuthbert Burnup	Cambridge University Cricket Club; Kent County Cricket Club		England national football team; Corinthian F.C. (amateur)	
Lindsay Bury	Cambridge University Cricket Club; Hampshire County Cricket Club		England national football team; Cambridge University A.F.C. (amateur); Old Etonians F.C. (amateur)	
Raich Carter	Derbyshire County Cricket Club		England national football team; Derby County F.C.; Hull City A.F.C.; Sunderland A.F.C.	
Charles Chenery	Surrey County Cricket Club		England national football team; Wanderers F.C. (amateur); Crystal Palace F.C. (amateur)	
Leslie Compton	Middlesex County Cricket Club		England national football team; Arsenal F.C.	
Tommy Cook	Sussex County Cricket Club		England national football team; Brighton & Hove Albion F.C.; Bristol Rovers F.C.	
Norman Cooper	Cambridge University Cricket Club		England national football team; Cambridge University A.F.C. (amateur)	
George Cotterill	Sussex County Cricket Club; Cambridge University Cricket Club		England national football team; Old Brightonians (amateur); Cambridge University A.F.C. (amateur)	
Arthur Cursham	Derbyshire County Cricket Club; Nottinghamshire County Cricket Club		England national football team	
Henry Cursham	Nottinghamshire County Cricket Club		England national football team; Notts County F.C.	
Harry Daft	Nottinghamshire County Cricket Club		England national football team; Corinthian F.C. (amateur); Notts County F.C.; Nottingham Forest F.C.	
John Devey	Warwickshire County Cricket Club		England national football team; Aston Villa F.C.	
Percy de Paravicini	Middlesex County Cricket Club		England national football team; Old Etonians F.C. (amateur)	
John Dixon	Nottinghamshire County Cricket Club		England national football team; Notts County F.C.	
Graham Doggart	Cambridge University Cricket Club; Middlesex County Cricket Club		England national football team; Corinthian F.C. (amateur)	
Ted Drake	Hampshire County Cricket Club		England national football team; Arsenal F.C.; Southampton F.C.	
William Foulke	Derbyshire County Cricket Club		England national football team; Bradford City A.F.C.; Chelsea F.C.; Sheffield United F.C.	
Monty Garland-Wells	Oxford University Cricket Club; Surrey County Cricket Club		Corinthian F.C. (amateur)	
Billy George	Warwickshire County Cricket Club		England national football team; Aston Villa F.C.	
John Goodall	Derbyshire County Cricket Club		England national football team; Derby County F.C.; Glossop F.C.; New Brighton Tower F.C.; Preston North End F.C.; Watford F.C.	
R. Cunliffe Gosling	Cambridge University Cricket Club; Essex County Cricket Club		England national football team; Old Etonians F.C. (amateur)	
Leonard Graham	Essex County Cricket Club		England national football team; Millwall F.C.	
Arthur Grimsdell	East of England cricket team		England national football team; Tottenham Hotspur F.C.	
Fred Hargreaves	Lancashire County Cricket Club		England national football team; Blackburn Rovers F.C.	
Stanley Harris	Cambridge University Cricket Club; Gloucestershire County Cricket Club; Surrey County Cricket Club; Sussex County Cricket Club		England national football team; Cambridge University A.F.C. (amateur); Old Westminsters F.C. (amateur)	
Edward Haygarth	Gloucestershire County Cricket Club; Hampshire County Cricket Club		England national football team; Swifts F.C.	
Mike Hellawell	Warwickshire County Cricket Club		England national football team; Birmingham City F.C.; Huddersfield Town F.C.; Peterborough United F.C.; Queens Park Rangers F.C.	
Arthur Henfrey	Cambridge University Cricket Club		England national football team; Cambridge University A.F.C. (amateur); Corinthians F.C. (amateur)	
Gordon Hodgson	Lancashire County Cricket Club		England national football team; Aston Villa F.C.; Leeds United A.F.C.; Liverpool F.C.	
Anthony Hossack	Cambridge University Cricket Club		England national football team; Corinthian F.C. (amateur)	
Eric Houghton	Warwickshire County Cricket Club		England national football team; Aston Villa F.C.	
Leonard Howell	Surrey County Cricket Club		England national football team; Wanderers F.C. (amateur)	
Geoff Hurst	Essex County Cricket Club		England national football team; Stoke City F.C.; West Bromwich Albion F.C.; West Ham United F.C.	
James Iremonger	Nottinghamshire County Cricket Club		England national football team; Nottingham Forest F.C.	
William Kenyon-Slaney	Marylebone Cricket Club		England national football team; Wanderers F.C. (amateur)	
Robert Kingsford	Surrey County Cricket Club		England national football team; Wanderers F.C. (amateur)	
Arthur Knight	Hampshire County Cricket Club		England national football team; Portsmouth F.C.	
Jack Lee	Leicestershire County Cricket Club		England national football team; Derby County F.C.	
Tinsley Lindley	Cambridge University Cricket Club; Nottinghamshire County Cricket Club		England national football team; Cambridge University A.F.C. (amateur); Nottingham Forest F.C. (amateur)	
William Lindsay	Surrey County Cricket Club		England national football team; Wanderers F.C. (amateur)	
Lewis Vaughan Lodge	Hampshire County Cricket Club		England national football team; Cambridge University A.F.C. (amateur); Corinthian F.C. (amateur)	
Edward Lyttelton	Cambridge University Cricket Club; Middlesex County Cricket Club		England national football team; Cambridge University A.F.C. (amateur)	
Clement Mitchell	Kent County Cricket Club		England national football team; Upton Park F.C. (amateur)	
Billy Moon	Middlesex County Cricket Club		England national football team; Old Westminsters F.C. (amateur)	
Ernest Needham	Derbyshire County Cricket Club		England national football team; Sheffield United F.C.	
Cuthbert Ottaway	Oxford University Cricket Club; Kent County Cricket Club; Middlesex County Cricket Club		England national football team; Oxford University A.F.C. (amateur); Corinthian F.C. (amateur); Crystal Palace F.C. (amateur)	
Percival Parr	Gentlemen of Kent		England national football team; Oxford University A.F.C. (amateur)	
George Raikes	Hampshire County Cricket Club; Oxford University Cricket Club		England national football team; Oxford University A.F.C. (amateur)	
Herbert Rawson	Kent County Cricket Club		England national football team; Royal Engineers A.F.C. (amateur)	
G. O. Smith	Oxford University Cricket Club; Surrey County Cricket Club		England national football team; Corinthian F.C. (amateur); Oxford University A.F.C. (amateur)	
Harry Storer, Jr.	Derbyshire County Cricket Club		England national football team; Burnley F.C.; Derby County F.C.; Grimsby Town F.C.	
Alfred Stratford	Middlesex County Cricket Club		England national football team; Wanderers F.C. (amateur)	
Derek Ufton	Kent County Cricket Club		England national football team; Charlton Athletic F.C.	
Fanny Walden	Northamptonshire County Cricket Club		England national football team; Northampton Town F.C.; Tottenham Hotspur F.C.	
Percy Walters	Oxford University Cricket Club		England national football team; Old Carthusians F.C. (amateur)	
Sam Weaver	Somerset County Cricket Club		England national football team; Sutton Town; Hull City; Newcastle United; Chelsea; Stockport County	
Fred Wheldon	Worcestershire County Cricket Club		England national football team; Aston Villa F.C.; Small Heath F.C.; West Bromwich Albion F.C.	
Herbert Whitfeld	Sussex County Cricket Club		England national football team	
S.W. Widdowson	Nottinghamshire County Cricket Club		England national football team; Nottingham Forest F.C.	
Charles Plumpton Wilson	Cambridge University Cricket Club		England national football team; Corinthian F.C. (amateur)	
Claude Wilson	Surrey County Cricket Club		England national football team; Oxford University A.F.C.	
Jimmy Windridge	Warwickshire County Cricket Club		England national football team; Birmingham F.C.; Chelsea F.C.; Middlesbrough F.C.	
Max Woosnam	Cambridge University Cricket Club		England national football team; Chelsea F.C.; Manchester City F.C.	
Charles Wreford-Brown	Gloucestershire County Cricket Club; Oxford University Cricket Club		England national football team; Old Carthusians F.C. (amateur); Oxford University A.F.C. (amateur)	

== First-class cricket and professional football ==
Name	Cricket club/team	Cricket profile	Football club/team	Football profile
Hubert Ashton	Cambridge University Cricket Club; Essex County Cricket Club		Bristol Rovers F.C.; Clapton Orient F.C.; West Bromwich Albion F.C.; Corinthian F.C. (amateur)	
Ray Bailey	Northamptonshire County Cricket Club		Gillingham F.C.; Northampton Town F.C.	
Gordon Barker	Essex County Cricket Club		Southend F.C.	
Keith Barker	Warwickshire County Cricket Club		Rochdale A.F.C.	
Mike Barnard	Hampshire County Cricket Club		Portsmouth F.C.	
William Bates	Glamorgan County Cricket Club; Yorkshire County Cricket Club		Bolton Wanderers F.C.; Leeds City F.C.	
Don Bennett	Middlesex County Cricket Club		Coventry City F.C.	
Ian Buxton	Derbyshire County Cricket Club		Derby County F.C.; Luton Town F.C.; Notts County F.C.; Port Vale F.C.	
Alec Campbell	Hampshire County Cricket Club		Glossop F.C.; Southampton F.C.	
Tom Clark	Surrey County Cricket Club		Walsall F.C.	
Billy Cook	Lancashire County Cricket Club		Oldham Athletic F.C.	
Lol Cook	Lancashire County Cricket Club		Blackpool F.C.; Gainsborough Trinity F.C.; Stockport County F.C.	
Graham Cross	Leicestershire County Cricket Club		Brighton & Hove Albion F.C.; Chesterfield F.C.; Leicester City F.C.; Preston North End F.C.	
John Cuffe	Worcestershire County Cricket Club; New South Wales		Glossop North End A.F.C.	
Jim Cumbes	Lancashire County Cricket Club; Surrey County Cricket Club; Warwickshire County Cricket Club; Worcestershire County Cricket Club		Aston Villa F.C.; Southport F.C.; Tranmere Rovers F.C.; West Bromwich Albion F.C.	
George Dews	Worcestershire County Cricket Club		Middlesbrough F.C.; Plymouth Argyle F.C.; Walsall F.C.	
Len Dolding	Middlesex County Cricket Club		Chelsea F.C.; Norwich City F.C.	
Alonzo Drake	Yorkshire County Cricket Club		Doncaster Rovers F.C.; Sheffield United F.C.; Birmingham F.C.	
Jack Dyson	Lancashire County Cricket Club		Manchester City F.C.	
Charlie Elliott	Derbyshire County Cricket Club		Coventry City F.C.	
Arthur Foster	Warwickshire County Cricket Club		Birmingham F.C.	
William Fox	Worcestershire County Cricket Club		Middlesbrough F.C.; Newport County A.F.C.; Wolverhampton Wanderers F.C.	
Joe Gatting	Sussex County Cricket Club		Brighton & Hove Albion F.C.	
Freddie Goodwin	Lancashire County Cricket Club		Manchester United F.C.; Leeds United A.F.C.; Scunthorpe United F.C.	
Ian Hall	Derbyshire County Cricket Club		Derby County F.C.; Mansfield Town F.C.	
Jim Hammond	Sussex County Cricket Club		Fulham F.C.	
Bernard Harrison	Hampshire County Cricket Club		Crystal Palace F.C.; Southampton F.C.; Exeter City F.C.	
Bill Harvey	Border; Warwickshire County Cricket Club		Sheffield Wednesday F.C.; Birmingham F.C.	
Ted Hemsley	Worcestershire County Cricket Club		Shrewsbury Town F.C.; Sheffield United F.C.; Doncaster Rovers F.C.	
John Higgins	Worcestershire County Cricket Club		Birmingham F.C.	
Len Hill	Glamorgan County Cricket Club		Swansea Town A.F.C.; Newport County A.F.C.	
Chris Hollins	Oxford University Cricket Club		Charlton Athletic F.C.	
Arthur Holt	Hampshire County Cricket Club		Southampton F.C.	
Henry Horton	Hampshire County Cricket Club; Worcestershire County Cricket Club		Blackburn Rovers F.C.; Bradford Park Avenue A.F.C.; Southampton F.C.	
Albert Iremonger	Nottinghamshire County Cricket Club		Lincoln City F.C.; Notts County F.C.	
Harold Jarman	Gloucestershire County Cricket Club		Bristol Rovers F.C.; Newport County A.F.C.	
Arthur Jepson	Nottinghamshire County Cricket Club		Lincoln City F.C.; Mansfield Town F.C.; Port Vale F.C.; Stoke City F.C.	
Stuart McMillan	Derbyshire County Cricket Club		Bradford City A.F.C.; Clapton Orient F.C.; Derby County F.C.; Gillingham F.C.; Nottingham Forest F.C.; Wolverhampton Wanderers F.C.	
Chris Marples	Derbyshire County Cricket Club		Chesterfield F.C.; Scunthorpe United F.C.; Stockport County F.C.; York City F.C.	
Barrie Meyer	Gloucestershire County Cricket Club		Bristol City F.C.; Bristol Rovers F.C.; Newport County A.F.C.; Plymouth Argyle F.C.	
Frank Mitchell	Warwickshire County Cricket Club		Birmingham City F.C.; Chelsea F.C.; Watford F.C.	
Tony Moor	Scarborough Cricket Club; National Cricket Association XI; Yorkshire League XI		Scarborough F.C.; York City F.C.; Darlington F.C.	
Arthur Mounteney	Leicestershire County Cricket Club		Birmingham F.C.; Grimsby Town F.C.; Leicester Fosse; Preston North End F.C.	
Phil Neale	Worcestershire County Cricket Club		Lincoln City F.C.	
Ron Nicholls	Gloucestershire County Cricket Club		Bristol Rovers; Cardiff City; Bristol City	
Joe North	Middlesex County Cricket Club		Arsenal F.C.; Gillingham F.C.; Norwich City F.C.	
Eddie Presland	Essex County Cricket Club		West Ham United F.C.; Crystal Palace F.C.; Colchester United F.C.	
Ralph Prouton	Hampshire County Cricket Club		Swindon Town F.C.	
Alan Ramage	Yorkshire County Cricket Club		Derby County F.C.; Middlesbrough F.C.	
Don Roper	Hampshire County Cricket Club		Arsenal F.C.; Southampton F.C.	
Sid Russell	Gloucestershire County Cricket Club; Middlesex County Cricket Club		Brentford F.C.	
Malcolm Scott	Northamptonshire County Cricket Club		Newcastle United F.C.; Darlington F.C.; York City F.C.	
Jim Standen	Worcestershire County Cricket Club		Arsenal F.C.; Luton Town F.C.; Millwall F.C.; Portsmouth F.C.; West Ham United F.C.	
Bob Stephenson	Derbyshire County Cricket Club; Hampshire County Cricket Club		Derby County F.C.; Shrewsbury Town F.C.; Rochdale A.F.C.	
Harry Storer, Sr.	Derbyshire County Cricket Club		Arsenal F.C.; Liverpool F.C.	
Ken Suttle	Sussex County Cricket Club		Brighton & Hove Albion F.C.	
Ray Swallow	Derbyshire County Cricket Club		Arsenal F.C.; Derby County F.C.	
Ron Tindall	Surrey County Cricket Club		Chelsea F.C.; Portsmouth F.C.; Reading F.C.; West Ham United F.C.	
Maurice Tompkin	Leicestershire County Cricket Club		Huddersfield Town F.C.	
Horace Wass	Derbyshire County Cricket Club		Chesterfield F.C.; Southport F.C.	
Henry White	Warwickshire County Cricket Club		Arsenal F.C.; Blackpool F.C.; Fulham F.C.; Nelson F.C.; Walsall F.C.	
Levi Wright	Derbyshire County Cricket Club		Derby County F.C.	

== See also ==
- List of Scottish cricket and football players
