= 1894–95 British Home Championship =

Tournament details
- Host country: England, Ireland, Scotland and Wales
- Dates: 9 March – 6 April 1895
- Teams: 4

Final positions
- Champions: England (7th title)
- Runners-up: Wales; Scotland (shared)

Tournament statistics
- Matches played: 6
- Goals scored: 26 (4.33 per match)
- Top scorer: (England) Steve Bloomer (3 goals)

The 1894–95 British Home Championship was an international football tournament played between the British Home Nations. The competition was won by England, who like second placed Wales, did not lose a game. Wales however failed to win one either, scoring three draws and so finishing behind England. Scotland took joint second place with three points gained from a win, draw and a loss. Ireland came last with a single point garnered from their draw with Wales.

England and Ireland played the first match of the competition, the Irish suffering a 9–0 defeat in Derby to give England the immediate advantage. Ireland and Wales then played a 2–2 draw in Belfast before England and Wales drew at the Queen's Club, the only international football match ever played there. Wales finished their competition as Scotland entered it, the teams drawing in Wrexham to give Wales three points in an unbeaten tournament. Scotland beat Ireland in their second game, ending Ireland's tournament with a single point before England and Scotland, level on points, played out the decider at Goodison Park. In the event England were just too strong, easily dismissing their opponents 3–0 to win the trophy.

== Table ==
Team	Pld	W	D	L	GF	GA	GD	Pts
England (C)	3	2	1	0	13	1	+12	5
Wales	3	0	3	0	5	5	0	3
Scotland	3	1	1	1	5	6	−1	3
Ireland	3	0	1	2	3	14	−11	1

Rules for classification: 1) points. The points system worked as follows: 2 points for a win and 1 point for a draw.
(C) Champions

== Results ==
9 March 1895

England	9–0	Ireland
Bloomer 4', 58'; Becton 15', 60'; Goodall 65', 87'; Bassett 30'; Howell 36'; Torrans 3' (o.g.)

County Cricket Ground, Derby
Attendance: 10,000
Referee: James Robertson (Scotland)

16 March 1895

Ireland	2–2	Wales
Gaukrodger 32'; Sherrard 42'		Trainer 10', 85'

Solitude, Belfast
Attendance: 6,000
Referee: William H. Jope (England)

18 March 1895

England	1–1	Wales
Sandilands 74'		Lewis 69'

Queen's Club, London
Attendance: 13,000
Referee: Thomas Park(Scotland)

23 March 1895

Wales	2–2	Scotland
Lewis 10'; Chapman 60'		Madden 30'; Divers 39'

Racecourse Ground, Wrexham
Attendance: 4,000
Referee: William H. Jope (England)

30 March 1895

Scotland	3–1	Ireland
Lambie 1'; Walker 60', 70'		Sherrard 35'

Celtic Park, Glasgow
Attendance: 15,000
Referee: Thomas B. Mitchell (England)

6 April 1895

England	3–0	Scotland
Bloomer 30'; Gibson 35' (o.g.); Smith 44'

Goodison Park, Liverpool
Attendance: 42,500
Referee: John Reid (Ireland)

== Winning squad ==
- England

Name	Apps/Goals by opponent			Total	
Name	(Wales) WAL	(Ireland) IRE	(Scotland) SCO	Apps	Goals
Steve Bloomer		1/2	1/2	2	3
Billy Bassett		1/1	1	2	1
John Goodall		1/2	1	2	1
Jimmy Crabtree		1	1	2	0
Cunliffe Gosling	1		1	2	0
Lewis Lodge	1		1	2	0
J.W. Sutcliffe		1	1	2	0
Frank Becton		1/2		1	2
Steve Smith			1/1	1	1
Raby Howell		1/1		1	1
Rupert Sandilands	1/1			1	1
Johnny Holt			1	1	0
Ernest Needham			1	1	0
Jack Reynolds			1	1	0
Tommy Crawshaw		1		1	0
Bob Holmes		1		1	0
Joseph Schofield		1		1	0
Jimmy Turner		1		1	0
Richard Barker	1			1	0
Gerald Dewhurst	1			1	0
Arthur Henfrey	1			1	0
William Oakley	1			1	0
George Raikes	1			1	0
Gilbert Smith	1			1	0
Hugh Stanbrough	1			1	0
Charles Wreford-Brown	1			1	0
