= Robert Topham =

Robert Topham is the name of:

- Robert Topham (cricketer), English cricketer
- Robert Topham (footballer), English footballer
