= John Veitch (footballer) =

English footballer

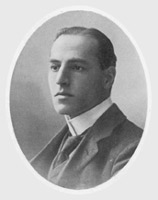
- Born: John Gould Veitch, Jr. 19 July 1869; Kingston Hill, Surrey, England, UK
- Died: 3 October 1914 (aged 45)
- Occupation: English Amateur Footballer
- Father: John Gould Veitch

John Gould Veitch, Jr. (19 July 1869 – 3 October 1914) was an English amateur footballer, who played for the Corinthian club in the 1890s. He made one appearance for England playing at inside left in 1894, in which he scored a hat trick.

Outside football, he was a member of the Exeter-based Veitch Nurseries business.

== Family and education ==
Veitch was born in Kingston Hill, Surrey, the son of John Gould Veitch and his wife, Jane (née Hodge). His father was a horticulturist, one of a long line of renowned plant collectors and breeders. His elder brother James Herbert Veitch became a partner and subsequently owner of the Veitch Nurseries business.

Veitch was educated at Westminster School and was a member of the school football side in 1887. He then went up to Cambridge University (Trinity College), where he won a blue in 1888, 1889, 1890 and 1891.

== Football career ==
On leaving university, he continued to play for Old Westminsters, although he was also a member of the Corinthian amateur club, having made his first appearance for them while still at university on 26 January 1889 in a 1–0 defeat by Preston North End. His next appearance was on 16 February when he scored in a 3–1 victory over Scottish Cup finalists, Celtic.

Over the next few years, his appearances for Corinthian were fairly infrequent, until after he had left university. In the 1891–92 season, he played in thirteen of Corinthian's 16 fixtures, scoring twelve goals, including a hat-trick against Scottish side Renton on 18 April 1892. In the following season he only played nine matches for Corinthian, and would also make a solitary appearance for Slough against Wolverton in a 6-1 defeat, but in 1893–94 he made 17 Corinthian appearances scoring ten goals. In the match against Derby County on 27 March 1894, he scored four goals as Corinthian ran out 5–3 winners.

For the match against Wales at Wrexham on 12 March 1894, the England selectors decided to field a team consisting entirely of players with Corinthian connections, including three players making their international début. Lewis Vaughan Lodge (Cambridge University) made the first of five appearances at right back; Arthur Topham (Casuals) made his solitary England appearance at left half while the third débutante was John Veitch who played at inside left, alongside his fellow Old Westminster Rupert Sandilands.

Wales opened the scoring after 10 minutes, but by half-time England had taken the lead with a goal from Veitch and an own goal from Charlie Parry. Veitch scored again early in the second half and completed his hat-trick in the 80th minute, thus joining a select band to score a hat-trick on his début. The fifth goal came from Robert Cunliffe Gosling as England ran out comfortable 5–1 victors. Veitch is one of five players to have scored a hat-trick on his England debut, yet not make a second appearance.

Veitch started the 1894–95 season with seven goals in the opening three matches, but he was then only able to make the occasional appearance, with his final match for Corinthian coming on 13 April 1898, when he appeared at full-back. In his nine years with Corinthian, he scored 49 goals in 69 appearances.

== After football ==
He joined the family horticulture business as company secretary. He did not enjoy good health for long as he had weak lungs and suffered from premature deafness. Following the death of his brother, James in 1907, John succeeded to the Chelsea, London business. He did not, however, have the ability to run the business successfully, and his uncle Sir Harry Veitch returned to take over control. Following John's death in October 1914 at the age of 45, Sir Harry closed the business.
