= Anthony Hossack =

English footballer

Anthony Henry Hossack (2 May 1867 – 24 January 1925) was an English footballer who made two appearances for England in the 1890s playing at right half.

== Career ==
Hossack was born in Walsall, but was educated at Chigwell School, playing for the school's football team between 1882 and 1886, becoming team captain in his last year. He went up to Jesus College, Cambridge, collecting a "Blue" for Cambridge University in 1890.

After leaving university he joined the Corinthians club, from where he was selected for his first England appearance, against Wales on 5 March 1892. In this game, the selectors selected a team consisting mainly of players with Corinthians connections and awarded eight new caps. England were a little too skilful for the Welsh and ran out 2–0 winners with goals from Arthur Henfrey and Rupert Sandilands.

His second, and final, cap came two years later, also against Wales on 12 March 1894. Once again, the selectors decided to field a team consisting entirely of players with Corinthians connections. Wales opened the scoring after 10 minutes, but by half-time England had taken the lead with a goal from John Veitch and an own goal. Veitch scored again early in the second half and completed his hat-trick in the 80th minute, thus joining a select band to score a hat-trick on his début. The fifth goal came from Robert Cunliffe Gosling as England ran out comfortable 5–1 victors.

Hossack also played cricket for both Cambridge University and Essex. He only made one senior appearance for each club, both against Marylebone Cricket Club (MCC); for the university in May 1889 and for Essex in May 1891.

In 1897 he qualified as a solicitor and settled in Dawlish, Devon. He died at Torquay on 24 January 1925, aged 57.
