= George Cotterill (footballer) =

English footballer (1868–1950)

George Huth Cotterill (4 April 1868 – 11 October 1950 (aged 82)) was an English amateur footballer who made four appearances for England as a forward in the 1890s, captaining the side on his last two appearances. He usually played as an inside right or centre forward.

== Career ==
=== Education ===
Cotterill was born in Brighton, Sussex and was educated at Brighton College where he first showed his all-round athletic ability. He began his football career with the college in 1882 and was appointed team captain two years later, retaining this position for three years before going up to Trinity College, Cambridge in 1887.

At Cambridge University, he was awarded his football blue in each of the years from 1888 to 1891 (including being captain in 1890).

=== Corinthians and England ===
He first played for Corinthian aged 18 in 1886, making his debut against Derby County on 6 November 1886, when he scored in a 3–2 victory. His appearances were infrequent until 1888–89, when he made six appearances, scoring three times including two against Preston North End on 9 March 1889. He also put two goals past Sheffield United on 6 January 1890.

His performances for both Corinthians and Cambridge University ultimately led to a call-up to the England team. He made his international debut against Ireland on 7 March 1891, while still at Cambridge University. For the second year running, England played both Wales and Ireland on the same day, and, for the match against Ireland played at Molineux, Wolverhampton, England selected a predominantly Midlands based team, with five players making their debut. Cotterill played at inside right and was amongst the scorers as England, who were "too skilfull (sic) for the Irish" won 6–1. This match was Tinsley Lindley's final appearance for England, and he marked the occasion with two goals.

On 19 December 1891, Cotterill played for England in an "unofficial" match against Canada, when he scored in a 6–1 victory. Fellow Corinthian, C. B. Fry also played for England in this match. During the 1891–92 season, Cotterill made six appearances for Corinthian scoring seven goals including a hat trick in a 4–4 draw with West Bromwich Albion on 20 February 1892.

On 5 March 1892, England again played simultaneous matches against Wales and Ireland. This time, Cotterill was selected as part of a predominantly amateur team (most of the players were members of the Corinthian club) to play against Wales at the Racecourse Ground, Wrexham, and was one of only three players in the side who had previous international experience. England were "a little too skilful for the Welsh" and ran out 2–0 winners with goals from Arthur Henfrey and Rupert Sandilands.

In April 1892, Corinthians played a multi-sport tournament against the Barbarians rugby club. Cotterill played at inside right in the soccer match which Corinthian won 6–0, with Tinsley Lindley scoring a hat-trick. Cotterill also played in the rugby match, which Corinthian won 16–13, although the match was not a very serious encounter and was described by The Times newspaper as "a very amusing game". The rugby match was followed by an athletics meeting in which C. B. Fry was prominent, winning both the long jump and high jump, with Cotterill winning the "Putting the Weight" with a distance of 34 ft 1in. Finally, the two clubs met a few weeks later in a cricket match in which Cotterill played alongside several other prominent Corinthians, including Fry, Lindley and Charles Wreford-Brown, with the Barbarians winning by four wickets.

By now Cotterill had left University and his primary registration was now with Old Brightonians, although he continued to turn out on a regular basis for Corinthian. He started the 1892–93 season with goals in each of the first three matches for Corinthian, including a hat-trick in a 4–2 victory against Sunderland on 12 November. For the first time, Cotterill was able to join a Corinthian tour of northern England and Scotland, when he played five games in eight days in December and January against professional teams scoring five times.

Cotterill was appointed team captain for the 1893 British Home Championship matches against Ireland and Scotland. For the match against Ireland, played at Perry Barr, Birmingham on 25 February 1893, the selectors again called up a predominantly amateur, Corinthians dominated eleven with another seven débutantes. Amongst the débutantes was Walter Gilliat of Old Carthusians who scored a hat-trick in his only appearance in an England shirt. England "won the game with ease" as further goals from G.O. Smith, William Winckworth and Rupert Sandilands enabled England to run out convincing 6–1 victors.

For the next match, against Wales, the England selectors chose an entirely different, professional eleven players. Cotterill was restored for the final international match of the season at Richmond, London on 1 April 1893 against Scotland who were hoping to avenge their defeat in each of the two previous seasons. England selected a strong eleven, with only Cotterill's fellow Old Brightonian, Leslie Gay making his debut in goal. Cotterill scored England's second goal to bring the scores level after 58 minutes, with England eventually running out 5–2 victors, thus enabling them to claim the championship for the third consecutive season.

In 1893, he again started the season well for Corinthian with a hat-trick in an 11–0 defeat of The Army (Rupert Sandilands scored six). He repeated this on 13 January 1894 in a 4–6 defeat against Aston Villa. Villa had taken a three-goal lead before Cotterill's hat-trick brought the score to 3–4. He finished the 1893–94 season with 16 goals from 13 appearances.

Over the next few seasons, he was only able to make a handful of appearances for Corinthian and he bowed out at the end of the 1897–98 season, having played 65 matches, scoring 53 goals in his thirteen seasons with the club.

In his football career, he also played for Weybridge and Burgess Hill, and represented Surrey and Sussex.

=== Cricket ===
He played seven matches for Cambridge University in 1888–89, but did not obtain his Blue. He also appeared in ten matches for Sussex between 1886 and 1890. In his total first-class career, he played 17 matches and scored 305 runs at an average of 10.16. As a right-arm slow bowler, he claimed three wickets at an average of 38.33.

His father, George Edward Cotterill, also played cricket for Cambridge University (1858–1860), Cambridgeshire (1858) and Sussex (1869–1874), and his uncle, Joseph Cotterill played for Sussex (1870–1888).

=== Other sports ===
He was an all round athlete, rowed for Weybridge Rowing Club, played rugby for Richmond and Surrey, and at university he was a member of the track, field and rowing teams.

=== Military career ===
On 24 July 1886, aged 18, he was appointed to the rank of Lieutenant in the 2nd Volunteer Battalion, the Queen's (Royal West Surrey Regiment).

On the outbreak of the First World War, he enlisted in the 11th Battalion, The Lancashire Fusiliers, being temporarily promoted to the rank of Captain on 22 September 1914. He subsequently achieved the rank of Major.

He died at Llandaff, Glamorgan, Wales on 1 October 1950, aged 82.
