= Bernard Middleditch =

English footballer

Personal information
- Full name: Bernard Middleditch
- Date of birth: 1870
- Place of birth: Highgate, England
- Date of death: 3 October 1949 (aged 78–79)
- Position: Right half

Senior career*
| Years | Team | Apps | (Gls) |
- Corinthian

International career
| 1897 | England | 1 | (0) |
- * Club domestic league appearances and goals

Bernard Middleditch (1870 – 3 October 1949) was an English international footballer, who played as a right half.

== Career ==
Born in Highgate, Middleditch played for Corinthian, and earned one cap for England in 1897.
