= Alban Harrison =

English footballer

Personal information
- Full name: Alban Hugh Harrison
- Date of birth: 30 November 1869
- Place of birth: Bredhurst, England
- Date of death: 15 August 1943 (aged 73)
- Place of death: Royal Tunbridge Wells, England
- Position: Full back

Youth career
- 1887–1888: Westminster School

Senior career*
Years	Team	Apps	(Gls)
1889–1891	Cambridge University		
- Old Westminsters
- Corinthian

International career
1893	England	2	(0)
- * Club domestic league appearances and goals

Alban Hugh Harrison (30 November 1869 – 15 August 1943) was an English international footballer who played as a full back.

== Career ==
While playing for Old Westminsters, Harrison earned two caps for the England national side in 1893. Harrison also played for Cambridge University and Corinthian, captaining the former.
