= Athletic Ground, Richmond =

Rugby ground in London, England

Athletic Ground
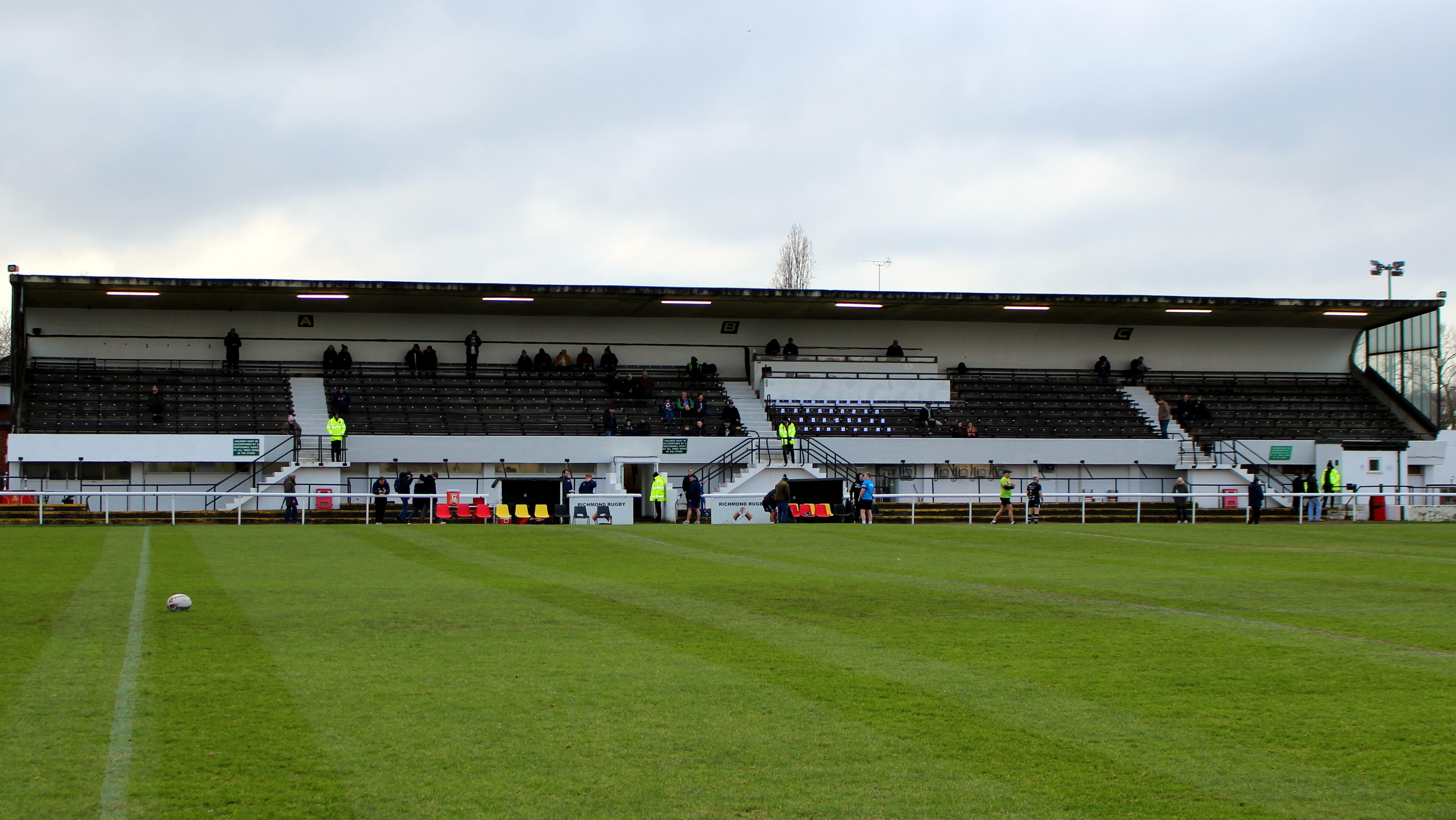
- Interactive map of Athletic Ground
- Location: The Athletic Ground, Twickenham Road, Richmond, London TW9 2SF
- Coordinates: 51°28′0″N 0°18′12″W
- Owner: Richmond Athletic Association
- Capacity: 4,500 (1,000 seats)

Construction
- Built: 1886; 140 years ago

Tenants
- Richmond (1889—1998, 2000–); London Broncos Academy (2021–2023); London Scottish (1894—1997, 1999–); Old Tonbridgians (2009)

Built in 1886, and located in Richmond upon Thames, London, the Athletic Ground is a rugby ground, managed by Richmond Athletic Association, home to RFU Championship side Richmond and National League 1 side London Scottish. The first team pitch has a stand capable of seating around 1,000 people with another 3,500 standing for a total capacity of 4,500, though in the past temporary stands have been erected in the considerable space around the pitch to boost the seated capacity with a reported capacity of 7,300, including 1,300 seated, back in the 1990s. Lower league side, Old Tonbridgians RFC, also play home games at the Athletic Ground. As well as rugby, a small football team by the name of Mortlake FC play at this ground.

The original facilities include six other pitches and two bars which are available for hire, a canteen, changing rooms, a physio room, a shop and offices. Part of Old Deer Park, a huge continuous leisure area, the Athletic Ground was bordered by the Pools on the Park leisure centre, Royal Mid-Surrey Golf Club, and health centre, and also a driving range. Three pitches have been marked out on the driving range which closed down in the 1990s as did Richmond Bowls Club which is now used as a play area for neighbouring Falcons School.

The Athletic Ground is also host to the National Surveyor 7s, Lloyds Insurance 7s, Neptune City 7s, Law Society 7s, Middlesex Club 7s, NABs Media 7s and Rugby Rocks.

The complex has considerable parking facilities for its size, and is often used as a stop-off for fans on their way to Twickenham Stadium.

Rugby Union club London Scottish announced they would leave the Athletic Ground after 127 years following the 2020–21 season. However as Scottish 1st XV would not participate in the Championship season and there would be no community leagues in 2020–21 they would not play at the Athletic Ground in 2020–21. It was later confirmed they would remain at the Athletic Ground.

In February 2021 it was confirmed that rugby league side London Broncos would move their academy to the Athletic Ground for three seasons from 2021.

== International rugby union ==
England played ten Test matches at the Athletic Ground between 1891 and 1909. In five of those matches against Scotland (listed below), England failed to win:

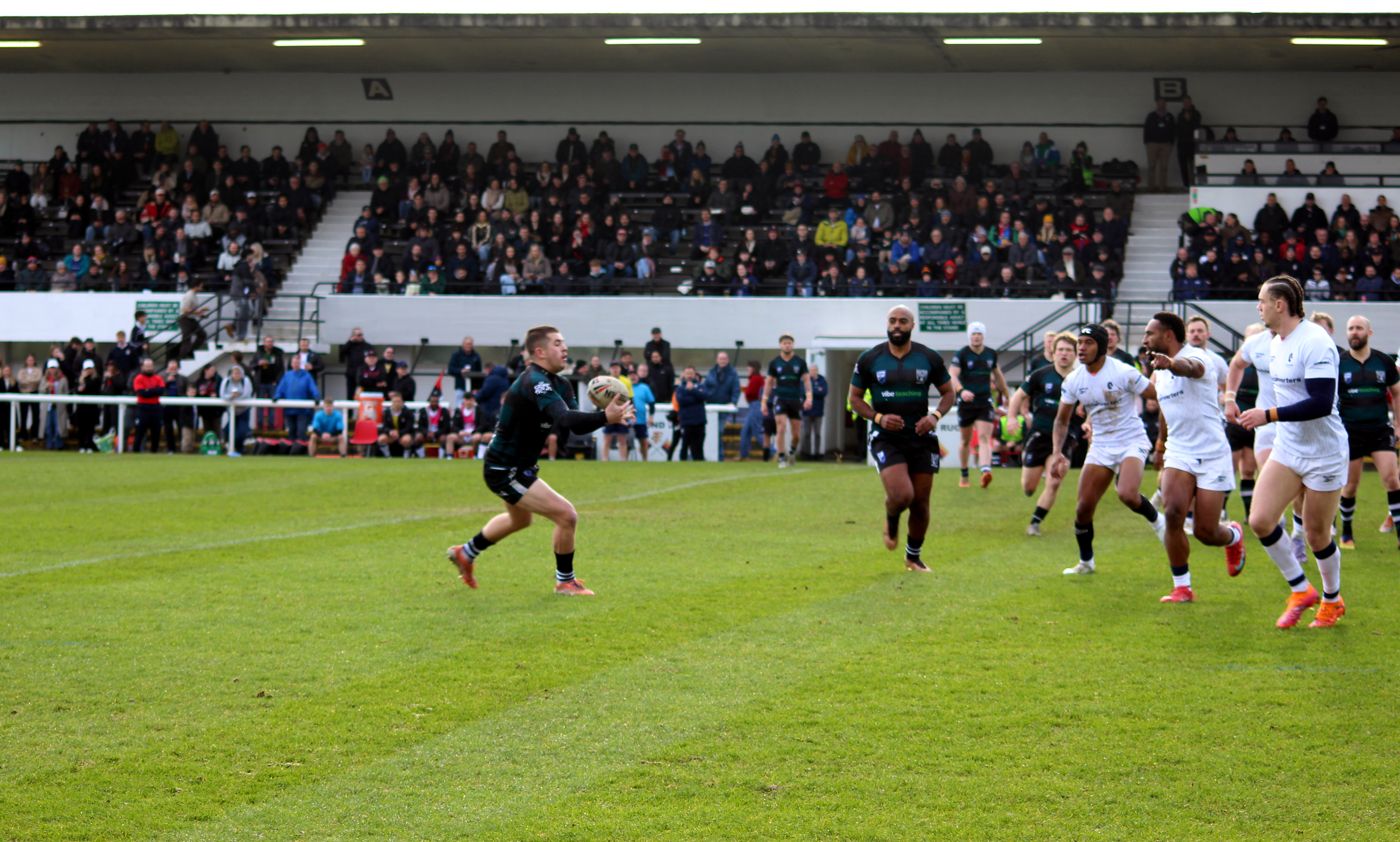
The Wests Warriors with ball against the London Broncos in the Challenge Cup at the Athletic Ground, Richmond in 2026

Date	Competition	Home team		Away team	
7 March 1891	1891 Home Nations Championship	England	3	Scotland	9
9 March 1895	1895 Home Nations Championship	England	3	Scotland	6
5 February 1898	1898 Home Nations Championship	England	6	Ireland	9
3 February 1900	1900 Home Nations Championship	England	15	Ireland	4
21 March 1903	1903 Home Nations Championship	England	6	Scotland	10
18 March 1905	1905 Home Nations Championship	England	0	Scotland	8
13 January 1906	1906 Home Nations Championship	England	6	Wales	16
5 January 1907	Friendly	England	41	France	13
8 February 1908	1908 Home Nations Championship	England	13	Ireland	3
20 March 1909	1909 Home Nations Championship	England	8	Scotland	18

== Football ==
In the association football code England enjoyed more success against Scotland, playing one match here in 1893 as part of the 1893 British Home Championship and winning 5-2.

The FA Amateur Cup final was also played here in 1894, with Old Carthusians F.C. beating Casuals F.C. 2–1.
