= Robin Topham =

English cricketer (born 1952)

Personal information
- Full name: Robert Denham Nigel Topham
- Born: 17 July 1952 (age 74); Trowbridge, Wiltshire, England
- Batting: Right-handed

Domestic team information
- Years: Team
- 1976: Oxford University

Career statistics
Competition	First-class
Matches	4
Runs scored	91
Batting average	15.16
100s/50s	0/0
Top score	31
Catches/stumpings	2/–
- Source: Cricinfo, 10 April 2020

Robert Denham Nigel "Robin" Topham (born 17 July 1952) is an English former first-class cricketer.

Topham was born at Trowbridge in July 1952. He was educated at Shrewsbury School and the Australian National University, and later studied at St Edmund Hall, Oxford where he played first-class cricket for Oxford University in 1976. He made four first-class appearances for Oxford, against county opposition in the form of Glamorgan, Warwickshire and Sussex, in addition to playing against Cambridge University in The University Match. He scored 91 runs in his four matches, at an average of 15.16 and with a highest score of 31.

Topham is a mathematics teacher at King's College, Auckland.
