= Norman Cooper (sportsman) =

English sportsman (1870–1920)

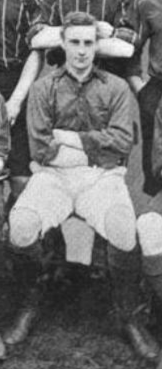
- With Old Brightonians in 1894

Personal information
- Full name: Norman Charles Cooper
- Date of birth: 12 July 1870
- Place of birth: Norbiton, Surrey, England
- Date of death: 30 July 1920 (aged 50)
- Place of death: Hampden Park, East Sussex, England
- Position: Wing half

Senior career*
Years	Team	Apps	(Gls)
- Cambridge University
- Corinthian
- Old Brightonians

International career
1893	England	1	(0)
- * Club domestic league appearances and goals

Norman Charles Cooper (12 July 1870 – 30 July 1920) was an English sportsman who represented the England national football team and played first-class cricket with Cambridge University.

Cooper was educated at Brighton College and Trinity Hall, Cambridge.

A wing-half, Cooper's only international cap came against Ireland at Perry Barr in the 1893 British Home Championship, with England winning 6–1.

Cooper was a right-handed opening batsman for Cambridge University at first-class cricket level and played 11 matches for them, one a combined team with Oxford. He also played a match for the CI Thornton's XI and in 1892 took the field for the HT Hewett's XII against Cambridge after he switched sides when his intended opponents revealed they had only 10 players.
