= Arthur Topham =

English footballer (1869–1931)

Personal information
- Full name: Arthur George Topham
- Date of birth: 19 February 1869
- Place of birth: Elson, Ellesmere, England
- Date of death: 18 May 1931 (aged 62)
- Place of death: Eastbourne, England
- Position: Left half

Youth career
- 1890: Oxford University

Senior career*
Years	Team	Apps	(Gls)
1891–1894	Casuals		
- Chiswick Park
1892–1903	Eastbourne		
1893–1897	Corinthian (guest)		

International career
1894	England	1	(0)
- * Club domestic league appearances and goals

Arthur George Topham (19 February 1869 – 18 May 1931) was an English international footballer who played as a left half.

== Early and personal life ==
Topham was born on 19 February 1869, in Elson, near Ellesmere, as the youngest of six children. His brother Robert was also a footballer. He attended Oswestry School, followed by Keble College, Oxford, where he earned a Blue in 1890.

== Career ==
Topham played club football for Casuals, Eastbourne and Chiswick Park, and also guested for Corinthian. He was a runner-up in the FA Amateur Cup in 1894.

He played for Eastbourne between 1892 and 1903, when he retired.

He earned one cap for England in 1894.

== Later life and death ==
Topham later worked as a private tutor, dying on 18 May 1931, aged 62, in Eastbourne.
