= George Gaffikin =

Irish association footballer

Personal information
- Full name: George John Gaffikin
- Date of birth: 17 May 1868
- Place of birth: Belfast, Ireland
- Date of death: 31 December 1935
- Place of death: Belfast, Ireland
- Position: Inside right

Senior career*
| Years | Team | Apps | (Gls) |
| 1886-1898 | Linfield | 181 | (103) |

International career
| 1890-1895 | Ireland Amateurs | 15 | (4) |
- * Club domestic league appearances and goals

George Gaffikin (17 May 1868 – 31 December 1935) was an Irish footballer who played as an inside right.

== Club career ==
Gaffikin was a founder member of Linfield, playing in their first ever game, a friendly game against Lisburn Distillery on 11 September 1886., and went on to make 181 appearances in his twelve years with the club, scoring 103 goals. Gaffikin was part of the Linfield team which won the club's first trophy, the Irish Cup in March 1891, scoring in a 4-2 victory over Ulster, with Linfield also going on to win a domestic double the same season, a feat they repeated for the following three seasons, and again in 1895, with Gaffikin scoring in the 10-1 Irish Cup win against Bohemians. Gaffikin also scored twice in the final of the Belfast Charity Cup in May 1891, with Linfield defeating Ulster 7-1. They won this competition for the next four seasons.

== International career ==
Gaffikin made his debut for Ireland during the 1890-91 British Home Championship in a 2-5 defeat to Wales. He made a total of 15 international appearances, scoring against Wales the following season during the 1891-92 British Home Championship as Ireland recorded a 7-2 win, and then in three successive international games, against Scotland, and the following season against England and Scotland in the 1892-93 British Home Championship tournament. During the game against England, Ireland were awarded the first penalty kick in international football, after Gaffikin was tripped, although Sam Torrans' kick was saved.
