= John Cox (footballer) =

English footballer

Personal information
- Full name: John Davies Cox
- Date of birth: 31 December 1870
- Place of birth: Spondon, England
- Position: Right half

Senior career*
Years	Team	Apps	(Gls)
1891–1899	Derby County	212	(7)

International career
1892	England	1	(0)
- * Club domestic league appearances and goals

John Davies Cox (born 31 December 1870) was an English international footballer, who played as a right half.

== Career ==
Born in Spondon, Cox played professionally for Derby County, and earned one cap for England in 1892.
