= Walter Gilliat =

English footballer and minister

Walter Evelyn Gilliat (22 July 1869 – 2 January 1963) was an English amateur footballer who played for Oxford University and Old Carthusians, as well as making one appearance in the England national side, when he scored three goals. He subsequently became an ordained minister in the Church of England

== Career ==
=== Education ===
Gilliat was born at Stoke Poges, Buckinghamshire and was educated at Charterhouse School, where he was a member of the school football team for two years. He then went up to Magdalen College, Oxford, and was awarded his blue in 1892.

=== Football career ===
After graduating, he played football for the Old Carthusians and was a member of the Corinthian amateur club, although he never played any matches for them.

He made his one international appearance at outside right against Ireland on 25 February 1893, in a team consisting mainly of players with Corinthian connections. He scored a hat-trick in the first 30 minutes as England won comfortably 6-1 but was never selected again, thus becoming one of only five players to have scored three goals in their only England international appearance. Gilliat was an "excellent dribbler of the ball, who would certainly have played more (for England) had it not been for his religious beliefs."

=== Ministry ===
He was ordained in 1895 and served as a curate at Woking and Tunbridge Wells, before becoming vicar of Iver between 1901 and 1920. He then became Rector of Sevenoaks until 1929 when he retired to Woking.

He died in Woking on 2 January 1963 aged 93 years old. His son was the cricketer and footballer Ivor Gilliat.
