= George Kinsey =

English footballer

Personal information
- Date of birth: 20 June 1866
- Place of birth: Burton upon Trent, England
- Date of death: 1936 (aged 70)
- Place of death: Birmingham, England
- Position: Left half

Senior career*
Years	Team	Apps	(Gls)
- Burton Crusaders
- Burton Swifts
?–1891	Birmingham St George's		
1891–1893	Wolverhampton Wanderers	73	(3)
1894	Aston Villa	3	(0)
1895–1896	Derby County	36	(0)
1896–1897	Notts County	4	(0)
1897–1900	Bristol Eastville Rovers/Bristol Rovers	5	(0)
1900–?	Burton Swifts	8	(1)
- Burton Early Closing

International career
1892–1896	England	4	(0)
- * Club domestic league appearances and goals

George Kinsey (20 June 1866 – 1936) was a professional footballer, who was capped four times by the England national football team, and also won the FA Cup in 1893 with Wolverhampton Wanderers.

Kinsey was born in Burton upon Trent, and began playing with his home town teams Burton Crusaders and Burton Swifts, before joining Birmingham St George's. In 1891 he moved to Wolverhampton Wanderers, where he played 73 times in The Football League, and took part in the 1893 FA Cup Final.

He played for Aston Villa, Derby County and Notts County in The Football League between 1894 and 1897, before joining Bristol Eastville Rovers. He played in the Western League, Birmingham & District League and Southern League for Rovers, who were renamed Bristol Rovers at the end of his first year with the club, and he made five appearances in the latter competition.

He returned to his home town to end his career, firstly re-joining Burton Swifts in 1900, and later moving on to Burton Early Closing. He died in the final quarter of 1936 at the age of 69.

== Sources ==
- Joyce, Michael (2012). Football League Players' Records 1888–1939. SoccerData. ISBN 978-1-905891-61-0.
- Byrne, Stephen; Jay, Mike (2003). Bristol Rovers Football Club - The Definitive History 1883-2003. Stroud: Tempus. ISBN 0-7524-2717-2.
