= Jimmy Whitehead =

English footballer

Personal information
- Full name: James Whitehead
- Date of birth: 1870
- Place of birth: Church, Lancashire, England
- Date of death: 1929 (aged 58–59)
- Position: Inside right

Senior career*
| Years | Team | Apps | (Gls) |
- Peel Bank Rovers
| 1890–1892 | Accrington | 73 | (23) |
| 1892–1897 | Blackburn Rovers | 86 | (22) |
| 1897–1898 | Manchester City | 24 | (7) |
- Accrington Stanley
| Total | | 183 | (52) |

International career
| 1893–1894 | England | 2 | (0) |
- * Club domestic league appearances and goals

James W. Whitehead (1870–1929) was an English footballer who played at both professional and international levels as an inside right.

== Career ==
Born in Church, Lancashire, Whitehead played in the Football League for Accrington, Blackburn Rovers and Manchester City. He also earned two caps for the England national side between 1893 and 1894.
