= Joseph Schofield =

English footballer

Joseph Schofield (born 1881) was an English footballer. His regular position was as a forward. He was born in Wigan, Lancashire. He played for Manchester United, Brynn Central, Ashton Town, and Stockport County.
