= Robert Topham (footballer) =

English footballer

Personal information
- Date of birth: 3 November 1867
- Place of birth: Ellesmere, England
- Date of death: 31 August 1931 (aged 63)
- Height: 5 ft 11 in (1.80 m)
- Position: Outside right

Senior career*
Years	Team	Apps	(Gls)
- Oswestry
1891–1896	Wolverhampton Wanderers		
- Casuals
- Chiswick Park
1894–1898	Corinthian		

International career
1893–1894	England	2	(0)
- * Club domestic league appearances and goals

Robert Topham (3 November 1867 – 31 August 1931) was an English international footballer, who played as an outside right.

== Career ==
Born in Ellesmere, Topham played for Wolverhampton Wanderers, Corinthian and Casuals, and earned two caps for England between 1893 and 1894.

He was part of the Corinthian side that competed in the 1898 Sheriff of London Charity Shield against league winners Sheffield United, winning the free kick that Wilfrid Foster scored in the 1–1 replay which resulted in the honour being shared.

His brother Arthur was also a footballer.
