= Old Westminsters F.C. =

Association football club in England

Coordinates: 51°28′33.88″N 0°16′00.89″W

Old Westminsters
- Full name: Old Westminsters Football Club
- Nickname: the Pinks
- Founded: 1880; 146 years ago
- Ground: Bacons College Sports Ground
- League: Arthurian League; Division One
- 2022–23: Arthurian League; Division One, 3rd
Home colours

Old Westminsters F.C. is an association football club composed of former pupils of Westminster School, London, England. They play in the Arthurian League.

== History ==
Westminster has an historic joint claim to a major role in the development of association football, which remains the school's largest sport. During the 1840s at both Westminster and Charterhouse, pupils' surroundings meant they were confined to playing their football in the cloisters, making the rough and tumble of the handling game that was developing at other schools such as Rugby impossible, and necessitating a new code of rules. During the formulation of the rules of association football in the 1860s, representatives of Westminster and Charterhouse also pushed for a passing game, in particular rules that allowed forward passing ("passing on"). Other schools (in particular Eton and Harrow) favoured a dribbling game with a tight offside rule. By 1867 the Football Association had chosen in favour of the Westminster and Charterhouse game and adopted an offside rule that permitted forward passing. The modern forward-passing game emerged as a direct consequence.

From the 1860s, many of the school's old boys sought to continue playing some sort of football game after leaving. In 1861, for instance, an eleven from Trinity College, Cambridge, eight of whom were Old Westminsters, returned to their alma mater for a friendly match. Formal Old Westminster sides played the school regularly in the 1860s.

Many former Westminster pupils, including Walpole Vidal and W.J. Dixon, also played for ad hoc or gentlemen's teams in the 1860s and 1870s. The Crusaders club was formed out of former Westminster and Eton pupils, and the Wanderers was also a favoured club for Westminster pupils. At Christmas 1867, because a proposed association match between Eton College and Westminster School could not take place, a match was instead held between Old Westminsters and Old Etonians, the first proper 'external' match for a side made up solely of Westminster old boys.

As these other clubs took off, there was less need for a formal Old Westminster side, until, with increasing numbers of footballers coming out of the schools as well as from new sporting clubs, players gradually tended to prefer to play for a club that was closer to their ideals or hearts. Consequently, with clubs such as the Old Etonians and Old Harrovians coming to the fore, in 1880 a formal Old Westminsters club was formed.

=== FA Cup entries ===
Colours in the 19th century
Home colours

The club's formation was slightly too late to achieve success on a national level, as clubs from outside London were beginning to take over the game. With the FA Cup being run on a regional basis until the latter rounds, the Old Westminsters were often the best side from the capital, reaching the quarter-final on three occasions. The closest the club came to reaching the semi-final was in 1883–84, after a number of leading clubs had been disqualified for professionalism; the club lost 1–0 to Queen's Park of Glasgow at the Kennington Oval.

The true gap to professionals was shown in 1885–86, when the club easily defeated Hotspur of Battersea, the Old Brightonians, and the amateur Romford; the disqualification of Bolton Wanderers for fielding ineligible professionals in an earlier round meant the first professional side the club met was West Bromwich Albion in the quarter-finals, and the Albion won 6–0. The following year the club beat three old boy teams, and beat Partick Thistle at the Oval with a last-minute winner, but was easily beaten by Glasgow Rangers. The Westminsters could not field their strongest side while Rangers brought in guest players from Vale of Leven F.C. and Hibernian F.C., who had not entered the competition.

After qualifying rounds were brought in, in 1888–89, the club was exempted to the first round proper, but was unlucky to be drawn away to Burnley of the Football League; with both sides unable to field their best sides, Burnley because of qualification rules and Westminsters because of the journey, the match ended 4–3 to the home side, after the Westminsters pulled the score back from 3–1 at half-time to 3–3 near the end. The Westminsters protested the result, on the basis that the match finished in a snowstorm, to no avail.

The club was exempted again for the next two years, losing to Stoke in 1889–90 and scratching to West Bromwich Albion in 1890–91 after being unable to raise an eleven, and, once the exemption was over, won through to the first round proper in 1891–92; yet again the club was drawn against West Bromwich Albion, but this time at home, so the game took place at the Oval, in front of a crowd of 6–7,000. The 3–2 defeat to Albion was the club's last match in the FA Cup proper, and a loss to Luton Town in the third qualifying round in 1893–94 was the club's last match in the competition itself.

=== Amateur competitions ===
At the amateur level, the club was originally very successful, winning the London Senior Cup in 1887 (joint winners), 1888, 1890, 1892 and 1893. The Old Westminsters also had a share in the 1886 win; the champion club – Ashburnham Rovers – was a short-lived collaboration between current and former pupils of the school, although it was "practically" an Old Westminster side. The club has never won the Arthur Dunn Cup for old boy teams, but has twice been runner-up.

== Colours ==
The club originally wore pink and white, as a contrast to the school's plain pink. The current side wears pink shirts and black shorts.

== Ground ==
During its Victorian heyday, the club played at Vincent Square, although its more prestigious friendlies and Cup ties were played at the Kennington Oval. The club currently plays at Bacon's College sports ground in Rotherhithe.

== England internationals ==
Several Old Westminsters were capped for England:

- Stanley S. Harris (4 caps)
- Alban Harrison (2 caps)
- Billy Moon (7 caps)
- Rupert Sandilands (5 caps)
- John Veitch (1 cap)
- William Winckworth (2 cap)

On 25 February 1893 Alban Harrison, Rupert Sandilands and William Winckworth, played together in the match against Ireland, with Winckworth and Sandilands both scoring in a 6-1 victory.

== Records ==
- FA Cup
  - Quarter Finals 1883–84, 1885–86, 1886–87
- FA Amateur Cup
  - Quarter Finals 1896–97
- London Senior Cup
  - Winners 1886–87, 1887–88, 1889–90, 1891–92, 1892–93
- London Charity Cup
  - Winners 1888–89
