= Casuals F.C. =

English amateur football club

Casuals
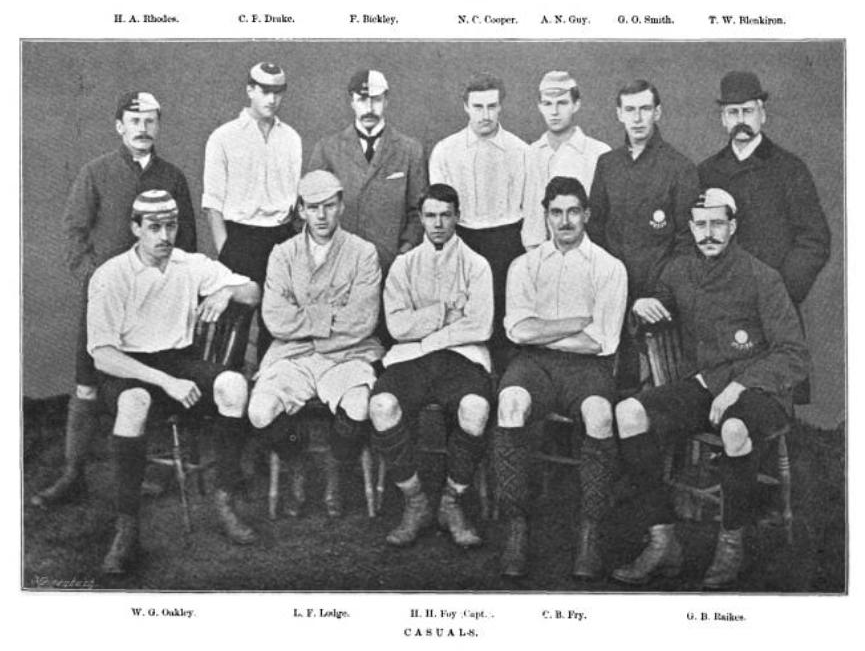
- 1894
- Full name: Casuals Football Club
- Founded: 1883
- Dissolved: 1939 (merged with Corinthian FC to create Corinthian-Casuals FC)
Home colours

Casuals F.C. were an amateur football club based in London, formed in 1883. They merged with Corinthian in 1939 to form the Corinthian-Casuals, a club which still exists.

== History ==
The club was formed in 1883, and was originally made up of players exclusively of the old boys of Eton School, Westminster School and Charterhouse School but were quickly expanded to include players from all Universities and public schools. In the early days they would field up to five teams a week in order to meet all engagements.

For the duration of the 1890 FA Cup, the team merged with that of the Old Carthusians, who had won the trophy nine years previously.

They were founder members of the Isthmian League in 1905 though spent six seasons in the Southern Amateur League, 1907 to 1913, before returning to the Isthmian League for the 1913/14 season. Casuals won the FA Amateur Cup in 1936. In their early days playing the game they would tour the country like the Corinthians, and sometimes play more than one game in the same day, and at different venues, not at the same ground. They would also play more than once or twice a week, including playing everyday except Sunday.

In 1913, they defeated New Crusaders by 3 goals to 2 in the final of the AFA Senior Cup, after the Casuals scored a winning goal in the final minute.

In 1939, the club merged with Corinthian following a meeting on 4 January to form a new club Corinthian-Casuals at the end of the season. The merged club remains active and currently plays in the Combined Counties Premier Division South following back-to-back relegations from the Isthmian League Premier and South Central divisions in 2023 and 2024 respectively.

== Colours ==
The club's colours were pink and chocolate; the colours came from the pink of Westminster School and the maroon of Charterhouse School.

== Ground ==
The club's first ground was on Wandsworth Common, with the Surrey Hotel being used for facilities. The club moved to Wormwood Scrubs in 1890, and later played at the following grounds:

- 1905–14: Campdale Road, Tufnell Park
- 1919–20: Essex County Cricket Club
- 1920–21: East Molesey Cricket Club
- 1921–22: St Joseph's Road, Guildford
- 1922–25: Crystal Palace
- 1925–39: Richmond Road, the home of Kingstonian

== England internationals ==
Five Casuals players were capped for England.

The full list of England players (with the number of caps received whilst registered with Casuals F.C.) were:

- Richard Raine Barker (1 cap)
- Fred Ewer (2 caps)
- Bernard Joy (1 cap)
- Arthur Topham (1 cap)
- Robert Topham (1 cap)

== Honours ==
Winners

- London Senior Cup: 1887 (shared)
- London Charity Cup: 1891, 1894, 1897, 1901, 1904, 1905
- AFA Senior Cup: 1908, 1913
- Surrey Senior Cup: 1930
- FA Amateur Cup: 1936

Finalists

- London Senior Cup: 1888, 1889, 1893, 1895, 1896
- FA Amateur Cup: 1894
- AFA Senior Cup: 1909
- Isthmian League: 1937
