= Jack Reynolds (footballer, born 1869) =

Footballer (1869–1917)

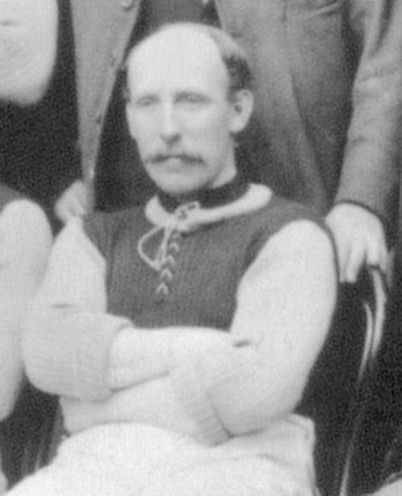
- Reynolds with Aston Villa in 1897

Personal information
- Full name: John Reynolds
- Date of birth: 21 February 1869
- Place of birth: Blackburn, England
- Date of death: 12 March 1917 (aged 48)
- Place of death: Sheffield, England
- Height: 5 ft 4 in (1.63 m)
- Positions: Midfielder; forward

Youth career
- Witton
- 1884–1885: Blackburn Rovers
- 1886: Blackburn Park Road

Senior career*
Years	Team	Apps	(Gls)
1886–1889	East Lancashire Regiment		
1888–1890	Distillery		
1890–1891	Ulster		
1891–1892	West Bromwich Albion	17	(2)
1892	Droitwich Town		
1892–1893	West Bromwich Albion	20	(1)
1893–1897	Aston Villa	96	(17)
1897	Celtic	4	(1)
1898	Southampton	2	(0)
1898–1899	Bristol St George		
1899–1902	Royston F.C. (Yorkshire)		
1902–1903	Grafton F.C. (New Zealand)		
1903	Stockport County	1	(0)
1904–1905	Willesden Town		

International career
1890–1891	Ireland	5	(1)
1892–1897	England	8	(2)
1890s	English League XI	4	
- * Club domestic league appearances and goals

John Reynolds (21 February 1869 – 12 March 1917) was a footballer who played for, among others, West Bromwich Albion, Aston Villa and Celtic. He was the first player to represent both Ireland and England internationally.

Reynolds won the FA Cup with West Bromwich Albion in 1892 and was a prominent member of the successful Aston Villa team of the 1890s, winning three English League titles and two FA Cups, including a double in 1897.

As an international he played five times for Ireland before it emerged that he was actually English and he subsequently played eight times for England. He is the only player to score for and against England (barring own goals)

== Club career ==
=== Early years ===
Although born in Blackburn, Lancashire, Reynolds grew up in Ahoghill in County Antrim, Ireland and attended schools in Portglenone and Ballymena. By the age of 15 he was back in Blackburn playing with, among others Blackburn Rovers reserves. In December 1886 he joined the British Army and was posted back to Ireland with the East Lancashire Regiment. While in Ireland he also played for the regimental team. In 1888 he also began playing for Distillery where his teammates included Olphert Stanfield and Billy Crone. He also played for Distillery in an FA Cup tie against one of his former clubs Blackburn Park Road F.C. He missed the 1888–89 season due to suspension but despite this Distillery bought him out of the army in time for the 1889–90 season and Reynolds helped the club reach the final of the County Antrim Shield. In June 1890 he joined Ulster F.C., a now defunct Belfast team. In 1891 Reynolds helped this team finish runners-up to Linfield in both the Irish Cup and the very first Irish Football League.

=== West Bromwich Albion ===
In March 1891, Reynolds joined West Bromwich Albion (WBA) and it was subsequently discovered that he was actually English. During his debut 1891–92 season with WBA he played 17 games and scored 2 goals. He also won the first of his three FA Cup winners medals, scoring for WBA in the 1892 FA Cup final as they beat Aston Villa 3–0. During the 1892–93 season he played a further 20 games and scored one more goal for WBA. This was WBA's first ever penalty in a First Division game and it came against Nottingham Forest on 3 April 1893. During his time with WBA he also briefly played for Droitwich Town either as a guest or on loan. After falling out with the WBA management committee, Reynolds was sold to Aston Villa for a fee of £50.

=== Aston Villa ===
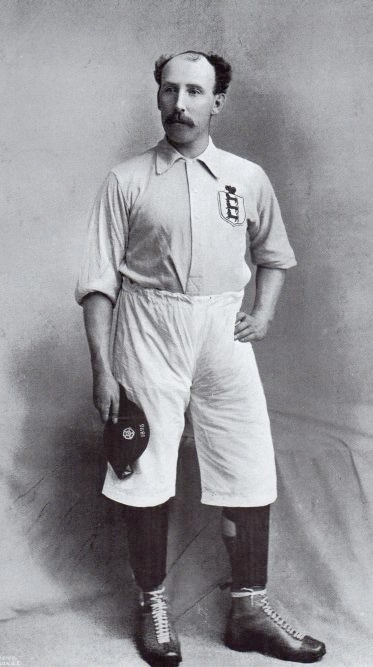
Reynolds in 1895

Between 1892 and 1897, Reynolds made 96 league appearances and scored 17 goals for Aston Villa. His time at Villa was the most successful period of his career and he was a prominent member of a very successful team, helping them win the English League in 1894, 1896 and 1897. Reynolds also played a further 14 times for Villa in the FA Cup and helped them win the competition in 1895 and 1897. The 1895 final saw him face his former club WBA.

=== Later career ===
After leaving Aston Villa, Reynolds turned out for Celtic, and then Southampton, during the 1897–98 season. Although both teams won their respective league titles Reynolds made little or no contribution and his career was in decline, albeit he did score once for Celtic in a 2–1 win over Hibernian. He subsequently played for a further five clubs on a semi-professional basis, including a spell as a player/coach in New Zealand. He eventually retired as a player in April 1905 and worked as a coach at Cardiff City during the 1907–08 season.

After retiring from football he settled in Sheffield where he worked as a collier until his death in 1917.

== International career ==
=== Ireland ===
Between 1890 and 1891, while playing for Distillery and Ulster F.C., Reynolds made five appearances for Ireland, four as a half-back and one as winger. He made his debut for Ireland on 8 February 1890 in a 5–2 defeat to Wales. Then on 15 March he played against England and scored Ireland's only goal in the 9–1 defeat. This was the only international in which he played as a winger. During the 1891 British Home Championship he played in all three of Ireland's games.

=== England ===
While playing for WBA and Aston Villa, Reynolds made eight appearances as a half-back for England. He made his England debut at the age of 23 in 1892 against Scotland. He scored for England in the 6–0 win over Wales in 1893 and the 2–2 draw with Scotland in 1894, but not in his only match against Ireland. He helped England win three British Home Championship titles. Reynolds made his last appearance for England against Scotland in 1897 at the age of 28. He also played for the Football League XI on four occasions.

Some sources credit him with a goal in a 5–2 victory against Scotland on 1 April 1893, but it is now accepted that this goal completed a hat-trick by Fred Spiksley.

== Style of play ==
Reynolds was a competitive player with ball skills and footwork. He was regarded as one of the greatest footballers of the 1890s and was one of the highest paid players of his generation.

== Personal life ==
Reynolds gained a reputation for drinking and womanising and as a result much of the money he earned disappeared. He fathered at least one illegitimate child and in 1899 he appeared in court for non-payment of child maintenance. His heavy drinking blighted his latter career and after brief spells at Celtic and then Southampton, he became a semi-professional journeyman.

Towards the end of his life he worked as a miner in Sheffield and he died alone in a boarding house at the age of 48. Reynolds and his career have been the subject of several lectures, including one entitled How to play football, win friends and die young: The life of John Reynolds, given by Dr. Neal Garnham at the University of Ulster.

== Honours ==
Distillery

- County Antrim Shield runners-up: 1889–90

Ulster

- Irish Football League runners-up: 1890–91
- Irish Cup runners-up: 1890–91

West Bromwich Albion

- FA Cup winners: 1892

Aston Villa

- FA Cup winners: 1895, 1897
- English Champions: 1893–94, 1895–96, 1896–97

England

- British Champions: 1892, 1893, 1895

== See also ==
- List of association footballers who have been capped for two senior national teams
