= Fred Spiksley =

English footballer and manager

Personal information
- Full name: Frederick Spiksley
- Date of birth: 25 January 1870
- Place of birth: Gainsborough, Lincolnshire, England
- Date of death: 28 July 1948 (aged 78)
- Place of death: Goodwood Racecourse, England
- Position: Outside left

Youth career
- 1883-c.1886: Holy Trinity School, Gainsborough
- c. 1884: Eclipse
- 1887: Gainsborough Jubilee Swifts

Senior career*
Years	Team	Apps	(Gls)
1886	Gainsborough Working Men's Club		
1886	Gainsborough Wednesday		
1887–1891	Gainsborough Trinity		
1891–1903	Wednesday	293	(100)
1904	Glossop North End	3	(1)
1905	Leeds City	7	(0)
1905–1906	Southern United	?	(?)
1906	Watford	11	(5)

International career
1893–1898	England	7	(7)

Managerial career
- 1910: IFK Norrköping
- 1911: AIK Stockholm
- 1911: Sweden
- 1911–1912: MTV Munich 1879
- 1912–1914: 1. FC Nürnberg
- 1922–1924: Reforma AC
- 1922–1924: Real Club España
- 1926–1927: 1. FC Nürnberg
- 1928: Lausanne Sports
- 1931: CF Badalona
- * Club domestic league appearances and goals

Frederick Spiksley (25 January 1870 – 28 July 1948) was an English footballer and coach, who played as a forward for Sheffield Wednesday and England. He also played for Gainsborough Trinity, Glossop North End, Leeds City, Watford. After retiring as a player in 1906, he worked as a coach and won national league titles in Sweden, Mexico and Germany. During the First World War he was arrested but escaped from a German Police prison.

== Early life and family ==
Spiksley was born in Gainsborough, the son of a boilermaker. His father Edward worked at the Britannia Ironworks in Gainsborough. Edward had been married to Frederick's mother Sarah for five years by the time he was born. Frederick had a younger sister named Florence Maud, who died on 18 December 1875, at the age of nearly five weeks.

At the time of the 1881 census, Spiksley's father was recorded as working as a Publican in Gainsborough. Frederick had an older brother named John Edward, and a younger brother named William.

== Playing career ==
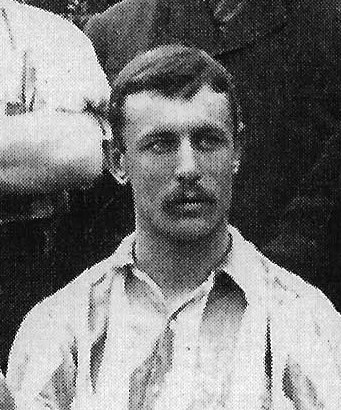
Spiksley in 1896 as part of The Wednesday's FA Cup team.

After playing for local teams in Gainsborough, including Gainsborough Trinity (for whom he had scored 131 goals in 126 appearances), he signed for Wednesday in 1891. His later career was marred by injury (including a serious knee injury in 1903) and he played for Leeds City, Southern United and Watford.

He was also an England international, scoring hat-tricks for his country on both his debut against Wales and second appearance against Scotland, both in 1893.

== Coaching career ==
After retiring as a player Spiskley joined the Fred Karno Company, and worked in a theatre with Charlie Chaplin. He then became a football coach who worked in Sweden, Germany, France, Switzerland, Belgium, Spain, the United States, Peru and Mexico, as well as in England.

After World War I broke out, he was coaching in Germany and was held in civilian orisoner of war camp along with his son. His wife managed to secure their release, and the family moved to Switzerland. He then returned to England but was deemed unfit to serve in the War due to his earlier knee injury, which Spiksley exacerbated by dislocating his knee at will to fool the medical examiner. He spent the war working in Sheffield as a munitions inspector, resuming his coaching career after the war ended.

He ended his career coaching at the King Edward VII School in Sheffield.

== Playing style ==
Spiksley was a "slight and silky winger" who was described as the "fastest man in football" by his England international team-mate Billy Bassett.

== Personal life ==
He was married to Ellen with a son, Fred Jr. He and Ellen later divorced in 1928 due to his adultery. Spiksley was also a gambler who suffered heavy losses and was made bankrupt in 1909. Spiksley married Rose Reichel, on 3 June 1929, at Paddington Register Office.

== Later life and death ==
He died from a heart attack at the age of 78 whilst attending Ladies' Day at Goodwood Racecourse in 1948.
