= William Winckworth =

English footballer

Personal information
- Full name: William Norman Winckworth
- Date of birth: 9 February 1870
- Place of birth: London, England
- Date of death: 9 November 1941 (aged 71)
- Place of death: Exeter, England
- Position: Right half

Senior career*
| Years | Team | Apps | (Gls) |
- Old Westminsters

International career
| 1892–1893 | England | 2 | (1) |
- * Club domestic league appearances and goals

William Norman Winckworth (9 February 1870 – 9 November 1941) was an English international footballer who played as a right half.

== Career ==
While playing for Old Westminsters, Winckworth earned two caps for the England national side between 1892 and 1893.
