= Rupert Sandilands =

English footballer (1868–1946

Personal information
- Full name: Rupert Renorden Sandilands
- Date of birth: 7 August 1868
- Place of birth: Denford, England
- Date of death: 20 April 1946 (aged 77)
- Place of death: Southampton, England
- Position: Outside left

Senior career*
Years	Team	Apps	(Gls)
1888–1898	Old Westminsters		
1889–1897	Corinthian		
1892	→ Casuals (guest)		
1896	→ Ealing (guest)		

International career
1892–1896	England	5	(3)
- * Club domestic league appearances and goals

Rupert Renorden Sandilands (7 August 1868 – 20 April 1946) was an English international footballer who played as an outside left.

== Early and personal life ==
Sandilands was born on 7 August 1868 at the vicarage in Denford, near Thrapston in Northamptonshire, where his father Percival was the vicar. He was the youngest of six children. By 1881 the family was living at Lyvdene School in Devon, where his father was schoolmaster.

Sandilands attended Westminster School. He worked in London as a clerk for the Bank of England. In addition to his football career, he also played hockey and cricket.

== Football career ==
Sandilands played football whilst attending Westminster School, and played club football for Old Westminsters, Casuals, Corinthian and Ealing.

He earned five caps for the England national side between 1892 and 1896, scoring three goals. His first appearance for England was against Wales in March 1892; he scored England's second goal in a 2–0 victory. He had previously played for an England XI against Canada in a match not regarded as an official international.

== Later life and death ==
Sandilands had retired from the Bank of England by 1939. He was living in Lewes and died in Southampton on 20 April 1946, aged 77.
