= Arthur Henfrey (footballer) =

English footballer and cricketer

Arthur George Henfrey (19 December 1867 – 17 October 1929) was an English footballer who made five appearances for England between 1891 and 1896 playing initially as a forward and later as a half back. He also played cricket for Cambridge University and Northamptonshire.

== Football career ==
Henfrey was born in Finedon, Northamptonshire, and was educated at the nearby Wellingborough School, before going up to Jesus College, Cambridge, where he won a "Blue" for Cambridge University at football in 1890 and 1891.

He made his England debut as part of a mainly Midlands-based professional team that played Ireland at Molineux, Wolverhampton on 7 March 1891. Henfrey played as an inside forward, scoring once as England were comfortable 6–1 victors. This was Tinsley Lindley's final England appearance, which he marked by scoring twice.

After leaving university, he played for the Corinthians club. In his next England appearance, against Wales on 5 March 1892, he again played up front in a mainly amateur team, scoring the first goal as England ran out 2–0 winners. His goal was England's 150th goal in international matches.

He was not selected again for England until 18 March 1895, when he was recalled, now playing as a half-back, for the match against Wales played at Queen's Club, West Kensington. The entire England team were amateurs, and all had some connection with the Corinthians. The "expected England victory did not materialise" as they were held to a 1–1 draw, with G.O. Smith scoring for England.

His next England appearance came a year later on 16 March 1896 as England convincingly defeated Wales 9–1 with Steve Bloomer scoring five goals. His final England appearance came three weeks later on 4 April 1896 against Scotland; the match ended in a 2–1 victory for the Scots, thus ending a run of twenty games unbeaten.

In his international career, Henfrey made a total of five appearances, scoring twice. Three of his matches ended in victories, with one draw and one defeat.

== Cricket career ==
Henfrey also played cricket for Cambridge University and made one first-class appearance for the university against A J Webbe's XI in May 1890. He scored a total of 17 runs in the match which, despite the name of the opposition, was a 12-a-side first-class game and was won by the visitors by 11 wickets.

He also played for Northamptonshire from 1886 to 1899 (before they had been promoted to "first-class" status), and was captain in 1893 and 1894.

== Later life ==
A short obituary in The Times records that he was later a Conservative councillor on Northamptonshire County Council.
