= R. Cunliffe Gosling =

English footballer

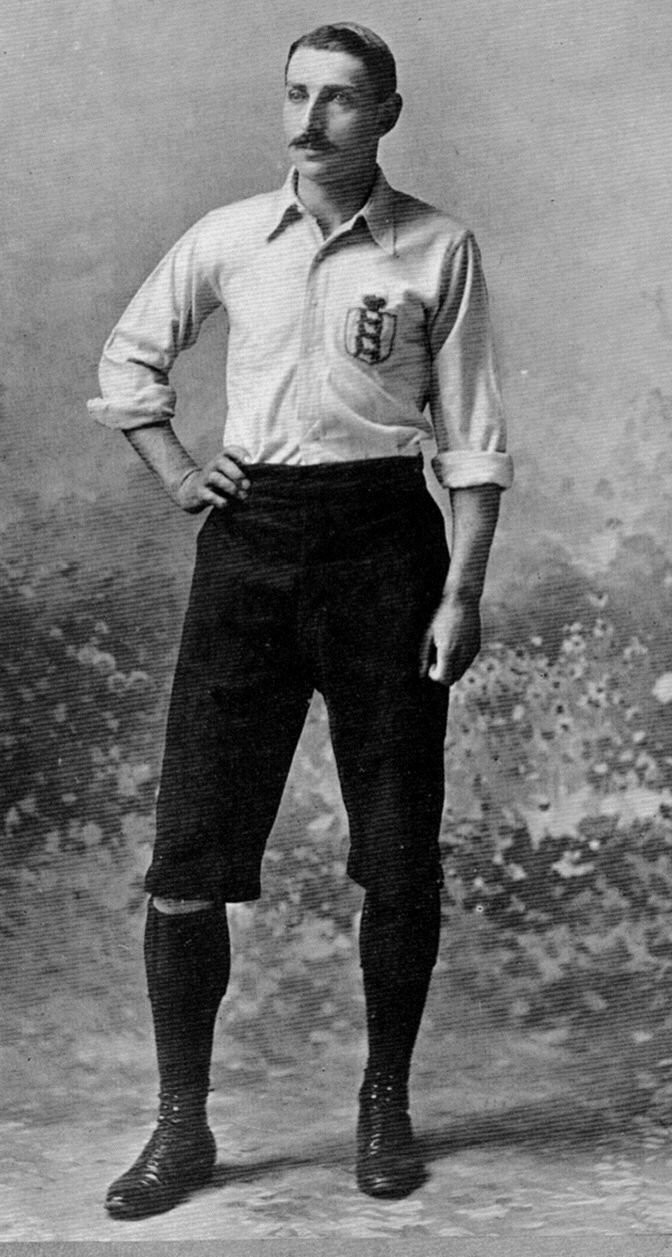
England captain Cunliffe Gosling.

Robert Cunliffe Gosling DL (15 June 1868 – 8 April 1922), was a Victorian-era footballer who played as a speedy inside forward for the renowned amateur clubs Old Etonians and the Corinthians. He captained the England team on one, possibly two, occasions (contemporary sources are inexact) and scored two goals.

Described by Sir Frederick Wall, the long-serving Secretary of the Football Association, as "the richest man who ever played football for England", Gosling was the scion of a wealthy Essex family and was educated at Eton and Trinity College, Cambridge. The oldest of seven brothers (and one of 14 children), four of whom played cricket for Eton against Harrow, he was, recalled the early sportswriter JAH Catton ("Tityrus"), "the most aristocratic-looking man I ever saw", a view concurred in by his England international colleague C.B. Fry, who described him as "the best-looking man of my acquaintance" and one of the players whose presence in the Corinthians' side contributed to "their reputation up North as a team of toffs".

Gosling's bearing lent him an imposing presence on the football field. He looked, Wall recalled, "every inch the high-born... [his] carriage and gait would have done credit to a court Chamberlain at a levee", and was admirably built, being merely "bone and muscle, not soft flesh". His play, the F.A. man added,

"was superb – all polish and perfection. He looked the gentleman he was, suave, kindly and never unfair. But let anybody tackle him and try to nudge him off the ball! After impact with his massive proportions, with the impetus of a fleet runner, the tackler knew what a charge meant. He would be inclined to shake himself like a dog, with the air of assuring himself that all his limbs were still attached and functioning."

Edward Grayson, the historian of the early amateur game, was another admirer of the England captain. "Well over six feet in height," he wrote,

"and weighing nearly thirteen stone, he left his mark both at inside-right and inside-left, with his speed, passing and shooting from all angles that underlined the dribbling skill he had acquired from Eton's Field Game. His unselfishness and finesse no doubt gave him the wonderful knack of knowing how to keep his line together, a quality which England's selectors have unhappily found wanting in nearly all the inside-forwards with whom they have experimented since the Second World War. Gosling's play... was the very refinement of football, and effective football, too. Had any other club than Old Etonians claimed his service... he would have been exalted at football in the manner reserved by cricket idolaters for Lionel Palairet, Reggie Spooner and Victor Trumper."

Gosling was, moreover, invariably sportsmanlike in his approach to the game, and entirely lacked malice. It was this quality that led "Nudger" Needham, the Sheffield United and England professional, to describe him as "a heavy, but a gentle player".

Having played football for Cambridge against Oxford in the Varsity Match of 1890, Gosling was awarded a total of five England caps between 1892 and 1895, and showed himself – according to his contemporary G.O. Smith – one of the outstanding international forwards of the day: comparable to Steve Bloomer.

Gosling also played first-class cricket for Cambridge and Essex between 1888 and 1896.

After his retirement from sport, Cunliffe Gosling served as a Justice of the Peace in his home county, Essex, and in 1902 was appointed as High Sheriff of Essex and a deputy lieutenant of the county. He died in his bed, recorded Catton, at his home in Hassobury, Essex, aged 53, leaving a fortune proved at over £700,000 (£21,260,000 at current prices).

Sporting positions
Preceded by Charles Wreford-Brown	England football captain 1895	Succeeded by G.O. Smith
Honorary titles
Preceded by Ernest James Wythes	High Sheriff of Essex; 1902–1903	Succeeded by Richard Percival Davis
