= Corinthian F.C. =

English amateur football club

Corinthian
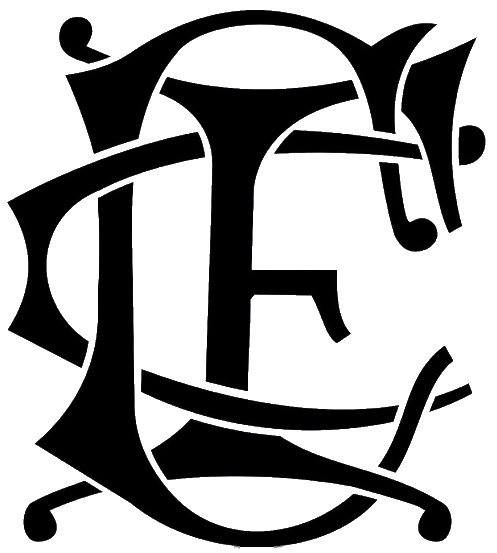
- Full name: Corinthian Football Club
- Founded: 1882
- Dissolved: 1939; 87 years ago (merged with Casuals F.C. to form Corinthian-Casuals F.C.)
- Ground: Queen's Club; Crystal Palace; The Oval
- League: (None)
Home colours

Corinthian Football Club was an English amateur football club based in London between 1882 and 1939. Above all, the club is credited with having popularised football around the world, having promoted sportsmanship and fair play, and having championed the ideals of amateurism.

The club was famed for its ethos of "sportsmanship, fair play, [and] playing for the love of the game". Corinthian Spirit, still understood as the highest standard of sportsmanship, is often associated with the side. This spirit was famously summed up in their attitude to penalties; "As far as they were concerned, a gentleman would never commit a deliberate foul on an opponent. So, if a penalty was awarded against the Corinthians, their goalkeeper would stand aside, lean languidly on the goalpost and watch the ball being kicked into his own net. If the Corinthians themselves won a penalty, their captain took a short run-up and gave the ball a jolly good whack, chipping it over the crossbar." Among others, Real Madrid were inspired to adopt Corinthian's white strip, while Sport Club Corinthians Paulista in Brazil and Zejtun Corinthians in Malta adopted their name.

In 1939, the Corinthians merged with Casuals F.C. to form a new club, Corinthian-Casuals F.C.

== History ==
Within twenty years the Corinthians were to become the greatest and most attractive team that football had then known. With an intelligent nonchalance and in their tailored shirts and well-cut shorts they brought a quality and culture to the game.

The club was founded on 28 September 1882 by Nicholas Lane Jackson, Assistant Secretary of the Football Association. At that time, football was still amateur, with the English game dominated by southern clubs. In international football (which had not yet spread beyond the home nations), Scotland prevailed, having won three consecutive matches over England by scores of 5–1, 6–1 and 5–4.

Jackson attributed Scotland's success to "the greater opportunities our opponents over the border [have] of playing together", and aimed to counteract this by forming a club "composed of the best amateur players in the kingdom". In order to accomplish this aim, Corinthian took care to avoid playing matches on Saturdays (when players might be playing for other clubs). The first proposed name for the club was the "Wednesday Club", but this was changed to the "Corinthian Football Club" on the suggestion of Harry Swepstone.

From the outset, Corinthian supplied large numbers of players to the England football team. During the 1880s, the majority of England caps were awarded to Corinthian players and, for two England matches against Wales in 1894 and 1895, the entire team consisted of members of the club (a feat achieved by no other club, before or since).

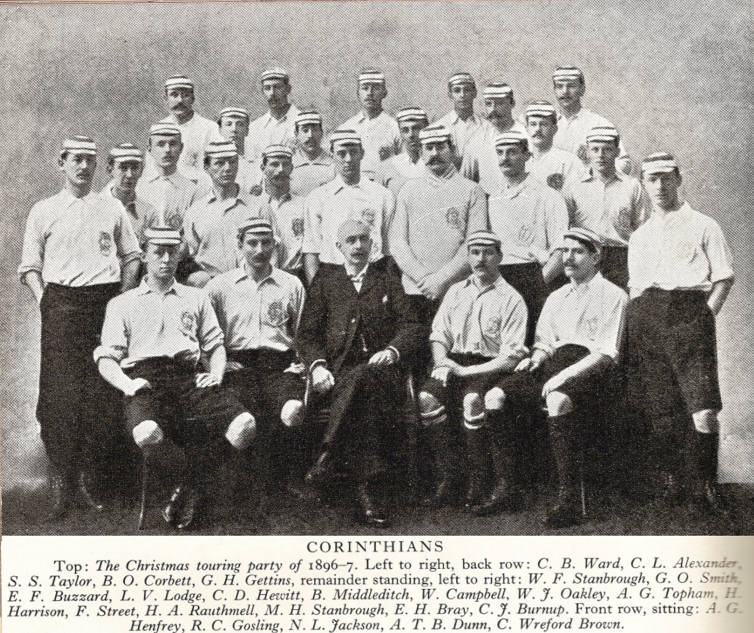
The Corinthian team of 1896–97

Given that the club's constitution declared that it should "not compete for any challenge cup or any prize of any description" the team originally only played friendly matches. An exception was later made for the Sheriff of London Charity Shield, for which they competed nine times between 1898 and 1907 (winning three), before the match was replaced in the calendar by the FA Charity Shield.

The club would have been strong contenders for the era's honours had they entered major competitions — shortly after Blackburn Rovers beat Queen's Park in the 1884 FA Cup Final, the Corinthians beat Blackburn 8–1. In 1889, it was written that Corinthians was the only amateur club "which might be pitted against [inaugural Football League champions Preston North End] with any reasonable hope of success". In the 1904 Sheriff of London Charity Shield against Bury (who had beaten Derby County 6–0 in the 1903 FA Cup final), Corinthian won 10–3.

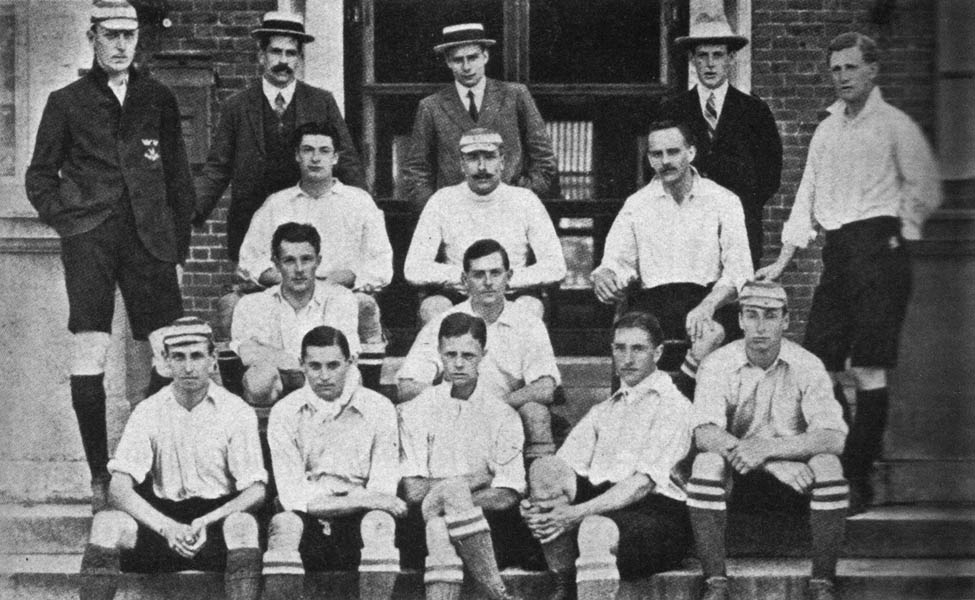
The Corinthian team that toured North America in 1906

Corinthian began competing in the FA Cup from the 1922–23 season. They also competed in the 1927 FA Charity Shield against FA Cup winners Cardiff City, losing 2–1 at Stamford Bridge.

The club played at various venues including the Queen's Club, The Oval, and the old Crystal Palace. On 12 April 1939, the Corinthians played their last match. They merged with Casuals F.C. to form a new club, Corinthian-Casuals F.C.

== Honorary distinctions ==
Among many others:

- Inspired five Brazilian São Paulo railway workers to found one of Brazil's largest and most successful professional teams, Sport Club Corinthians Paulista.
- Fielded the first Black player to play Association Football at international level, Andrew Watson
- Inflicted English side Manchester United's heaviest defeat, beating the Red Devils 11–3 in a friendly in Leyton, London in 1904.
- Awarded Sweden their first National Football title, named the Corinthian Bowl.
- Inspired Percy Ashley to name Manchester Corinthians LFC in 1949.

== Notable players ==
Notable players who have played for Corinthian include:

- Andrew Watson: the first Black player to play Association football at international level with the Scotland National Team.
- Dr John Smith: Scottish international who also played rugby for the first 'unofficial' British Lions tour to Australia and New Zealand
- C. B. Fry: sporting polymath who made 74 appearances for Corinthian, described by contemporaries as "...probably the most variously gifted Englishman of any age"
- R. C. Gosling: described by Sir Frederick Wall, the long-serving Secretary of the Football Association, as "the richest man who ever played football for England".
- Charles Aubrey Smith: a former Corinthian footballer and British actor, who has a star on the Hollywood Walk of Fame, situated at 6327 Hollywood Blvd.
- Max Woosnam: the English sportsman referred to as the 'Greatest British sportsman' in recognition of his achievements.
- Graham Doggart: a leading goal scorer of Corinthian, who went on to appoint England's World Cup winning manager, Sir Alf Ramsey.
- Charles Bambridge: held the record for the most years as England's top goalscorer; only Michael Owen, Vivian Woodward, Wayne Rooney, Gary Lineker, Jimmy Greaves and Harry Kane have more.
- Tinsley Lindley: A Corinthian centre-forward who famously wore his brogues instead of football boots.
- Charles Wreford-Brown: A constant figure throughout the club's golden era, he played 161 games for the club, scoring 8 goals.

== Tours ==
The club's foreign tours are also credited with having popularised football around the world; they were the first club to take the sport outside Europe; the 2000 and 2012 FIFA Club World Champions, SC Corinthians Paulista, are named after the club (indeed, Charles Miller, considered the father of football in Brazil, played for the club in 1892), and the 1960, 1998, 2002, 2014, 2016, 2017, 2018, 2022, 2024 FIFA Club World Champions, Real Madrid, wear white to this day in their honor.

Their tours included South Africa, Canada, the United States, Hungary, Czechoslovakia, Spain, Denmark, Holland, Austria, Sweden, Switzerland, Brazil, Ireland, Jamaica and Germany.

During 'The Split', the 1907–1914 dispute about professional clubs being admitted to membership of the country Football Associations, Corinthian pledged its allegiance to the Amateur Football Alliance, as did Oxford University and Cambridge University. Corinthian therefore, banned from playing top home opposition by The FA, increased the frequency of their foreign tours; "Corinthian F.C. had little option but to concentrate on their [footballing] missionary work overseas and of the 131 matches played before 'The Split' was resolved in January 1914, 72 were played abroad".

The club played at various venues including the Queen's Club, The Oval, and the old Crystal Palace. On 12 April 1939, the Corinthians played their last match. They merged with Casuals F.C. to form a new club, Corinthian-Casuals F.C.

== Honours ==
- Sheriff of London Charity Shield
  - Winners (3): 1898 (shared), 1900, 1904

== England international players ==
In all, Corinthian had 86 England Internationals (the most of any club), 16 England captains (the most of any club), 12 Welsh Internationals, 8 Scottish Internationals and 2 Irish Internationals.

Many players played for Corinthian as a secondary club while playing for another primary club. The 17 players listed below are those that had Corinthian as their principal club:

- Claude Ashton (1 cap)
- Alfred Bower (5 caps)
- Jackie Burns (16 caps)
- Bertie Corbett (1 cap)
- Norman Creek (1 cap)
- Graham Doggart (1 cap)
- Tip Foster (4 caps)
- C. B. Fry (1 cap)
- Jackie Hegan (4 caps)
- Arthur Henfrey (4 caps)
- Cecil Holden-White (2 caps)
- Anthony Hossack (2 caps)
- Vaughan Lodge (2 caps)
- Bernard Middleditch (1 cap)
- William Oakley (12 caps)
- Basil Patchitt (2 caps)
- G. O. Smith (7 caps)
- Geoffrey Plumpton Wilson (2 caps)

Danish international Nils Middelboe played for Corinthian after finishing his career with Chelsea.

== See also ==
- Scotch Professors
