= List of Wales international footballers born outside Wales =

This is a list of footballers who played for Wales' national football team who were born outside of Wales. For the purposes of international football the football world governing body, FIFA, considers Scotland, England, Wales and Northern Ireland to be distinct and individual countries.

The following players were not born in Wales and have played at least one game for the senior Wales national football team. Players are listed by birthplace.

== Belgium ==
- Pat Van Den Hauwe

== Canada ==
- Leo Newton

== Cyprus ==
- Jeremy Goss

== England ==
- Harry Adams
- Ethan Ampadu
- Smart Arridge
- William Bell
- Ernie Bowdler
- Jack Bowdler
- Mark Bradley
- Tom Bradshaw
- Thomas Britten
- David Brooks
- Jason Brown
- Thomas Bryan
- Marcus Browning
- Thomas Burnett
- James Chester
- Simon Church
- Danny Collins
- Jack Collison
- John Cornforth
- Andrew Crofts
- Knyvett Crosse
- Mark Crossley
- Karl Darlow
- Alan Davies
- Albert Davies
- Craig Davies
- John Davies
- Jay Dasilva
- Simon Davies
- Thomas Davies
- William Davies
- Andy Dorman
- Jack Doughty
- Roger Doughty
- Paul Dummett
- Freddy Eastwood
- David Edwards
- John Hawley Edwards
- Jim Edwards
- Robert Edwards
- Rob Edwards
- Ian Evans
- John Evans
- Paul Evans
- Robert Evans
- George Farmer
- Carl Fletcher
- Kieron Freeman
- Sam Gillam
- George Glascodine
- Richard Gough
- Gareth Hall
- Jack Hallam
- Dennis Heywood
- George Higham
- Mick Hill
- Trevor Hockey
- Glyn Hodges
- Frederick Hughes
- Alexander Hunter
- Lloyd Isgrove
- Kenny Jackett
- Daniel James
- Jordan James
- Andy Johnson
- Brennan Johnson
- David Jones
- Di Jones
- Richard Jones
- Ryan Jones
- Vinnie Jones
- Fred Kelly
- Andy King
- Alan Knill
- Lewis Koumas
- James Lawrence
- Benjamin Lewis
- Albert Lockley
- Robert McMillan
- Gavin Maguire
- Paul Mardon
- Rabbi Matondo
- Steve Morison
- Andy Marriott
- Chris Mepham
- Kieffer Moore
- Joe Morrell
- Charlie Morris
- Edward Morris
- James Morris
- John Morris
- Robert Morris
- Daniel Nardiello
- Lewin Nyatanga
- John Oster
- Digby Owen
- Thomas Owen
- Maurice Parry
- Tom Parry
- David Partridge
- Edward Phennah
- John Phillips
- Lewis Price
- Paul Price
- Sam Ricketts
- John Roach
- Dave Roberts
- Tyler Roberts
- Hal Robson-Kanu
- Henry Sabine
- Charlie Savage
- Edward Shaw
- William Shone
- Matthew Smith
- Brian Stock
- Kit Symons
- Gareth Taylor
- Ben Thatcher
- George Thomas
- Sorba Thomas
- David Thomson
- George Thomson
- Alfred Townsend
- Paul Trollope
- Will Vaulks
- Sam Vokes
- Darren Ward
- Rhys Weston
- Ady Williams
- Andy Williams
- Ashley Williams
- George C Williams
- George H Williams
- Jonny Williams
- Joseph Williams
- Ben Woodburn

== Germany ==
- Darren Barnard
- George Berry
- Adam Davies
- Alan Neilson
- David Phillips

== Ireland ==
- William Harrison

== Saudi Arabia ==
- Rhys Norrington-Davies

== Scotland ==
- Daniel Grey
- Alexander Jones

== Singapore ==
- Eric Young

== Spain ==
- Josh Farrell

== United States ==
- Adam Henley
- Boaz Myhill

== Zambia ==
- Robert Earnshaw

== Zimbabwe ==
- John Robinson
