= Oswestry F.C. (1875) =

Former association football club

- Full name: Oswestry Football Club
- Nickname: the Oswestrians
- Founded: 1875
- Dissolved: 1891
- Ground: Cricket Ground
- Secretary: J. N. Whittaker
Home colours

Oswestry Football Club, occasionally known as Oswestry Town, was a football club from Shropshire.

== History ==
The club was founded out of Oswestry Cricket Club on 4 September 1875; it claimed a foundation date of 1870 which may have been the date of the cricket club's foundation. Oswestry reached the semi-final of the first Shropshire Senior Cup in 1877–78, and were drawn to visit the original Shrewsbury club. The original tie ended in a 2–2 draw, with Oswestry's forward Alexander Fletcher Jones - a former student at Oswestry School but by now a mathematics master at Clifton College - being picked out as "an admirable centre". but the week before the replay, Jones was killed in an extraordinary incident while accompanying the College's cadet corps on the Avonmouth Railway; one of the pupils, Edward Hemming, accidentally discharged a gun in one carriage, and the bullet struck Jones - in another carriage - in the chest. Oswestry went down 3–0 in the replay (also at Shrewsbury), its players wearing black armbands.

The club gained a boost in 1878, when Druids temporarily folded, which resulted in so many Druids players joining Oswestry, that Oswestry provided the majority of the Welsh national side which narrowly lost 2–1 at England in January 1879. The club resigned from the Birmingham & District Football Association in September 1880.

It entered the FA Cup for the first time in 1882–83, borrowing several players from the rival Oswestry White Star club for the first round tie with the revived Druids, although to no avail as the Shropshire side bowed out.

By the 1883–84 season, Oswestry F.C. absorbed the White Star, briefly using the White Star name for the Oswestry second XI. The club promptly went on its best run in that season's FA Cup, when it reached the third round (last 28), and had the honour of hosting Queen's Park, the highlight of the game for the home support being W. T. Foulkes equalizing an early Spiders goal, but the superior Scottish side ran out 7–1 winners, and Oswestry held a public dinner in honour of its conqueror at the Wynnstay Arms that evening.

Its appearance in the 1885–86 FA Cup was not so convivial, its second round tie at home to Crewe Alexandra kicking off late because of a dispute between Oswestry players and committee, which led to a number of players going on strike, and an XI only being rounded up late. The game ended 1–1, but because of the kick-off delay, and a 15 minute hold-up while Oswestry's Foulkes and Alexandra's Conde indulged in a lengthy punch-up, the referee declared it too dark to play extra-time, and the Football Association disqualified Oswestry, due to the club's late arrival.

Oswestry entered the Welsh Cup from its first edition in 1877–78 until 1891–92. Its greatest achievement came in 1883–84, when it became the first English club to win the competition, beating Druids 1–0 in a replay at Wrexham, the goal due to "the joint efforts of Farmer and Shaw", after an initial 0–0 draw. The two sides met again in the 1884–85 Welsh Cup final, but Druids gained revenge with a 3–1 win, thanks to two extra-time goals, after both original match and replay had ended 1–1 after 90 minutes.

For the club's final Welsh Cup entry, it was drawn to visit Chirk AAA, but scratched, and never appeared again. It was succeeded by Oswestry United.

== Colours ==
The club wore blue.

== Ground ==
The club played at the Oswestry Cricket Ground.

== Notable players ==
A number of Oswestrians were capped for Wales; those who played against England in 1879 included Llewelyn Kenrick, George Higham, Thomas Owen, Watkin William Shone, Dennis Heywood, William Davies, and William Digby Owen. Davies scored the Welsh goal, which was also Wales' first international goal.

Seth Powell, part of the 1884 Cup-winning side, went on to play in the Football League for West Bromwich Albion.

George Farmer and R. T. Gough were two of the White Star players who came over to Oswestry and were part of the 1884 Cup-winning side, Farmer being co-responsible for the winning goal. Edward Shaw, who shared the credit for the winning goal, was also a Welsh international.
