= Edward Morris =

Edward or Ed Morris may refer to:

- Edward Morris (businessman) (1866–1913), president of Morris & Company
- Edward Morris (cricketer) (1849–1928), English cricketer
- Edward Morris (historian) (1940–2016), British art historian
- Edward Morris (footballer) (1872–?), Welsh footballer
- Edward Morris, 1st Baron Morris (1859–1935), lawyer and Prime Minister of Newfoundland
- Edward Craig Morris (1939–2006), American archaeologist
- Edward Ellis Morris (1843–1902), educationist and writer in Australia
- Edward James Morris (1915–1999), Royal Air Force officer
- Edward Joy Morris (1815–1881), U.S. Representative from Pennsylvania
- Edward Lyman Morris (1870–1913), American botanist
- Edward Parmelee Morris (1853–1938), American classicist
- Edward Morris (basketball) (born 1984), American basketball player
- Edward H. Morris (1858–1943), American lawyer
- Edward Morris (bowls) (born 1988), English lawn bowler
- Ed Morris (1880s pitcher) (1862–1937), Major League Baseball pitcher
- Ed Morris (1920s pitcher) (1899–1932), Major League Baseball pitcher
- Edward Morris (politician) (1813–1887), President of the Legislative Council of Newfoundland
- Eddie Morris (rapper), rapper and break dancer, member of Grandmaster Flash and the Furious Five
- Eddie Morris (announcer), American politician from Massachusetts Senate, also the stadium announcer for Harvard Crimson football games

== See also ==
- Morris (surname)
