= John Morgan (footballer, born 1876) =

Welsh footballer

Personal information
- Full name: John Tracey Morgan
- Date of birth: 24 August 1876
- Place of birth: Llandysilio, Wales

Senior career*
| Years | Team | Apps | (Gls) |
- St Martins
| 1898–1900 | Chirk | | |
| 1900–1902 | Oswestry February | | |
| 1902–1904 | Druids | | |
| 1904–1906 | Wrexham | | |
| 1907–1908 | Chirk | | |
| 1910–1911 | Chester | | |

International career
| 1905 | Wales | 1 | (0) |
- * Club domestic league appearances and goals

John Tracey Morgan (born 24 August 1876) was a Welsh international footballer. A goalkeeper, he spent two years as a reserve with Chirk before playing for Oswestry, Druids, Wrexham and Chester. During his career, he won the Welsh Cup three times and won a single cap for Wales in 1905.

== Early life ==
Morgan, was born in Llandysilio, Wales, and was raised by his older brother. The pair lived in the home of the Morris family, whose three sons also Charlie, John and Robert all played international football for Wales.

== Career ==
Morgan began his career playing for local amateur side St Martins where he initially played as a forward. When the team's regular goalkeeper failed to arrive for a match, Morgan stepped in and took up the position permanently. He joined Chirk in 1898 where he spent two seasons as understudy to John Morris before moving to Oswestry February in 1900 to play first team football. His performances for Oswestry resulted in a move to Druids, which had suffered defeat to Morgan's Oswestry in the 1901 Welsh Cup final, where he quickly excelled, saving 12 penalties in his first season. In 1904 he won his second Welsh Cup, this time with Druids, defeating Aberdare Athletic.

In 1904, Morgan joined Wrexham, where he on the Welsh Cup for a third time in 1905. He also won his first and only international cap for Wales the same year, playing against Ireland. However, he suffered a broken wrist in 1906 that nearly led to his retirement. He was thrown out of the Shropshire Football Association when it discovered he was playing as a professional. He subsequently adopted his uncle's surname Morgan and played a single season with his former club Chirk who hid his identity. He finished his career with Chester.

== Later life ==
Morgan later worked as a coal miner in North Wales before moving to China.
