= Henry Sabine =

Welsh footballer

Personal information
- Date of birth: 9 January 1865
- Place of birth: Oswestry, England
- Date of death: 13 August 1955
- Place of death: Harrogate, England

International career
| Years | Team | Apps | (Gls) |
| 1887 | Wales | 1 | (1) |

Henry Wilmshurst Sabine (9 January 1865 – 13 August 1955) was a Welsh international footballer.

Sabine was born at Oswestry, Shropshire, in January 1865 and educated at Oswestry School.

He played football with Oswestry. He was part of the Wales national football team, playing 1 match and scoring 1 goal on 12 March 1887 against Ireland at the 1886–87 British Home Championship.

Sabine also played cricket at club level for Oswestry and, between 1893 and 1895, at county level for Shropshire.

He died in August 1955 aged 90 at Harrogate, Yorkshire.

== See also ==
- List of Wales international footballers (alphabetical)
- List of Wales international footballers born outside Wales
