= 1908–09 FC Barcelona season =

10th season in existence of FC Barcelona

FC Barcelona
1908–09 season
- President: Vicenç Reig; Joan Gamper
- Campionat de Catalunya: First
- Campeonato de España: Semifinal
Home colours	Away colours

The 1908–09 season was the tenth season for FC Barcelona.

== Squad ==
Note: Flags indicate national team as defined under FIFA eligibility rules; some limited exceptions apply. Players may hold more than one non-FIFA nationality.

No.	Pos.	Nation	Player
—	GK	(Spain) ESP	Romá Solà
—	GK	(Germany) GER	Udo Steinberg
—	DF	(Spain) ESP	Francisco Bru
—	DF	(England) ENG	James Morris
—	DF	(Spain) ESP	Francesc Sanz
—	DF	(Spain) ESP	Albert Almasqué
—	MF	(Spain) ESP	Josep Quirante
—	MF	(Spain) ESP	Romà Forns
—	MF	(Spain) ESP	Joan Grau
—	DF	(Switzerland) SUI	Ernst-Alfred Thalmann

No.	Pos.	Nation	Player
—	MF	(Germany) GER	Julius Müller
—	MF	(France) FRA	Enrique Normand Faurie
—	FW	(Spain) ESP	Enric Peris
—	FW	(England) ENG	Charles Wallace
—	FW	(Scotland) SCO	William White
—	FW	(Spain) ESP	Miquel Puig
—	FW	(Spain) ESP	Arsenio Comamala
—	FW	(Switzerland) SUI	E. Büchlein
—	FW	(Spain) ESP	Carles Comamala

== Results ==
Friendly

1 October 1908	FC Espanya	0 – 0	FC Barcelona	Barcelona
				Stadium: Espanya

11 October 1908	FC Barcelona	3 – 2	FC Espanya	Barcelona
	Steinberg; Wallace			Stadium: Muntaner; Referee: Marial

3 January 1909	FC Barcelona	0 – 3	Stade Helvetique Marsella	Barcelona
				Stadium: Muntaner; Attendance: 4000; Referee: Morris

6 May 1909	FC Espanya	0 – 6	FC Barcelona	Barcelona
			C.Comamala; Quirante; С.Wallace	Stadium: Espanya; Referee: Dagollada

14 May 1909	AC Galeno	2 – 2	FC Barcelona	Barcelona

30 May 1909	FC Barcelona	3 – 0	Stade Toulosin	Barcelona
	C.Comamala			Stadium: Industria; Referee: Morris

31 May 1909	FC Barcelona	1 – 1	Stade Toulosin	Barcelona
	Quirante			Stadium: Industria; Referee: Morris

7 April 1909 consolación Campeonato de España	FC Barcelona	2 – 1	Athletic Club	Madrid
	Wallace; C. Comamala		Goal	Stadium: Campo de O'Donell; Referee: Berraondo

Torneig Catala De Futbol

23 May 1909	FC Barcelona	1 – 0^{1}	Català FC	Barcelona
	C.Comamala			Stadium: Universitari; Referee: Lioret

23 May 1909	FC Barcelona	2 – 0	Reial Club Deportiu Espanyol de Barcelona	Barcelona
	Forns; C.Comamala			Stadium: Universitari; Referee: Cabot

23 May 1909 Final	Universitari	0 – 2	FC Barcelona	Barcelona
			C.Comamala	Stadium: Universitari; Referee: Lloret

Copa Sabadell

6 December 1908	Sabadell	0 – 5	FC Barcelona	Barcelona
			White; Steinberg; Wallace	Stadium: Sabadell; Referee: Berdie

Concurs RCD Espanyol

6 June 1909	FC Barcelona	5 – 0	Central	Barcelona
	Quirante; C.Comamala			Stadium: Espanyol; Referee: Vinas

13 June 1909	FC Barcelona	4 – 1	Català FC	Barcelona
	C.Comamala; Forns			Stadium: Espanyol; Referee: Matarrodona

20 June 1909 Final	Reial Club Deportiu Espanyol de Barcelona	1 – 1^{2}	FC Barcelona	Barcelona
			Withe	Stadium: Espanyol; Referee: Balat

Exposició de València

27 June 1909	FC Barcelona	3 – 2	Reial Club Deportiu Espanyol de Barcelona	València
	C.Comamala; Buchlein			Referee: Reberg

29^{3} and 30^{3} June 1909	FC Barcelona	2 – 1	Sociedad Gimnástica Española	València
	C.Comamala; Buchlein			Referee: Marti

1 July 1909 Final	València CF	0 – 4	FC Barcelona	València
			C.Comamala; Forns	Referee: Sanz

Campionat de Catalunya

24 January 1909 Jornada 2	X SC	0 – 1	FC Barcelona	Barcelona
			Forns	Stadium: Camp del carrer Marina; Referee: Degollada

31 January 1909 Jornada 3	Català SC	1 – 1	FC Barcelona	Barcelona
	Casellas		Bru	Stadium: Velòdrom de la Bonanova; Referee: Castillo

7 February 1909 Jornada 4	FC Espanya	2 – 2	FC Barcelona	Barcelona
	Goal		Quirante; Wallace	Stadium: Camp del carrer Entença; Referee: Reñé

14 February 1909 Jornada 5	AC Galeno	1 – 3	FC Barcelona	Barcelona
	Goal		Forns; Wallace; Peris	Stadium: Camp del carrer Entença; Referee: Vinyes

7 March 1909 Jornada 7	FC Barcelona	3 – 1	CD Español	Barcelona
	Romà Forns; Peris; Wallace		Grau	Stadium: Camp de l'Hospital Clínic; Referee: Degollada

14 March 1909 Jornada 8	FC Barcelona	2 – 2	Català SC	Barcelona
	Forns; Wallace		Casellas	Stadium: Camp del carrer Indústria; Attendance: 2.000; Referee: Ponz Junyent

21 March 1909 Jornada 9	FC Barcelona	Unknown	FC Espanya	Barcelona
				Stadium: Camp del carrer Indústria

28 March 1909 Jornada 10	FC Barcelona	4 – 0	AC Galeno	Barcelona
	Wallace; White; Quirante			Stadium: Camp del carrer Indústria; Referee: Flaquer

Campeonato de España

5 April 1909 Semifinals	Club Español de Madrid	3 – 2	FC Barcelona	Madrid
	Neyra		Forns; Wallace	Stadium: Campo de O'Donell; Attendance: 8.000; Referee: Montojo
