= Alfred Townsend =

Welsh footballer

Personal information
- Date of birth: 1864
- Place of birth: England

International career
Years	Team	Apps	(Gls)
1887–1893	Wales	2	(0)

Alfred Townsend (born 1864) was a Welsh international footballer. He was part of the Wales national football team between 1887 and 1893, playing 2 matches. He played his first match on 12 March 1887 against Ireland and his last match on 5 April 1893 against Ireland.

== See also ==
- List of Wales international footballers (alphabetical)
- List of Wales international footballers born outside Wales
