= Joseph Williams (footballer) =

Welsh footballer

Personal information
- Date of birth: 13 September 1857
- Place of birth: England

International career
Years	Team	Apps	(Gls)
1884	Wales	1	(0)

Joseph Williams (born 13 September 1857) was a Welsh international footballer. He was part of the Wales national football team, playing 1 match on 17 March 1884 against England.

== See also ==
- List of Wales international footballers (alphabetical)
- List of Wales international footballers born outside Wales
