= John Roach (footballer, born 1862) =

Welsh footballer

Personal information
- Date of birth: 1862
- Place of birth: England

International career
| Years | Team | Apps | (Gls) |
| 1885 | Wales | 1 | (2) |

John Roach (born 1862) was a Welsh international footballer. He scored twice on his only appearance for the Wales national team, against Ireland on 11 April 1885 in the 1884–85 British Home Championship. Wales won the match 8–2.

== See also ==
- List of Wales international footballers (alphabetical)
- List of Wales international footballers born outside Wales
