= Ron Hugh =

Welsh footballer

Personal information
- Date of birth: 5 August 1909
- Place of birth: Wales

International career
Years	Team	Apps	(Gls)
1930	Wales	1	(0)

Ron Hugh (born 5 August 1909) was a Welsh international footballer. He was part of the Wales national football team, playing 1 match on 1 February 1930 against Ireland.

== See also ==
- List of Wales international footballers (alphabetical)
