= Ted Morris =

Ted Morris may refer to:

- Teddy Morris (1910–1965), Canadian football player and coach
- Ted Morris (footballer) (1921–2000), Welsh footballer

== See also ==
- Edward Morris (disambiguation)
