= Julius Müller =

Julius Müller may refer to:

- Julius Müller (theologian) (1801–1878), German Protestant theologian
- Julius Müller (footballer) (1964-1933), German footballer
- Julius Müller (racewalker) (1938–2017), German racewalker
- Julius Müller (pole vaulter) (1903–1984), German pole vaulter
- Julius Müller (taekwondo), German taekwondo athlete
- Julius Müller, first person to use the Swiss-system tournament
