= Robert McMillan (footballer) =

Welsh footballer (1857–1928)

Robert John McMillan
Personal information
- Date of birth: 16 November 1857
- Place of birth: Lima, Peru
- Date of death: 1928 (aged 70–71)
- Place of death: Swansea, Wales

Senior career*
Years	Team	Apps	(Gls)
1881	Shrewsbury Engineers		

International career
1881	Wales	2	(0)
- * Club domestic league appearances and goals

Robert McMillan (16 November 1857 – 1928) was a Welsh international footballer. He was part of the Wales national football team, playing 2 matches. He played his first match on 26 February 1881 against England and his last match on 14 March 1881 against Scotland. At Club level he played for Shrewsbury Engineers. McMillan died in 1928.

== See also ==
- List of Wales international footballers (alphabetical)
- List of Wales international footballers born outside Wales
