= Southport F.C. =

Association football club in Southport, England

Coordinates: 53°38′19″N 2°58′45″W

Southport
- Full name: Southport Football Club
- Nicknames: The Sandgrounders; The Port
- Founded: 1888; 138 years ago
- Ground: Haig Avenue
- Capacity: 6,008
- Chairman: Steve Porter
- Manager: Calum McIntyre
- League: National League North
- 2025–26: National League North, 14th of 24
- Website: southportfc.net
Home colours	Away colours	Third colours

Southport Football Club, nicknamed "the Sandgrounders", is an association football club based in Southport, Merseyside. The club competes in the National League North, the sixth level of the English football league system. Their home matches are played at Haig Avenue football stadium.

The club was founded in 1888, with the name Southport Central. Through 1921, they were members of regional leagues, including the Lancashire League, the Lancashire Combination, and The Central League.

From 1921 to 1978, they were a member of The Football League. In 1921, became one of the founding members of the newly formed Football League Third Division North. In 1973, they won the 1972–73 Football League Fourth Division championship. They failed to gain re-election in 1978.

From 1978 to 2004, their association memberships were:

- 1978-1993 - Northern Premier League
- 1993-2003 - Football Conference
- 2003-2004 - Northern Premier League Premier Division

In 2004, Southport was transferred to the new National League North. From 2004 to 2017, they have played in either tier 6 or the tier 5. In 2017, Southport were relegated to the National League North.

== History ==
=== The original amateur club: 1881–1886 ===
Although association football was played in the town's private schools in the late 1870s, the first association club was not formed in the town until November 1881. Bearing the name of Southport Football club, the club originally began as a rugby club, the 'handling code' having been played competitively since 1872.

The man responsible for the decision to switch to association football was a former Welsh international, Thomas Blundell Burnett. He was the instigator of the switch, he was the Secretary of the new club, and he was also the Captain.

The club played its games on a field on a large plot of land opposite to the entrance of Chambres Road on the corner Scarisbrick New Road and Ash Street backing onto Trap Lane (today's Southbank Road), roughly where Westmoreland Road lies today. There was space enough for multiple pitches, one of which was used by Southport Olympic rugby club.

Encouraged by their first year, Southport joined both the Lancashire and English Football Associations and entered the English, Lancashire and Liverpool and District Challenge Cups. The competitive element of the cup-ties aroused most interest. On 7 October, Southport entertained Liverpool Ramblers in their first ever F.A., or English Challenge Cup tie as the competition was called for years. This game was watched by 300 spectators including many women supporters and resulted in a 1–1 draw, Ambler scoring for Southport following a neat pass from Arthur Dalby.

In the 1884–85 season the club merged with the Southport Athletic Society. The team moved to the Sports Ground, on Sussex Road. It was unanimously decided to change their red jerseys for red and white striped flannel shirts. The Reds were thereby now known as “The Stripes”.

As football grew in popularity other clubs sprang up in the town. Southport Wanderers, High Park, Churchtown and Southport Old Boys were amongst the most prominent. However Southport Football Club was considered to be the town's premier side.

Off the field the club was not in a healthy state and in the 1885/86 season they were facing stiff competition from twenty six other clubs in the town. Southport reduced their annual subscriptions to five shillings to try and compete but were later forced to sever their connections with the Athletic Society and in the Athletic Society's Annual report the Committee regretted ‘their unfortunate connection with the Football Club which resulted in the Society incurring an expenditure on their account of £88-3 shillings.

After five years existence Southport's first football club folded.

=== Southport Wanderers: 1884–1888 ===
Southport Wanderers formed as an amateur outfit in 1884 by members of the Southport Olympic rugby club. By the summer of 1886 Wanderers had grown into one of the most popular clubs in the town. In fact, by the time of the demise of the original Southport Football Club they were able to field a first and second eleven on a regular basis, something the original club struggled to do for much of the 1885/1886 season.

At the Wanderers AGM in June 1886, at which a representative of the original Southport association club was present, they invited Southport Football Club to amalgamate

At least six former Southport players and many of their supporters transferred their affiliations to Southport Wanderers. Southport Wanderers moved to a new ground in Scarisbrick New Road for the 1886-87 season. It was a large field, enclosed to a height of 7 foot 6 inches and big enough to accommodate three matches at once. A covered grandstand, to seat 140 spectators, and a dressing tent were provided. Three cows which grazed on the field withdrew behind the grandstand during matches.

At a General Meeting held in the Mather's Saleroom on Chapel Street, it was unanimously resolved that in future the club be called ‘Southport Football Club’ Thus imparting to it a representative character which it had not hitherto enjoyed.

=== A new professional club - Southport Central: 1888-1921 ===
On 2 June 1888 the Southport Guardian newspaper revealed that there was a scheme in the town to provide a football club of ‘Mighty proportions’..by raising an importation team’ Professional football was about to be launched in Southport.

In the summer of 1888, the year the Football League was founded, with the game increasing in popularity, It was felt that a team of stronger calibre should be formed to represent the district The idea met with favour and the initial meeting called to form such a club took place on 12 June at Victoria Galleries, Chapel Street.

At a second meeting, held at the Railway Hotel a week later, Mr. Robert McGown (erroneously reported in the Guardian as “McGowan”), once secretary of the High Park club, successfully proposed that the name of the club should be “Southport Central Association Football Club”.

When the proposition to form a committee was put eleven voted in favour, none against and nineteen abstained. Mr James of Hoghton Street was appointed Honorary Treasurer, Edwin Ramsbottom Secretary and an executive committee was formed.

At a meeting held on 29 August, Mr. J. B. Watson explaining the objects of the club said it was likely to place Southport in the front rank of football with the certain result of bringing increased crowds of visitors to the town and it was confirmed that “Foreign talent” would be introduced by paying players.

The club's record for their initial season was Played 40 Won 21 Drawn 6 Lost 13.

The event which caused the most excitement in the town was the visit of Preston North End who had just carried off the League and Cup double. They came to Southport on 13 May and were given a rapturous welcome on arrival at the railway station. They were driven to the ground behind a marching band. There was a record gate of 3,500 and North End won 4-2 even though Central were re-inforced for the occasion by Forbes, Townley and Southworth of Blackburn Rovers.

The club joined the newly formed Lancashire League. Following the success of the Football League, there was a demand for a County Competition in Lancashire At a meeting organized by the Secretary of the Earlestown club the Lancashire League became a reality. Isaac Smith, Central's Chairman, became the league's first treasurer.

At the start of the 1905–06 season Central moved to its present home, Haig Avenue, which was then known as Ash Lane. In 1911, the club became founder members of the Central League. In 1918, the club was renamed as Southport Vulcan – having been bought by the Vulcan Motor Company – becoming the first club to take a sponsor's name.

=== Football League: 1921–1978 ===
In 1921 the club, now named simply Southport, joined the Football League and became a founder member of the Third Division North. In 1931, Southport became the first club from the Third Division North to reach the sixth round (quarter-finals) of the FA Cup, where they lost 9–1 to Everton. A year later the club recorded its record attendance, when 20,010 watched them play Newcastle United in the fourth round of the FA Cup.

Chart of Southport's table positions since entering the Football league.

Having finished in the bottom half of the table at the end of the 1957–58 season, the club dropped into the Fourth Division following the reorganisation of the Third Division North and Third Division South into Third and Fourth Divisions. The club's first promotion came at the end of the 1966–67 season, when they finished as runners-up in the Fourth Division behind Stockport County under the guidance of Billy Bingham, who later went on to manage the Northern Irish national team. They were relegated back to the Fourth Division in 1970, but won promotion again in 1973 when they finished as Fourth Division Champions. Relegation back to the Fourth Division followed the very next season. This heralded a period of decline as crowds dropped – on some occasions into just three figures – and the ground fell into disrepair.

Disaster struck in 1978, when the club was voted out of the Football League following three consecutive 23rd (out of 24) placed finishes, and was replaced by Wigan Athletic. The clubs drew on the first ballot (when many had expected Rochdale to be voted out), but won the second ballot. Southport was the last club to leave the Football League through the re-election process. Automatic relegation from the Fourth Division was introduced in 1986–87.

=== Non-League football: from 1978 ===
After several seasons with South Liverpool, Brian Kettle was appointed manager and was instrumental in one of the most successful periods. Kettle had a difficult task from the off, his first season in charge saw him start with only three players Andy Johnston, Stuart Bimson and club captain Rob Sturgeon. After a poor start to the season which saw the club in the relegation places until mid-October after bringing in several new players such as Ossie Smith, Bob Howard, Steve Whitehall, Steve Holden, Peter Wright, Alan McDonald, the returning Ian Baines and for the third time Tony Quinn they finished the season in a seventh place in the Northern Premier League, albeit 38 points off the champions Colne Dynamoes who were not accepted for promotion and ultimately folded.

In the 1990–91 season, the club reached 100 league goals in March and four semi-final appearances, losing only one. Ultimately due to the cup runs, the league performance suffered and they finished 5th in the league.

The 1991–92 season started dreadfully for the club due to the loss of key personnel in the summer. Holden and Whitehall both left within weeks, the latter going for a club record £25,000 to Rochdale. Kettle had to rebuild once again, but it didn't go to plan straightaway. The club only managed to win their first game at the start of October. After a series of good runs, they managed to once again finish seventh.

The 1992–93 season was one of the most important seasons in the club's recent history. Southport won the league with 96 points and once again scoring 100 goals and succeeded in two more cup competitions and a FA Cup run, which took them through to the second round proper for the first time since 1968.

In 1998 the club had its first (and only) trip to Wembley, when they lost 1–0 to Cheltenham Town in the final of the FA Trophy. 10,000 Southport fans made the trip to London to see the match.

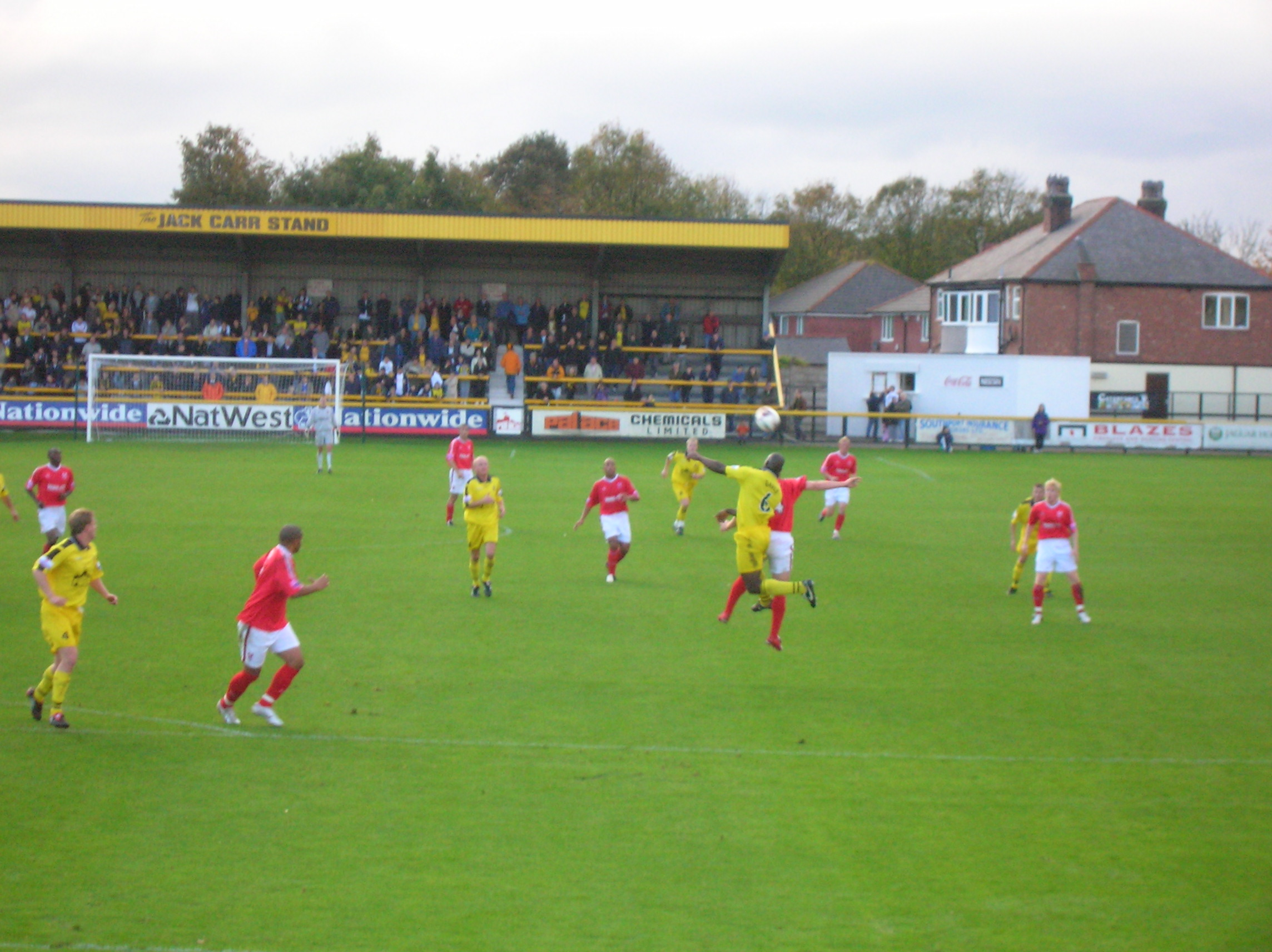
Southport (in yellow) vs Kidderminster Harriers at Haig Avenue, 22 November 2005.

The club were relegated back to the Northern Premier League at the end of the 2002–03 season. They became founder members of the new Conference North in 2004–05, and were the league's first Champions, earning promotion back to the newly renamed Conference National. In the 2005–06 season, Southport spent much of their time at the bottom of the table, but managed to secure survival with a five-game unbeaten run culminating in a 1–1 away draw with third-placed Grays Athletic on 25 April. The manager at the time, Liam Watson, stated that this feat was more impressive than their title winning accomplishments the season before.

=== Full-time: 2006–2008 ===
In 2006 the club changed to full-time, with Liam Watson moving to Burscough at the end of the season a new manager in Paul Cook was appointed. This led to a massive overhaul of the squad, with many players unwilling or unable to go full-time. This proved to be a disastrous turn of events. Cook had to assemble a complete squad with just six of the original squad remaining. After a run of poor results, his contract was terminated on 3 January 2007.

The first match after Cook's departure saw Dino Maamria and Steve Whitehall take over as caretaker manager team and they succeeded in leading the team to a 3–1 home win over free-falling Grays, a match which also saw Carl Baker make his 100th appearance in a Southport shirt.

The only other match which saw the Maamria-Whitehall manager team was a 2–1 defeat in the FA Trophy at the hands of Salisbury before Peter Davenport, who had previously had an unbeaten spell as caretaker-manager of the club in 2001, was named as Cook's successor two weeks later.

Davenport's new team, aided with decent signings in the transfer window, started to churn out decent results. This did not last long however, and, due to Southport's ability to concede late goals in most games, the club looked certain to drop down a league, however again doubts were cast as the club won 4 matches on the run, and with two matches left were only two points off safety. However these matches were against play off hopefuls York City and Exeter City. After losing to a Clayton Donaldson penalty against York, the Sandgrounders were relegated the following Tuesday, not even playing a game, after relegation rivals Grays and Halifax both won their games.

The club stayed full-time, looking to bounce straight back up from the Conference North to the top of non-League football.

Southport signed Neil Prince and Karl Noon from Stalybridge Celtic and Marine respectively. Peter Davenport also brought in goalkeeper Richard Whiteside, midfielder Dave Prout and right back Chris Lever after trials from Oldham. The biggest news in the transfer period for Southport fans however, was the departure of star right winger Carl Baker to Morecambe, for a fee believed to be £50,000.

Southport Football Club announced on Monday 7 April 2008 that manager Peter Davenport and assistant Huw Griffiths left the club with immediate effect. The club placed on record their appreciation for everything they both contributed to Southport Football Club.

Former player Gary Brabin was initially given the job until the end of the season and guided the team into the play-offs only to go out on penalties away at Stalybridge Celtic, however only three days later the club announced their ambitions early by appointing him full-time and thus keeping their full-time playing status for another season at least. However, this appointment turned out to be only an agreement to sign a future contract, and after an approach from Cambridge United, Brabin left Southport to sign as Cambridge manager on 23 June 2008.

=== Return to part-time: from 2008 ===
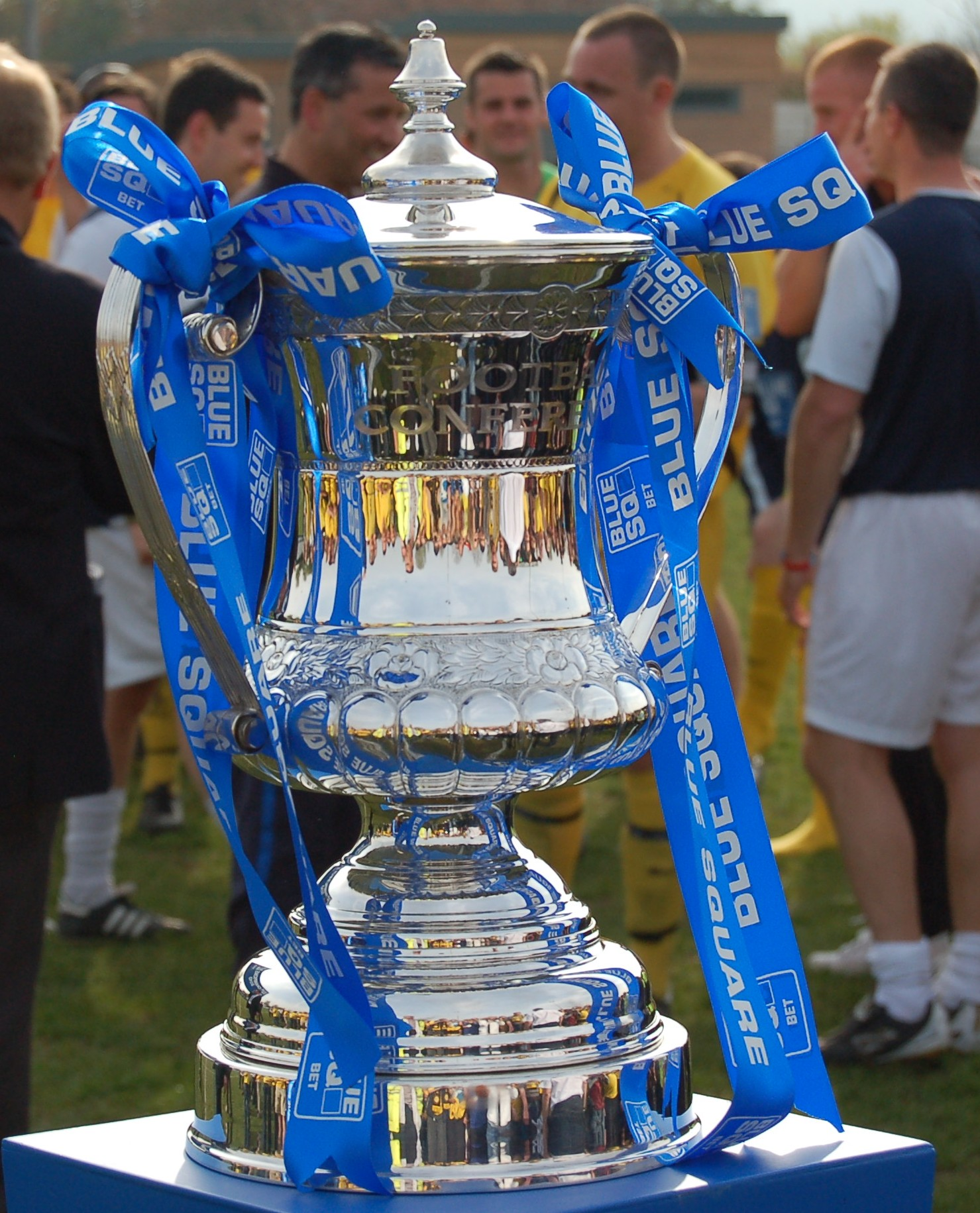
Conference North trophy awarded to Southport, 2009–10 season.

On 30 June 2008 the club's official website confirmed that Liam Watson had rejoined Southport as first team manager following his resignation from Burscough.

This change saw the arrival of numerous part-time players, following Watson from Burscough including Conference North top scorer Ciaran Kilheeney, Watson's co-Players of the Year – Adam Flynn and Anthony McMillan, as well former Southport players, Matty McGinn, Earl Davis, Robbie Booth and Steve Daly. Retained players, Michael Powell and Neil Robinson, chose to return to part-time football, whilst Matt Hocking, Neil Prince and club captain, Chris Holland left the club. Kevin Lee and Tony Gray signed new part-time contracts at the start of the season, and thus Southport practically returned fully to a part-time club. During that season Tony Gray and John Doolan departed the club, as well as Craig Noone, who moved to Championship side Plymouth Argyle.

The 2008–09 season saw Southport reach the Conference North play-offs, having finished in fifth place. However, a home defeat, followed by an away draw against Gateshead left Southport to battle for a further season in the Conference North. Only four defeats during 2009–10 saw Southport finally secure the League title following a 3–0 away victory at Eastwood Town on the final Saturday of the season, spurred on by over 700 travelling Sandgrounders. They finished just one point ahead of near neighbours Fleetwood Town. The success of the first team, who also lifted the Lancashire FA Challenge Trophy following victory against Clitheroe at the Reebok Stadium, was mirrored by the club's youth team who won both the Lancashire League and Conference North Youth League.

=== Non-League top flight (2010 to 2017) ===
In 2010–11, the first season back in the Conference, Southport finished in the relegation zone of the Conference National, but were reprieved after Rushden & Diamonds were expelled from the league.

The 2011–12 season saw a change of fortune for the club, with the implementation of a new, extended training schedule seeing an upturn in performances and results. On 26 November 2011, a club record of consecutive away victories was broken with the Sandgrounder's 1–0 win at Stockport County, their 8th in succession. Although narrowly missing out on a play off spot, having occupied one of the top five positions for long periods of the season, the 2011–12 season saw the 'Port finish in a very impressive 7th place, the club's highest league finish in 10 years.

During the 2012–13 season Southport failed to repeat its successful performance in the prior season and finished 5th from bottom, just one place above the relegation zone. On 17 April 2013 it was announced that Watson would be leaving Southport once again, but on more amiable terms resigning, ostensibly, in order to 'take a break from the game'. Soon after, he was appointed manager of AFC Telford who he led to promotion in his first season.

On 15 May 2013, Alan Wright was appointed Southport manager, along with John Hills as his assistant manager. Southport kicked off the 2013–14 season with a 1–0 home win over Luton Town, just the beginning of a good start to the season, Wright managed the team to four straight home wins. However the good form didn't last long, a run of 8 straight defeats away from home saw Wright's side drop to the lower half of the table. A 2–2 draw to Macclesfield ended the losing away run, followed by a 6–2 victory over Marske United in the FA Cup 4th Qualifying Round and a 1–0 win against previously unbeaten table toppers Cambridge United. This looked like a catalyst for a turnaround in fortunes, however Southport lost their next six games, eliminated from both the FA Cup and FA Trophy, and sat in 18th place in the table, Alan Wright left the club on Friday 7 December 2013.

His replacement was named just a day later on Saturday 8 December 2013, as John Coleman, former Accrington Stanley manager, who had previously played for Southport over 25 years earlier. Under Coleman the club escaped relegation, finishing the season in fine form. This spell also led to a change in the club's training schedule, with sessions during the day, rather than evening, unlike a majority of part-time clubs.

To the consternation of the fans, Coleman was not retained as manager; instead the Board appointed Martin Foyle formerly the manager of Hereford United. A number of first team players left the club at the end of the season (including several who had been on loan) leaving Foyle with a major rebuilding task for the 2014–15 season. Foyle was dismissed in October 2014 and replaced by Gary Brabin who returned to the club for his second spell as manager. Despite a run in the FA Cup culminating in a spirited third round defeat to Championship side Derby County, Brabin's spell was short lived, accepting an academy role with Everton. Paul Carden, previously assistant to Brabin, became manager and was joined by Alex Russell as assistant manager, son of the club legend of the same name. The club secured Conference survival yet again in 2015, finishing 19th in the league.

Carden's team started the 2015–16 season in poor form, leading to his departure from the club in November 2015, Dino Maamria became Southport's seventh manager since April 2013 shortly after. On 19 March 2016 Andy Bishop was appointed caretaker player/manager of the club after Dino Maamria left the club for family reasons.

On 6 September 2016, Liam Watson was announced as returning to Southport for the third time but in a new capacity. Watson joined the board of directors along with local businessmen Nigel Allen and David Barron. He will take up the newly created role as Operations Director. Steve Burr was announced as the manager of Southport on 8 September 2016 following the departure of Andy Bishop 5 days earlier.

On 30 January 2017 Steve Burr was sacked after a poor run of form and being one point above the drop zone. Andy Preece was appointed Manager on 8 February, their eleventh since April 2013 but another poor run of form saw them slip to the foot of the table in March. On Friday 14 April 2017, Southport relegation to the National League North was confirmed after a 3–0 loss to Dover Athletic. Following confirmation of relegation, long term chairman Charlie Clapham announced he would be stepping from the board of directors on 21 April 2017, along with vice-chairman Sam Shrouder. Southport then parted ways with Manager Andy Preece on 5 May 2017.

=== National League North and new board ===
On 15 May 2017 it was announced that local accountant and supporter James Treadwell would become the club's new chairman, his first appointment was to welcome back former manager Mark Wright as Head of Development. Southport appointed Alan Lewer as manager on 30 May 2017. The 2017–18 season started well for the new management team, winning the five of their first eight league games. Following supporter's campaigning since May, law firm director Phil Hodgkinson joined the board of directors on 5 September 2017. Having lost their next six games after this date, Wright and Lewer were dismissed on 26 September 2017.

Kevin Davies was appointed manager on 18 October 2017 on a two-and-a-half-year contract. Southport secured survival on 21 April 2018 despite losing 1–0 to Brackley Town. Despite this, Davies was dismissed as manager on 30 April 2018. After a spell scouting for Scunthorpe United, Liam Watson was reappointed manager of Southport on 7 May 2018.

It was confirmed during the summer of 2019 that Phil Hodgkinson would step down as Southport's owner and director so that he could replace Dean Hoyle as majority shareholder and chairman of Championship club Huddersfield Town. On his departure from Southport, Hodgkinson sold his shares to Ian Kyle, Steve Porter and manager, Liam Watson, to create a new-look boardroom.

Long serving manager Liam Watson stepped back from this role after a poor start to the 2023/34 season, to focus on his position as Club Director. Jim Bentley was appointed the club's new manager on 29 August 2023.

=== New ownership (2023) ===
On 27 October 2023, it was announced that Big Help Group had acquired Southport FC and become the majority shareholder following the purchase of Ian Kyle's shares. The former chairman has subsequently been succeeded by Big Help Group's CEO, Peter Mitchell.

On 10 November, 2023, Southport FC, under the new ownership of the Big Help Group, held its first Fan Forum since the takeover. This significant event featured Assistant Manager Andy Burgess announcing the introduction of GPS vests in player training, signifying a step towards modernizing training methods and enhancing player performance analytics.

At the forum, Peter Mitchell shared his vision for the club, stating, "We aspire to be a full-time football club, I don't know when we're going to be able to reach that aspiration, but absolutely we aspire to be in full-time football." He further emphasized the club's financial commitment towards this goal, revealing, "We've committed to a quarter of a million pound of equity investment now, and we've also committed to a further quarter of a million pounds for the start of next season."

The event also highlighted plans for infrastructure development at the club's football ground. Mitchell discussed the board's deliberations on enhancing the ground, saying, "We've just been talking about it at the board meeting, about putting a plan together for the ground. I'm going to look at getting plans drawn up for a two-story changing facility to the left of the main stand, where we can have dressing rooms and changing rooms for the two teams and officials, and some offices above it." He added that he intends to submit planning permissions with Sefton Council for this project, in a bid to get the "off the field facilities right", so they have better chances of being accepted into the Football League.

On 12 March, 2025, manager Jim Bentley and assistant manager Alan Morgan were dismissed from their roles after a run of poor games, including a 1-0 loss away the day prior to local rivals Marine A.F.C.. It was announced the same day that player-manager David Morgan would oversee the men's first team until a new management team is appointed.

=== Further takeover (2025) ===
On 14 May 2025, David Cunningham released a statement confirming that the Big Help Group, along with Peter Mitchell and the rest of the board, were no longer involved with the club, with ownership being transferred to Cunningham and Kieran Malone. On 6 June, it was announced that the takeover of the club had been officially completed.

On 12 May 2025, the club announced the signing of Neil Danns as the new First Team Manager. The club had a tough start to the season, with 9 losses in the first 13 league games. Following a 3-2 loss at home to Peterborough Sports, the club went on an 11 game unbeaten run. The second half of the season had mixed results and the club finished in 14th. The main talking point of the season was an impressive run in the FA Trophy, beating National League teams Eastleigh and Yeovil. They were beaten 3-1 at home by eventual winners Southend United in the Semi Final.

On 6 September 2026, the club announced that Danns would step aside from his role as First Team Manager, with assistant manager Mark Duffy taking over until a replacement has been decided.

== Summary of recent seasons ==
Year	League	Level	Pld	W	D	L	GF	GA	GD	Pts	Position	Leading league scorer	Goals	FA Cup	FA Trophy	Average attendance
2003–04	NPL Premier Division	6	44	20	10	14	71	52	+19	70	6th of 23; Transferred	Neil Robinson	14	QR2	R2	809
2004–05	Conference North	6	42	25	9	8	83	45	+38	84	1st of 22; Promoted	Terry Fearns	33	R1	R4	1004
2005–06	Conference National	5	42	10	10	22	36	68	−32	40	18th of 22	Steve Daly	12	R1	R3	1244
2006–07	Conference National	5	46	11	14	21	57	67	−10	47	23rd of 24; Relegated	Carl Baker	11	QR4	R2	1200
2007–08	Conference North	6	42	22	11	9	77	50	+27	77	4th of 22; Lost in PO Semifinal	Tony Gray	19	QR4	R1	1014
2008–09	Conference North	6	42	21	13	8	63	36	+27	76	5th of 22; Lost in PO Semifinal	Ciaran Kilheeney	16	QR3	QF	899
2009–10	Conference North	6	40	25	11	4	91	45	+46	86	1st of 21; Promoted	Steve Daly	18	R1	R1	924
2010–11	Conference National	5	46	11	13	22	56	77	−21	46	21st of 24	Shaun Whalley	8	R1	R1	1152
2011–12	Conference National	5	46	21	13	12	72	69	+3	76	7th of 24	Tony Gray	24	R1	R1	1290
2012–13	Conference National	5	46	14	12	20	72	86	−14	54	20th of 24	Chris Almond	11	QR4	QF	958
2013–14	Conference National	5	46	14	11	21	53	71	−18	53	18th of 24	Danny Hattersley	10	R1	R1	1049
2014–15	Conference National	5	46	13	12	21	47	72	−25	51	19th of 24	Richard Brodie	12	R3	R1	1070
2015–16	National League	5	46	14	13	19	52	65	−13	55	16th of 24	Louis Almond	12	QR4	R2	1133
2016–17	National League	5	46	10	9	27	52	97	−45	39	23rd of 24; Relegated	Jamie Allen	10	R1	R2	1425
2017–18	National League North	6	42	14	8	20	60	72	-12	50	15th of 22	Jason Gilchrist	15	QR2	QR3	1012
2018–19	National League North	6	42	13	14	15	58	55	-3	50	14th of 22	Jack Sampson	15	R2	R1	1071
2019–20	National League North (Season Suspended)	6	32	12	7	13	40	41	-2	50	12th of 22	David Morgan	10	QR4	R2	1003
2020–21	National League North (Season Suspended)	6	14	4	4	6	16	19	-3	16	17th of 22	Jordan Archer	4	QR3	R5	0
2021–22	National League North	6	42	14	15	13	60	65	5	57	11th of 22	Jordan Archer	22	QR4	R4	1081
2022–23	National League North	6	46	13	11	22	50	62	-12	50	18th of 24	Jordan Archer	10	QR2	R2	1022
2023-24	National League North	6	46	16	8	22	54	75	-21	56	17th of 24	Marcus Carver	12	QR2	R3	1081
2024–25	National League North	6	46	13	14	19	43	58	-15	53	18th of 24	Danny Lloyd	12	QR3	R4	1312

== Trust in Yellow ==
Trust in Yellow is the Supporters' Trust of the club. It was formed on 26 April 2006 by a set of supporters who were unhappy with the lack of communication between the club and its fans in an effort to get more involved and have a bigger say in the running of the club. T.I.Y. is a member of Supporters' Direct, a body funded by Sport England. In 2021, the Trust funded the building of a new Fanzone building inside the club's stadium, however since the completion of this project the Trust has been effectively defunct.

== Players ==
=== Current squad ===
As of 18 August 2026

Note: Flags indicate national team as defined under FIFA eligibility rules; some limited exceptions apply. Players may hold more than one non-FIFA nationality.

No.	Pos.	Nation	Player
1	GK	ENG	Solomon Honor (on loan from Manchester United)
2	DF	ENG	Dan Pike
3	DF	ENG	Dylan Dwyer
4	DF	ENG	Ted Lavelle
5	DF	ENG	Kyle Jameson
6	DF	ENG	Max Davies (on loan from Blackburn Rovers)
7	MF	ENG	Danny Lloyd (Captain)
8	MF	ENG	Luke Griffiths
9	FW	ENG	Jordan Slew
10	FW	ENG	Sol Solomon
11	FW	ENG	Kurt Willoughby
12	DF	ENG	Matty Williams
13	GK	ENG	Tony McMillan
14	DF	ENG	Harry Flowers
15	DF	ENG	Harry Perritt

No.	Pos.	Nation	Player
16	MF	ENG	Ben Wynne
17	MF	ENG	Christy Edwards
18	MF	ENG	Regan Griffiths
19	FW	ENG	Daniel Ogwuru
20	MF	ENG	Luke Burgess
21	FW	SCO	Cameron Ferguson
22	DF	ENG	Sam Minihan (Vice Captain)
23	MF	ENG	Alfie Cunningham
26	FW	ENG	Adam Moseley (on loan from Wigan Athletic)
27	GK	ENG	Douglass Lukjanciks (on loan from Everton)
28	FW	ENG	Rhys Healey
29	MF	ENG	Nathan Willis
32	MF	ENG	Mikey O'Neill
--	MF	ENG	Scott Burgess

== Club officials ==
Board of directors

- Chairman: (England) Steve Porter
- Director: (England) Kieran Malone
- Director: (England) David Cunningham
- Director: (England) Liam Watson
- Secretary: (England) Mark Lockyear
- Operations Manager & Community: (England) Scott Blundell
- Events: (England) Pam Jameson
- Head of Media: (England) Rob Urwin

Coaching and medical staff

- Manager: (England) Calum McIntyre
- Assistant Manager: (England) Colin Woodthorpe
- Coach: (England) Luke Gibson
- Coach: (England) Will Craggs
- P&F Coach: (England) Ryan Parfitt
- Goalkeeping Coach: (England) Tony McMillan
- Physiotherapist: (England) Daniel Gabrielson
- Kit Manager: (England) Hamish Morton

== Records ==
=== Southport Central FC ===
- Best FA Cup performance: Third round, 1884–85

=== Southport FC ===
- Best FA Cup performance: Quarter-finals, 1930–31
- Best League Cup performance: Second round, 1962–63, 1963–64, 1968–69, 1969–70, 1971–72, 1972–73, 1975–76, 1977–78 (replay)
- Best League Trophy performance: First round, 2001–02, 2002–03
- Best FA Trophy performance: Runners-up, 1997–98

== Honours ==
League

- Fourth Division (level 4)
  - Champions: 1972–73
  - Runners-up: 1966–67
- Conference North
  - Champions: 2004–05, 2009–10
- Northern Premier League
  - Champions: 1992–93

Cup

- Third Division North Cup
  - Winners: 1937–38
- FA Trophy
  - Runners-up: 1997–98
- Lancashire Senior Cup
  - Winners: 1904–05
- Lancashire Junior Cup
  - Winners (12): 1919–20, 1992–93, 1996–97, 1997–98, 2000–01, 2005–06, 2007–08, 2009–10, 2018–19, 2021–22, 2022–23, 2024-25
- Liverpool Senior Cup
  - Winners (12): 1930–31, 1931–32, 1943–44, 1962–63, 1974–75, 1990–91, 1992–93, 1998–99, 2011–12, 2018–19
- Northern Premier League Challenge Cup
  - Winners: 1990–91
