= Richard Gough (Welsh footballer) =

Welsh footballer (1860 - 1934)

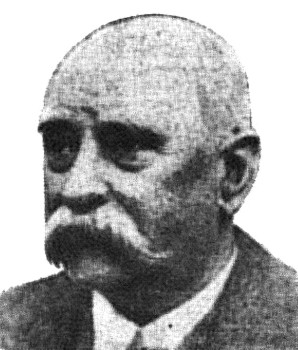

Personal information
- Full name: Richard Thomas Gough
- Date of birth: 1859
- Place of birth: Oswestry, England
- Date of death: 2 February 1934 (aged 74–75)
- Place of death: Oswestry, England
- Position: Goalkeeper

Senior career*
Years	Team	Apps	(Gls)
1877–1883	Oswestry White Star		
1883–87	Oswestry		

International career
1883	Wales	1	(0)
- * Club domestic league appearances and goals

Richard Thomas Gough (April–June 1859 – 2 February 1934) was an English Wales international footballer. He was part of the Wales national football team, playing 1 match on 12 March 1883 against Scotland.

== Football career ==
Tom Gough played for Oswestry Town between 1877 and 1887. He first played as a half-back before eventually becoming a goalkeeper. He won the Welsh Cup with Oswestry FC in 1884.

After retiring from playing he became a referee, and took charge of two international games.

He also became president of the Shropshire FA.

In 1911 he became president of the Football Association of Wales.

== Cricket career ==
Gough was also a cricketer who played at county level for Shropshire between 1884 and 1903 and at club level for Oswestry. Two brothers, Walter George (1857-1908) and Herbert (Bert) Gough (1873-1954) also played at both levels.

== Honours ==
Oswestry

- Welsh Cup Winner: 1884

== See also ==
- List of Wales international footballers (alphabetical)
