= Fred Kelly (footballer) =

Welsh footballer (1877–1957)

Personal information
- Full name: Frederick Charles Kelly
- Date of birth: 1877
- Place of birth: Sandycroft, Wales
- Date of death: 23 July 1957 (aged 79–80)
- Place of death: Flixton, England
- Position: Outside right

Senior career*
Years	Team	Apps	(Gls)
1899–1901	Wrexham	12	(4)
1902–1903	Druids		

International career
1899–1902	Wales	3	(0)
- * Club domestic league appearances and goals

Frederick Charles Kelly (1877 – 23 July 1957) was a Welsh footballer who played as an outside right.

He was part of the Wrexham squad in 1899–1900.

He was part of the Wales national team between 1899 and 1902, playing three matches. He played his first match on 4 March 1899 against Ireland and his last match on 22 February 1902 against Ireland.

In 1903 he was reported as playing for Druids.

== See also ==
- List of Wales international footballers (alphabetical)
- List of Wales international footballers born outside Wales
