= Frederick Hughes (footballer) =

Welsh footballer (1860–1923)

Personal information
- Date of birth: 1860
- Place of birth: England
- Date of death: 10 November 1923 (aged 63)
- Place of death: Northwich, England

International career
Years	Team	Apps	(Gls)
1882–1884	Wales	6	(0)

Frederick Hughes (1860 – 10 November 1923) was a Welsh international footballer. He was part of the Wales national football team between 1882 and 1884, playing 6 matches. He played his first match on 25 February 1882 against Ireland and his last match on 29 March 1884 against Scotland. In 1923, Hughes was found drowned in the River Dane.

== See also ==
- List of Wales international footballers (alphabetical)
- List of Wales international footballers born outside Wales
