= Jack Bowdler =

Welsh footballer

Charlie Bowdler
Personal information
- Full name: John Charles Henry Bowdler
- Date of birth: December 1868
- Place of birth: Shrewsbury, England
- Date of death: 1927 (aged 58–59)
- Position: Winger

Senior career*
Years	Team	Apps	(Gls)
1885–1890	Shrewsbury Town		
1890–1892	Wolverhampton Wanderers	24	(3)
1892–1893	Blackburn Rovers	22	(5)
1893	Shrewsbury Town		
Total		46	(8)

International career
1890–1894	Wales	5	(3)
- * Club domestic league appearances and goals

John Charles Henry Bowdler also known as Jack Bowdler and sometimes as Charlie (1870 – 18 July 1927) was a Welsh footballer. He was part of the Wales national football team between 1890 and 1894, playing 5 matches and scoring 3 goals. He played his first match on 8 February 1890 against Ireland and his last match on 12 March 1894 against England.

He played at club level for Shrewsbury Town, of which he was a founder player, Wolverhampton Wanderers and Blackburn Rovers prior to beginning his practice as a solicitor.

== Early life ==
Bowdler was born in 1870, son of John Charles Bowdler, a Shrewsbury solicitor. Harry Ernest Bowdler, also known as Ernie, another Wales football international, was his brother.

He was educated at Shrewsbury School, which he attended from 1884 to 1888.

== Professional and public life ==
He was admitted a solicitor in 1895, after serving articles under John Hawley Edwards, a former England and Wales international footballer, and another solicitor in Shrewsbury. He practiced in the town lifelong, with office in Swan Hill. He founded the law firm J C H Bowdler & Sons of Shrewsbury which later merged with the Lanyons of Wellington in 1988. The firm is now a full-service law firm named Lanyon Bowdler, located in Shrewsbury.

Bowdler was a Freemason, initiated into the Salopian Lodge of Charity in 1899.

From 1901 to his death he sat as a Conservative member for Belle Vue ward on Shrewsbury Borough Council, and was Conservative agent for the Shrewsbury constituency under its then MPs Sir Clement Lloyd Hill and George Butler Lloyd. During the First World War he served as a corporal in the Shropshire Regiment of the Volunteer Training Corps.

== Football career ==
He was described in his obituary as 'a speedy winger and a deadly shot in goal'. Bowdler was in the Shrewsbury School's school football XI from 1885 to 1888, being team captain in the latter year. It was while at school he and his brother became players at Shrewsbury Town in 1886. He later served on the committee of the club as secretary and chairman and once maintained the club for a whole month at his own expense during the early 1900s. He played for Shrewsbury Town up to 1890 and again during 1893.

Bowdler later joined Wolverhampton Wanderers, with whom he played in the FA Cup ties of the seasons of 1889-90 to semi-final when Wolves were beaten 1-0 by Cup winners Blackburn Rovers, 1890-91, and 1891-92. He transferred to Blackburn Rovers with whom he played in the FA Cup competitions of 1892-93 to semi-final when Rovers were ironically beaten 1-0 by Wolves, and 1893-94. Both clubs, unlike Shrewsbury Town in his lifetime, were in the Football League. He gave up playing with Rovers prior to beginning his legal practice in 1895.

== Other sports interests ==
Bowdler participated in Shrewsbury School athletics and was Senior Whip of the "Royal Shrewsbury School Hunt", in fact the school's cross-country running club, also known as 'the harriers', in 1888. He also played crown green bowls as a member of the Shrewsbury Severnside Bowling Club (founded 1895) and took part in a number of inter-county matches.

== Personal life ==
He married in 1901 Agnes, daughter of Benjamin Timmis, farmer, of Westbury, Shropshire and had three sons and a daughter. He died from heart failure at his home, Oakfield House in South Hermitage, Belle Vue, Shrewsbury on 18 July 1927 aged 56 and was buried on 20 July at Shrewsbury General Cemetery in Longden Road.

== See also ==
- List of Wales international footballers (alphabetical)
