= William Harrison (Welsh footballer) =

Irish-born Welsh footballer

Personal information
- Full name: William Clare Harrison
- Date of birth: 1872
- Place of birth: Portsmouth, England
- Date of death: 1920 (aged 47–48)
- Place of death: Wrexham, Wales

Senior career*
Years	Team	Apps	(Gls)
-1893	Wrexham Gymnasium		
1893-1906	Wrexham	118	(33)

International career
1899–1901	Wales	5	(0)
- * Club domestic league appearances and goals

William Harrison (born 1872) was an English-born Welsh international footballer. Despite some secondary sources claiming he was born in Ireland, primary sources show he was born in Portsmouth, England to Irish parentage.

In 1892, he was part of the Wrexham Gymnasium team that reached the final of the Welsh Junior Cup. Harrison scored in the final as Gymnasium lost 3-1 to Llandudno Swifts at Rhyl. The following season, Harrison won the Welsh Junior Cup when Wrexham Gymnasium beat Wrockwardine Wood 1-0 in the final at Wrexham.

He was part of the Wales national football team between 1899 and 1901, playing 5 matches. He played his first match on 20 March 1899 against England and his last match on 23 March 1901 against Ireland.

At club level, he played for Wrexham between 1893 and 1906. He was the publican of The Turf, the pub which still adjoins Wrexham AFC's Racecourse ground. The Turf being (then but no longer) a country inn, its grounds were used to make the pitch of the Racecourse, and until recently the balcony of The Turf looked over it.

Harrison died in September 1920 at the Turf Hotel at the age of 48. He was buried in Wrexham.

== See also ==
- List of Wales international footballers (alphabetical)
