= Dennis Heywood =

Welsh footballer

Personal information
- Date of birth: April 1852
- Place of birth: Prestwich, Lancashire, England
- Date of death: January 1936
- Place of death: Essex, England
- Position: Left wing

Senior career*
Years	Team	Apps	(Gls)
1877	Chester College		
–1879	Oswestry		
1880–1882	Druids		

International career
1879	Wales	1	(0)
- * Club domestic league appearances and goals

Dennis Heywood (born April 1852) was an English international footballer, who played for the Wales national football team, who played one match on 18 January 1879 against England.

== See also ==
- List of Wales international footballers (alphabetical)
- List of Wales international footballers born outside Wales
