= Ernie Bowdler =

British association football player

Personal information
- Date of birth: 1872
- Place of birth: England
- Date of death: 24 May 1921 (aged 48)
- Place of death: Shrewsbury, England
- Position: Forward

International career
Years	Team	Apps	(Gls)
1893	Wales	1	(0)

Harry Ernest Bowdler (1872 – 24 May 1921) was a Welsh footballer. He was part of the Wales national football team, playing 1 match on 18 March 1893 against Scotland.

== Early life ==
Bowdler was born in 1872, son of John Charles Bowdler, a Shrewsbury solicitor, and educated at Shrewsbury School, attending from 1887 to 1893. John Charles Henry Bowdler (a.k.a. Jack), also a Wales international, was his brother.

== Playing career ==
While at Shrewsbury School Bowdler played in the school football XI.

At the same period he with his brother was one of the formative players in the Shrewsbury Town team after the club's foundation in 1886 but unlike him did not play in the Football League competitions.

He was the unexpected cause of one unusual incident at a Shrewsbury Town home match to a visiting team from St George's in playing for the Shropshire League Cup in March 1893. During the second half the visiting team's right-back defender kicked out at Bowdler; this sparked a pitch invasion when Bowdler's father got up from among the spectators to remonstrate with the errant player, and caused the match to be called off 15 minutes before time.

== Public life ==
He became a solicitor, working with his brother Jack's offices at Swan Hill, Shrewsbury. He was Assistant Overseer of the parishes of St Chad and St Alkmund in Shrewsbury as well as the neighbouring rural parishes of Uffington, Withington and Battlefield.

== Personal life ==
Bowdler died after an appendicitis operation in a Shrewsbury nursing home on 24 May 1921 aged 48 and was buried in Shrewsbury General Cemetery in Longden Road on 27 May. His home at time of his death was at Villa Nova, Sutton Road, Shrewsbury. He was survived by a wife and one daughter.

== See also ==
- List of Wales international footballers (alphabetical)
