= Morda Road =

Cricket ground in Oswestry, Shropshire, England

Coordinates: 52°51′02.21″N 3°03′29.34″W

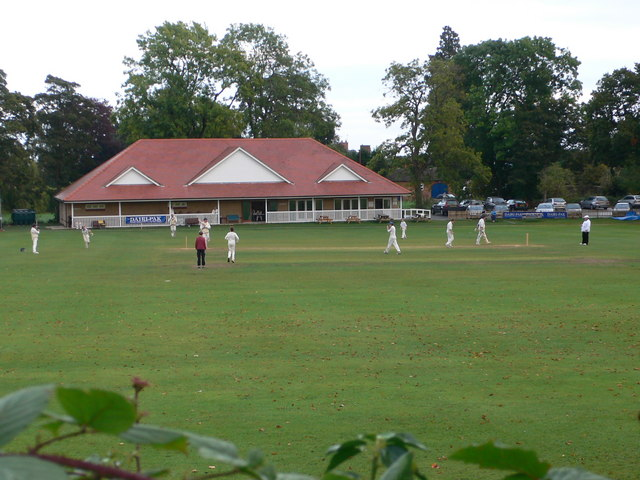

Ground information
- Location: Oswestry, Shropshire
- Establishment: 1964 (first recorded match)

Team information
Shropshire	(1964-1980 & 1990-present)
- As of 15 August 2010; Source: Ground profile

Morda Road is a cricket ground in Oswestry, Shropshire. The first recorded match on the ground was in 1964, when Shropshire played their first Minor Counties Championship match at the ground against the Somerset Second XI. From 1964 to 2000, the ground hosted 18 Minor Counties Championship matches. From 2000 to present, the ground has 6 MCCA Knockout Trophy matches.

The ground has also held a single List-A match between Shropshire and Northumberland in the 2004 Cheltenham & Gloucester Trophy, which was played in 2003.

In local domestic cricket, Morda Road is the home ground of Oswestry Cricket Club, who play in the Birmingham and District Premier League Division Three.
