= Jim Edwards (footballer, born 1874) =

Welsh footballer

Personal information
- Full name: James Alfred Edwards
- Date of birth: 1874
- Place of birth: England
- Date of death: 1939 (aged 64–65)

International career
Years	Team	Apps	(Gls)
1895–1897	Wales	3	(0)

Jim Edwards (1874 – 1939) was a Welsh international footballer. He was part of the Wales national football team between 1895 and 1897, playing 3 matches. He played his first match on 16 March 1895 against Ireland and his last match on 29 March 1897 against England.

== See also ==
- List of Wales international footballers (alphabetical)
