= Edward Morris (footballer) =

Welsh footballer

Personal information
- Date of birth: 1872
- Place of birth: England

International career
| Years | Team | Apps | (Gls) |
| 1893 | Wales | 3 | (0) |

Edward Morris (born 1872) was a Welsh international footballer. He was part of the Wales national football team, playing 3 matches. He played his first match on 13 March 1893 against England and his last match on 5 April 1893 against Ireland.

== See also ==
- List of Wales international footballers (alphabetical)
- List of Wales international footballers born outside Wales
