= John Edward Davies =

Welsh footballer (1862–1912)

John Davies
Personal information
- Date of birth: 1862
- Place of birth: Wales
- Date of death: 1912 (aged 49–50)
- Position: Forward

Senior career*
Years	Team	Apps	(Gls)
- Oswestry

International career
1885	Wales	1	(0)
- * Club domestic league appearances and goals

John Davies (1862 – 1912) was a Welsh international footballer. He was part of the Wales national football team, playing 1 match on 14 March 1885 against England. At club level, he played for Oswestry.

== See also ==
- List of Wales international footballers (alphabetical)
