= Edward Shaw (footballer) =

Welsh footballer

Personal information
- Date of birth: 1864
- Place of birth: England

International career
Years	Team	Apps	(Gls)
1882–1884	Wales	3	(2)

Edward Shaw (born 1864) was a Welsh international footballer. He was part of the Wales national football team between 1882 and 1884, playing 3 matches and scoring 2 goals. He played his first match on 25 February 1882 against Ireland and his last match on 29 March 1884 against Scotland. He scored in the match at Wrexham's Racecourse Ground on 9 February 1884 against Ireland. Wales ran out comfortable victors with a score of 6–0 with two goals of Shaw.

His nephew was the poet Wilfred Owen.

== See also ==
- List of Wales international footballers (alphabetical)
- List of Wales international footballers born outside Wales
