= George Williams (footballer, born 1879) =

Wales international footballer (1879–1916)

Personal information
- Full name: George Owen Williams
- Date of birth: September 1879
- Place of birth: Birmingham, England
- Date of death: 27 July 1916 (aged 36)
- Place of death: Somme, France
- Position: Half back

Senior career*
Years	Team	Apps	(Gls)
- Monway
- Oldbury
–1900	Wednesbury Old Athletic		
1900–1902	West Bromwich Albion	16	(0)
- Brierley Hill Alliance
- Kidderminster Harriers
- Wrexham
- Stafford Rangers
- Willenhall Swifts
- Walsall

International career
1907	Wales	1	(0)
- * Club domestic league appearances and goals

George Owen Williams (September 1879 – 27 July 1916) was a Welsh semi-professional footballer who played in the Football League for West Bromwich Albion as a half back. He was capped by Wales at international level.

== Personal life ==
Williams served as a rifleman in the King's Royal Rifle Corps during the First World War and was killed during the Battle of the Somme on 27 July 1916. He is commemorated on the Thiepval Memorial.

== Career statistics ==
Appearances and goals by club, season and competition
Club	Season	League			National Cup		Total	
Club	Season	Division	Apps	Goals	Apps	Goals	Apps	Goals
West Bromwich Albion	1900–01	First Division	15	0	2	0	17	0
West Bromwich Albion	1901–02	Second Division	1	0	0	0	1	0
Career total			16	0	2	0	18	0

== See also ==
- List of Wales international footballers (alphabetical)
