= James Morris (footballer, born 1864) =

Welsh footballer

Personal information
- Date of birth: 1864
- Place of birth: England
- Date of death: 16 July 1915 (aged 50–51)
- Position: Midfielder

International career
Years	Team	Apps	(Gls)
1887	Wales	1	(0)

James Morris (1864 – 16 July 1915) was a Welsh male international football midfielder. He was part of the Wales national team, earning one cap in a match against Scotland on 21 March 1887.

== See also ==
- List of Wales international footballers (alphabetical)
- List of Wales international footballers born outside Wales
