= George Higham =

Welsh footballer

Personal information
- Date of birth: 1855
- Place of birth: England
- Position: Defender

Senior career*
| Years | Team | Apps | (Gls) |
| 1876–1879 | Oswestry | | |

International career
| 1878–1879 | Wales | 2 | (0) |
- * Club domestic league appearances and goals

George Higham (born 1855) was a Welsh international footballer. He was part of the Wales national football team between 1878 and 1879, playing 2 matches. He played his first match on 23 March 1878 against Scotland and his last match on 18 January 1879 against England.

== See also ==
- List of Wales international footballers (alphabetical)
- List of Wales international footballers born outside Wales
