= John Evans (footballer, born 1859) =

Welsh footballer

Personal information
- Date of birth: 1871
- Place of birth: England
- Date of death: 1939 (aged 79–80)
- Position: Forward

Senior career*
| Years | Team | Apps | (Gls) |
| 1888-1891 | Oswestry Town | | |
| 1891-1893 | Chirk | | |
| 1893- | Oswestry United | | |

International career
| 1893–1894 | Wales | 3 | (0) |
- * Club domestic league appearances and goals

John Evans (1871– 1939) was a Welsh international footballer. He was part of the Wales national football team between 1893 and 1894, playing 3 matches. He played his first match on 5 April 1893 against Ireland and his last match on 12 March 1894 against England. At club level, he played for Oswestry Town, Chirk and Oswestry United.

== See also ==
- List of Wales international footballers (alphabetical)
