= Belle Vue, Shrewsbury =

Suburb of the town of Shrewsbury, Shropshire

Coordinates: 52.701°N 2.748°W

Belle Vue
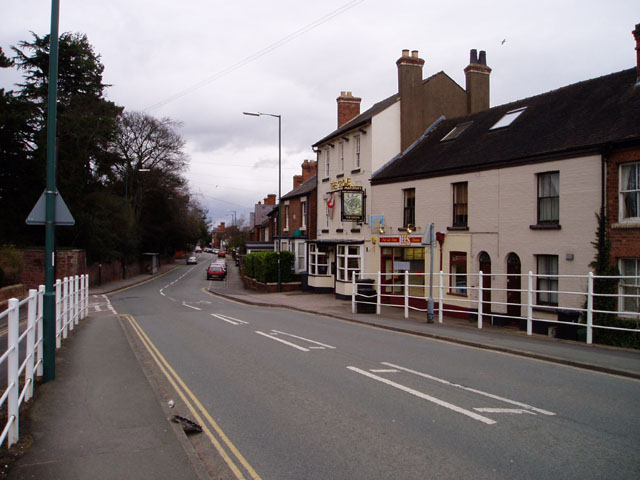
- Belle Vue Road

- Location within Shropshire
- Population: 4,550 (2011 census)
- OS grid reference: SJ494114
- Unitary authority: Shropshire
- Ceremonial county: Shropshire
- Region: West Midlands
- Country: England
- Sovereign state: United Kingdom
- Post town: Shrewsbury
- Postcode district: SY3
- Dialling code: 01743
- Police: West Mercia
- Fire: Shropshire
- Ambulance: West Midlands
- UK Parliament: Shrewsbury

Belle Vue is a suburb of the town of Shrewsbury, Shropshire. It is located about a mile south of the town centre. The population of the ward at the 2011 census was 4,550.

== History and development ==
Built up during the 19th and early 20th Centuries, it is now mainly residential. "Belle Vue Road" (the A5191, formerly the A49) runs through the middle of the area, which has many public houses such as The Grove, the Belle Vue Tavern, the Masonic Arms and the Boar's Head. It also has a selection of small shops, though many have become houses in recent decades. Also in the suburb, off the Belle Vue Road, is the Prince of Wales public house, which has its own bowling green. Streets branching off the Belle Vue Road include Greyfriars Road, Trinity Street, Havelock Road, South Hermitage and Belle Vue Gardens.

Oakley Manor, now private housing, was one of the locations of Shrewsbury and Atcham Borough Council from the 1970s to the early 2000s, before the council moved to a purpose-built Guildhall in Frankwell.

== Churches ==
Belle Vue has an Anglican parish church, dedicated to the Holy Trinity, a Methodist church and the Wellspring Apostolic Church, all on Belle Vue Road.

== Belle Vue Cemetery ==
In 1852, a 2-acre cemetery for Nonconformists in Shrewsbury was opened on Belle Vue Road but was ultimately superseded by the interdenominational, municipal General Cemetery established on Longden Road further west in 1856. The consequently disused mortuary chapel, which became a worship place for the Apostolic Church in 1929, was demolished after being partly burned down (by children) in 1943. It was on part of the cemetery that the later Wellspring Apostolic Church, whose building had been transplanted from Minsterley in 1949, was erected.

== Railways ==
The Welsh Marches Line and Cambrian Line run through the area and meet at a junction called Sutton Bridge Junction.

== Notable residents ==
- Samuel Pountney Smith, architect, remodeled The Limes as his own home, where he died in 1876, as well as building Morfe House and Kinnersley House nearby.
- William Snook, English running champion, was born in Belle Vue in 1861.
- William Henry Fletcher, Church of England clergyman, later Archdeacon of Wrexham, was curate of Holy Trinity Church 1876-78 and Vicar there 1883-88.
- Clopton Lloyd-Jones, sportsman, winning scorer in the 1880 FA Cup Final - last home at 'Montreux' in Belle Vue Gardens, where he died in 1918.
- Jack Bowdler, former Wales international footballer - last home at Oakfield House, South Hermitage, where he died in 1927. He also served as Shrewsbury Borough Councillor for the Belle Vue ward.
- Nick Bevan, rowing coach and schoolmaster, was born at The Limes Nursing Home (a later use of the house built by S P Smith, above) in 1942.

== See also ==
- Coleham
- Copthorne
