= Thomas Davies (footballer, born 1865) =

Welsh footballer (1865–1902)

Personal information
- Date of birth: 1865
- Place of birth: England
- Date of death: December 1902 (aged 36–37)
- Place of death: Flint, Wales
- Position: Forward

Senior career*
Years	Team	Apps	(Gls)
- Oswestry
- Chester

International career
1886	Wales	1	(0)
- * Club domestic league appearances and goals

Thomas Davies (1865 – December 1902) was a Welsh international footballer. He was part of the Wales national football team, playing one match on 29 March 1886 against England.

== Club career ==
At club level he played for Oswestry and Chester.

== After Football ==
After football, he managed Salmon's Vaults, Chester. He moved to Flint in 1899, where he took charge of the Royal Oak Hotel.

== Death ==
Davies died in Flint in December 1902.

== See also ==
- List of Wales international footballers (alphabetical)
