= John Morris (footballer, born 1873) =

Welsh footballer

Personal information
- Date of birth: 1873
- Place of birth: England

Senior career*
Years	Team	Apps	(Gls)
- Chirk

International career
1898	Wales	1	(0)
- * Club domestic league appearances and goals

John Morris (born 1873) was a Welsh international footballer. He was part of the Wales national football team, playing 1 match on 19 February 1898 against Ireland. At club level, he played for Chirk.

His brothers, Charlie and Robert, were also Wales internationals.

== See also ==
- List of Wales international footballers (alphabetical)
- List of Wales international footballers born outside Wales
