= Alexander Jones (footballer) =

Welsh footballer

Alexander Fletcher Jones (1854 – 16 February 1878) was a Welsh amateur footballer who played at centre-forward for Wales in their second international match against Scotland in March 1877. He was killed in a shooting accident on board a train.

== Family and education ==
Jones was born in Dumfries, Scotland, the son of William Jones of Lochmaben. He was educated at Oswestry School where he became the first pupil to be awarded a scholarship. In 1872, he went up to Brasenose College, Oxford where he was a "brilliant scholar" attaining first class honours degrees in Mathematics in 1875 and Natural Sciences in 1876.

== Football career ==
Whilst at university, Jones played "soccer" and was described in one match report as "an admirable centre player". In January 1877, he played for North Wales in a match against Sheffield in which his performance earned him a call-up to the Wales team for their international match against Scotland on 5 March 1877. The two countries had met for the first time a year earlier in Partick, Glasgow; the second international meeting between the two countries was played at the Racecourse Ground, Wrexham and was thus the first international football match played in Wales. Despite "the Welsh team (playing) more brilliantly than ever before", they lost 2–0.

He played for Oswestry FC in 1887-88. He played a match for Shrewsbury Town in January 1878.

== Later career and death ==
In May 1877, Jones became a master at Clifton College, Bristol. Whilst at the college he joined the 2nd Gloucestershire Engineer Volunteer Corps, being promoted to the rank of Second Lieutenant in January 1878.

A month later, on 16 February 1878, he was in charge of a party from the Clifton College Cadet Corps who had been practising at the firing range at Avonmouth. In the evening, the party returned by train from Avonmouth to Hotwells, close to the college. At Sea Mills, one of the cadets, Edward George Hemming (the son of an eminent barrister), was demonstrating the poor technique of another cadet by waving his Snider-Enfield rifle around when the rifle, which had not been unloaded, discharged. The bullet went through the compartment wall hitting Jones, killing him instantly.

At the coroner's inquest on 18 February, the coroner recorded a verdict of accidental death, summing up:

In a case like this one could not help feeling deep sympathy with the family of the deceased but he could not help thinking that they should extend their sympathy to the young man who had been the innocent cause of the death of this young officer.

== Memorials ==
Jones is commemorated with a memorial window at Oswestry school and a brass plaque in the ante-chapel at Clifton College:

In memory of Alexander Fletcher Jones, B.A.
A Master in this College, Who was killed by the accidental discharge of a rifle at Sea Mills, February 16th, 1878, Aged 24 years.
"Peaceable, gentle, and easy to be intreated, full of mercy and good fruits." — Jas. iii. 17.

== See also ==
- List of Wales international footballers born outside Wales
