= Seth Powell =

Welsh footballer

Personal information
- Date of birth: 1862
- Place of birth: Cerney, Wrexham, Wales
- Date of death: 3 February 1945 (aged 82–83)
- Place of death: Oswestry, England
- Position: Full-back

Youth career
- Summerhill, Wrexham

Senior career*
Years	Team	Apps	(Gls)
1884–1885	Oswestry White Stars		
1885–1890	Oswestry Town		
1890–1892	West Bromwich Albion	30	(0)
1892–1893	Burton Albion	0	(0)
- Chester
- Oswestry United

International career
1885–1892	Wales	7	(0)
- * Club domestic league appearances and goals

Seth Powell (1862 – 3 February 1945) was a Welsh footballer who played at full-back for West Bromwich Albion in the English Football League. He made seven appearances for Wales in the 1880s and 1890s.

== Football career ==
Powell was born in Cerney, near Wrexham, and played his early football in the nearby village of Summerhill. In 1883, he moved just over the border into England to become assistant schoolmaster at the Oswestry Board School.

He played for two Oswestry based football clubs; firstly with Oswestry White Stars with whom he won the Welsh Cup in 1884 and reached the final the following year. He then joined Oswestry Town where he remained until 1890.

His first international cap came on 23 March 1885 at the Racecourse Ground in Wrexham when the Welsh suffered an 8–1 defeat at the hands of Scotland, with Joseph Lindsay scoring a hat-trick. He was recalled to the side the following year for matches against Ireland and England.

Towards the end of the 1889–90 season, Powell joined West Bromwich Albion of the Football League on a wage of £2 per game plus expenses. He remained with Albion for two years during which they finished each season at or near the foot of the table. Whilst with Albion, he made a further four appearances for Wales, all of which ended in defeats.

Powell then spent a season with Burton Swifts without making any League appearances before moving to Chester, then playing in The Combination, before returning to Oswestry United.

== Later career ==
From 1900 until his retirement in 1930, Powell was the district relieving officer for the Oswestry Board of Guardians. He also served Oswestry F.C. as secretary and spent twenty years in the 2nd Volunteer Battalion of the King's Shropshire Light Infantry.

== International appearances ==
Powell made seven appearances for Wales as follows:

Date	Venue	Opponent	Result	Goals	Competition
23 March 1885	Racecourse Ground, Wrexham	Scotland	1–8	0	Friendly
27 February 1886	Racecourse Ground, Wrexham	Ireland	5–0	0	British Home Championship
29 March 1886	Racecourse Ground, Wrexham	England	1–3	0	British Home Championship
7 March 1891	Newcastle Road, Sunderland	England	1–4	0	British Home Championship
21 March 1891	Racecourse Ground, Wrexham	Scotland	3–4	0	British Home Championship
5 March 1892	Racecourse Ground, Wrexham	England	0–2	0	British Home Championship
26 March 1892	Tynecastle Park, Edinburgh	Scotland	1–6	0	British Home Championship

Powell also played in the first match against a touring Canadian XI in September 1891.

== Honours ==
Oswestry White Stars

- Welsh Cup
  - Winners: 1884
  - Finalists: 1885
