= George Glasscodine =

Welsh footballer

Personal information
- Full name: George William Glasscodine
- Date of birth: 7 August 1856
- Place of birth: Yarmouth, Isle of Wight, England
- Date of death: 15 December 1943 (aged 87)
- Place of death: Oswestry, Shropshire
- Position: Goalkeeper

Senior career*
Years	Team	Apps	(Gls)
1878–1879	Oswestry		

International career
1879	Wales	1	(0)
- * Club domestic league appearances and goals

George William Glasscodine (7 August 1856 – 15 December 1943) was a Welsh international footballer. He was part of the Wales national football team, playing 1 match on 18 January 1879 against England.

At club level, he played for Oswestry in the 1870s.

He was later a schoolmaster in Oswestry.

== See also ==
- List of Wales international footballers (alphabetical)
