= Richard Jones (footballer, born 1875) =

Welsh footballer

Personal information
- Date of birth: 1875
- Place of birth: Wales
- Position: Defender

Senior career*
Years	Team	Apps	(Gls)
- Leicester Fosse

International career
1898	Wales	1	(0)
- * Club domestic league appearances and goals

Richard Jones (born 1875) was a Welsh international footballer. He was part of the Wales national football team, playing 1 match on 19 March 1898 against Scotland. At club level, he played for Leicester Fosse.

== See also ==
- List of Wales international footballers (alphabetical)
