= Oswestry School =

Public school in Shropshire, England

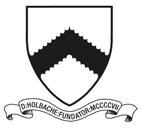

Location
- Upper Brook Street; Oswestry, Shropshire, SY11 2TL; United Kingdom; 52.85618°N 3.06338°W

Information
- Type: Public school Private boarding & day
- Motto: "Non scholae, sed vitae discimus" (English: We Learn Not For School But For Life)
- Established: 1407; 619 years ago
- Founder: David & Guinevere Holbache
- Local authority: Shropshire
- Department for Education URN: 123613 Tables
- Chairman of Governors: Peter Wilcox-Jones
- Headmaster: Peter Middleton
- Staff: 64 academic; 108 total
- Gender: Coeducational
- Age: 4 to 18
- Enrolment: 452 pupils
- Schedule: Monday-Thursday: 8:20 - 17:00; Friday: 8:20 - 16:00
- Houses: Burnaby, Donne, Oswald and Spooner
- Colour
- Publication: The Oswestrian
- Patron: The Earl of Powis
- School song: "Gaude plebs"
- Former pupils: Old Oswestrians
- Website: www.oswestryschool.com

Oswestry School is a public school (English independent boarding and day school), located in Oswestry, Shropshire, England. It was founded in 1407 as a 'free' school, being independent of the church. This gives it the distinction of being the second-oldest 'free' school in the country, between Winchester College (founded 1382) and Eton College (1440). (See also the article on early grammar schools.)

As these Renaissance schools focused heavily on subjects such as Latin grammar, Oswestry School has long been known locally as 'The Grammar School' even during the period when Oswestry had modern state grammar schools. Oswestry School should also not be confused with other secondary schools in Oswestry, such as the Marches School.

One of the school's earliest sites, dating from the 15th century, can still be seen adjacent to St Oswald's Parish Church. It is currently used as the town's visitor and information centre, incorporating a coffee shop and exhibitions.

The present-day senior school is located on Upper Brook Street and the junior school is based at Bellan House on Church Street. Bellan House Preparatory School was a completely separate institution until its amalgamation in the 1970s.

== History ==
Oswestry School was founded in 1407 by David Holbache, Member of Parliament for Shropshire and Shrewsbury, and his wife Guinevere. They are also known by their Welsh names: Dafydd ab Ieuan and Gwenhwyfar ferch Ieuan.

The school's original fee stood at 6d, though pupils who resided in Oswestry or St Martins received a discount of 2d. Later in the 15th century it took up residence in the ancient half-timbered building close to the Parish Church of St Oswald. The school later attracted the attention of Queen Elizabeth I and Oliver Cromwell; the former gave to the school an endowment of "forty shillings per annum" to help with its running, and the latter dismissed the headmaster at the time for being a "delinquent" (too "Royalist"). Early archive records show that a small percentage of the subsidised school-fees was set aside to pay for cockfighting, the pupil entertainment of that time.

Changes to the governance of the school in the mid-17th century saw a gradual transition from the lay trustees to a group of lay and clerical governors headed by the Bishop of St Asaph, who, from that time on, would appoint the Headmaster. Henceforth, these would be ordained men, a tradition which would extend into the 20th century.

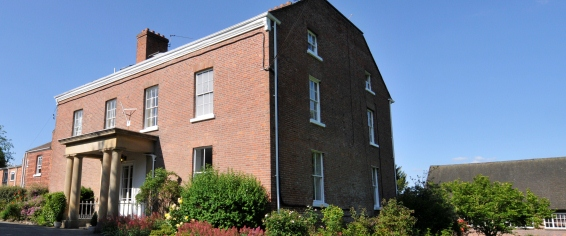
Reception & School House, which is built in the Georgian period style with Doric columns

Increasing numbers in the mid-18th century meant a move for the school to its present site on land next to the battlefield where in 642 AD King Oswald was defeated by King Penda. The Georgian building was constructed in 1776 on land leased (and later bought) from a local landed aristocrat. Its closest neighbour, the neo-Gothic Victorian chapel, built in 1863, stands looking across at St Oswald's Maes-y-llan battlefield, now the school's extensive playing fields.

A major change took place in 1972: with the admission of girls, the school became co-educational. Shortly after this, the local pre-preparatory school, Bellan House, was taken over, thereby eventually allowing the school to offer education spanning the widest possible range – now 4 years up to 18. Previously, Oswestry School solely admitted boys. Alumni of Oswestry School are referred to as Old Oswestrians.

Oswestry School celebrated its 600th anniversary in 2007.

Douglas Robb, who was headmaster from 2010 to 2014, had taught at Prince Edward School in Zimbabwe and developed links between the two schools.

== Houses ==
Oswestry School has had numerous houses over the years, including both 'competitive' and 'residential' houses. At different eras the house might have identified a pupil as day/boarder, boy/girl, or junior/senior. There are currently three boarding houses: School House, Holbache and Guinevere. Senior boarders and day pupils now mingle in the 'competitive' houses: Burnaby, Donne, Oswald and Spooner. Here are just some of the current and historical houses:

- Burnaby – Formerly a competitive house for day students, now mixed
- Donne – Formerly a competitive house for day students, now mixed
- Guinevere – A boarding house for girls situated at The Quarry
- Holbache – This started life as a senior boys' boarding house on Welsh Walls, acquired following WWII. It had previously been the old Cottage Hospital and was reputed to have retained its beds, warmth and ghosts. This building has since been redeveloped as apartments. In January 2006 it reopened on school grounds as home to sixth form boys. It has been both a residential and a competitive house.
- Oswald – Formerly a competitive house for boarders, now mixed
- School House – A boarding house for boys up to 5th form, based in the oldest part of the present school buildings, which date from 1776.
- Spooner – Formerly a competitive house for boarders, now mixed

== School song ==
In the 19th century, an Old Oswestrian wrote the school's Latin song, 'Hymnus Oswestriensium', which is informally known by its first words, 'Gaude Plebs'.

'Gaude Plebs', though written for Oswestry School, also became the official song of the nearby Moreton Hall School. Moreton Hall was founded in 1913 by the widow and daughters of Oswestry's late headmaster, John Jordan Lloyd-Williams. It primarily educated girls, who were not then eligible to attend Oswestry School.

== Notable Old Oswestrians ==
Notable pupils of the school include:

- Thomas Bray
- Frederick Gustavus Burnaby
- John Freeman Milward Dovaston
- Peter Edwards (artist)
- Peter Halliday
- Humphrey Humphreys
- Charles Ingram
- Paul Jerricho
- Alexander Jones
- Edward Lhuyd
- Philip Llewellin
- Charles Moses
- Digby Owen
- Goronwy Owen
- John Godfrey Parry-Thomas
- Richard Kyrke Penson
- Thomas Mainwaring Penson
- John Phillips
- Ivor Roberts-Jones
- Edward Bosc Sladen
- William Archibald Spooner
- Hamilton Verschoyle
- William Worthington

== List of Heads ==
(Incomplete)

- 1962-1966: Richard Sale
- 1974–1985: Frank E. Gerstenberg MA (Cantab)
- 1985–1993: I. G. Templeton MA (Edinburgh)
- 2000–2010: P. D. Stockdale BSc MEd
- 2010–2014: Douglas Robb MA (Edinburgh)
- 2014–2021: Julian Noad
- 2021-2022: Lyndsay Lang (acting)
- 2022-: Peter Middleton

== See also ==
- List of the oldest schools in the United Kingdom
