= Edward Parmelee Morris =

American classist (1853–1938)

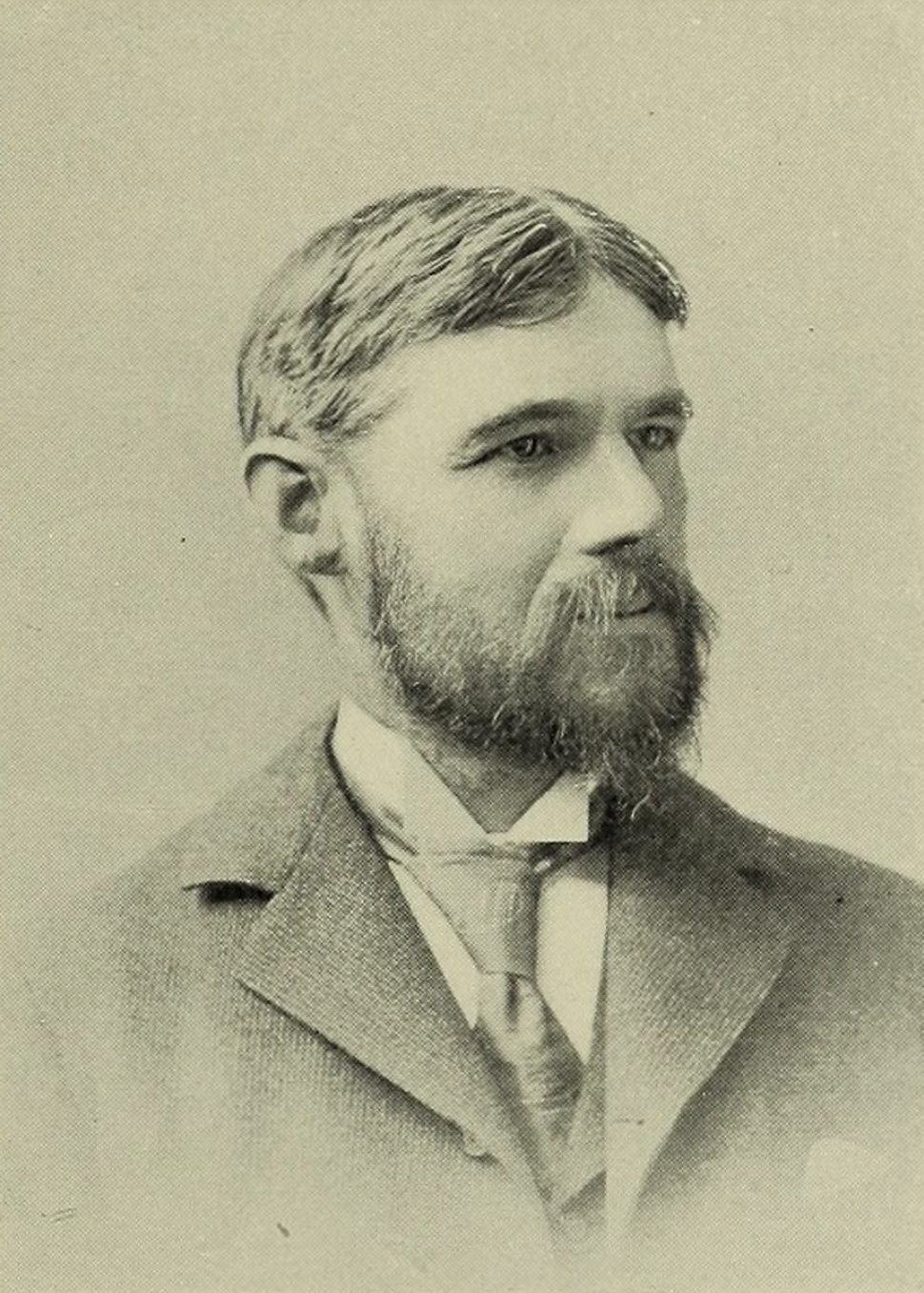
- Born: September 17, 1853; Auburn, New York, US
- Died: November 16, 1938 (aged 85); New York City, New York, US
- Education: Yale College
- Honours: L.H.D. from Williams College (1904); Litt.D. from Harvard University (1909)

Edward Parmelee Morris (September 17, 1853 – November 16, 1938) was an American classicist and academic.

== Early life ==
He was born on September 17, 1853, in Auburn, New York. He graduated from Yale College in 1874, then moved to Cincinnati where his father was living.

== Career ==
From 1876 to 1877, he taught Latin and history at Purdue College. From 1877 to 1879 he taught Latin and mathematics at Lake Forest College. From 1879 to 1884, Morris taught Greek at Drury College in Springfield, Missouri.

In 1884, he became the Massachusetts Professor of Latin Language and Literature at Williams College and was first allowed a year's leave of absence, which he spent the universities of Leipzig and Jena. He returned to Yale as a professor of the Latin language and literature in 1891. He became a significant influence on the work of Arthur Leslie Wheeler, who became Sather Professor at Princeton.

== Honors ==
Morris received an L.H.D. from Williams in 1904 and a Litt.D. from Harvard University in 1909, on the inauguration of President Abbott Lawrence Lowell.

== Personal life ==
On January 2, 1879, he married Charlotte Webster Humphrey; her father was the Reverend Z. M. Humphrey and a professor at Lane Seminary in Cincinnati. Humphrey and Morris had four children, Frances Humphrey (born 1880), Edward (born 1885), Margaret (born 1886), and Humphrey (born 1987). Edward died in infancy. Frances and Margaret both attended Bryn Mawr College. Morris died on November 16, 1938, in New York City.

== Bibliography ==
Some of his notable books are:

- The Mostellaria of Plautus; with explanatory notes (1880)
- The Study of Latin in the Preparatory Course (1886)
- On the sentence-question in Plautus and Terence (1890)
- The Captives and Trinummus of Plautus (1898)
- On principles and methods in Latin syntax (1901)
