= Oswestry White Star F.C. =

Former association football club

Oswestry White Star
- Full name: Oswestry White Star Football Club
- Nickname(s): the Stars, the Skinners
- Founded: 1880
- Dissolved: 1883
- Ground: Oakhurst Road

Oswestry White Star Football Club was a football club from Oswestry, in Shropshire

== History ==
The cearliest recorded match for the club is from January 1880, and it entered the Welsh Cup for the first time in 1881–82, going down 4–3 at eventual semi-finalist Chirk in the first round. Later in the season, the White Star played against the town's senior club, Oswestry F.C., in the Shropshire Senior Cup, going down 3–1 in a second replay.

In 1882–83, White Star was the town's only Welsh Cup entrant, as the senior club focussed on the FA Cup. Several White Star players guested for Oswestry in the English competition, but the favour was not returned in the Welsh, and although White Star beat Trefonen in the first round, it was well beaten at Berwyn Rangers in the second. By the 1883–84 season, the guest moves had become permanent, and Oswestry F.C. absorbed the White Star. The name survived briefly as that of the Oswestry second XI.

== Ground ==
The White Star ground was off the Oakhurst Road.

== Notable players ==
- R. T. Gough, goalkeeper, who was capped for the Wales national football team against Scotland in March 1883 while registered with the White Star. He was also selected for the game against Ireland the following week but did not play.
- George Farmer started with the White Star, before moving to Oswestry, and later to Everton
