= Julius Müller (footballer) =

Spanish footballer (1864–1933)

Personal information
- Full name: Julius Müller Wislicenus
- Date of birth: 1864
- Place of birth: Dresden, Germany
- Date of death: 19 August 1933 (aged 68–69)
- Place of death: Unknown
- Position: Midfielder

Senior career*
Years	Team	Apps	(Gls)
1908–1910	FC Barcelona	11	(1)
- * Club domestic league appearances and goals

Julius Müller Wislicenus (1864 – 19 August 1933) was a German footballer who played as a midfielder for FC Barcelona. Together with his brother Juan, he ran an import business in the center of Barcelona, but he is best known for being the oldest player in the club's history, having played a dozen games for the Barça team in the 1908–09 season at the age of 44, his only reported experience as a professional footballer. He was also an outstanding tennis player and athlete.

== Early life ==
Julius Müller was born in 1864 in Dresden, Germany, as the older brother of two other siblings, Hans (1866 – 5 March 1919) and Emmy. At some point in the early 1890s, he and his younger brother Hans moved to Barcelona for unclear reasons, but most likely due to work.

== Professional career ==
Whilst out in the Catalan capital, they formed a company called Hermanos Müller (Müller Brothers) and became the owners of the La Villa de Pará business, located on La Rambla, very close to the Gran Teatre del Liceu. Later, the business moved to 32 Fernando Street, corner of Avinyó. For decades, La Villa de Pará was a reference in Barcelona by specializing in imported products of different branches, from raincoats to the Macintosh house in Manchester, rubber footwear, vibrating massage machines, 'practical' tables, fiber suitcases, gymnastic equipment, vegetable oils, and products for the control and elimination of pests. The Müller Wislicenus had their names Castilianized and were known in Catalonia as Julio and Juan.

Müller was a generous man, making numerous charitable donations, and in 1906, for instance, he built two houses for his employees in La Villa de Pará. He was also involved in the Catalan civil society as he belonged to the Society for the Attraction of Foreigners, to the Board of Directors, and was consultative of the Group of residents of Fernando Street. Müller was also a member of the German Committee of the 1929 Barcelona International Exposition.

== Sporting career ==
=== Tennis ===
Müller was an outstanding tennis player, being one of the founders of the Real Tennis Club del Turó in the summer of 1903 together with the vice-consul of England in Barcelona, Jorge Smither, with the adaptation of two "courts" in the gardens of Can Lluch, in the Galvany field, behind the then old Velódromo de la Bonanova. Several footballers from FC Barcelona, the city's first-ever football club, played tennis and passed through the Turó courts, such as goalkeeper Juan de Urruela. Müller was thus a known figure within the ranks of Barcelona, being even a friend of the club's founder Joan Gamper, who had also practiced tennis in his youth.

=== Football ===
On 2 December 1908, Gamper became the president of FC Barcelona at a time of maximum crisis for the club, which was on the brink of disappearance with only 38 members left, so he began recruiting new elements, foreign and national, who were then incorporated into the team to help reactivate its situation. Despite his advanced age, the 44-year-old Müller responded to Gamper's call for help due to the lack of players in the team; along with Ernst-Alfred Thalmann, William White, and E. Büchlein. Müller thus made his debut in Spanish football in a 5–0 away victory over Sabadell at the Copa Sabadell on 6 December 1908.

In the chronicles of the time, his first name is not detailed. At most DJ Müller is specified, which is how he is named on Barcelona's official website. The 'D' is added to give the distinction of Don to a "sportsman", common in those times, while the 'J' should refer to Julio, although it could also be to refer to his brother, who was known in Catalonia as Juan. According to the chronicle of that time, Müller was a "determined and hardworking half-back".

Müller finished the 1908–09 season with nine appearances, four in friendly matches and five in competitive official matches, all of which in the Catalan championship, the last of which on a 4–0 victory over AC Galeno on 28 March 1909, and in doing so at the age of 44 or 45 years, he not only became the oldest Barça player to play in an official competition, but also oldest-ever player to feature in a competitive top-tier official match in Spanish football, a record that was later broken by Harry Lowe in the 1934–35 La Liga, aged 48. Barça went on to win the 1908–09 Catalan championship.

Exactly one year later, on 28 March 1910, Müller played his last match for Barcelona, a friendly against Club Español de Madrid, which was also his only appearance in the 1909–10 season, scoring once in a 3–3 draw, thus becoming, at the age of 45 or 46 years, in both the oldest scorer and the oldest player in the club's history, official or otherwise, a record that he still holds, and by a large margin, since his closest pursuers are Dani Alves at 38, Lilian Thuram at 36, and then Robert Lewandowski at 35.

== Personal life ==
Müller formed a family with Blanca Empaytaz, the daughter of a pastor who came from Geneva and served in the Evangelical Church of Barcelona. The couple had four children: Adolfo, Elsa (who practiced swimming), Eduvigis, and Teodoro. The latter also stood out in tennis and took part in motorcycle races, and then, years later, the Barça entity made a concession with Teodoro for the exclusive sale of chewing gum in the Camp de Les Corts. He became a widower in September 1930.

His brother married Elisabeth Thyssen, with whom he had six children (Juana, Walter, Lissy, Hellmut, Alfredo, and Dorita).

== Death ==
Müller died in the Vallfogona de Riucorb on 19 August 1933, where he was undergoing treatment, the victim of a heart attack, at the age of 69.

== Honours ==
Barcelona

- Catalan championship: 1909
