= Thomas Burnett (footballer) =

Welsh footballer

Personal information
- Date of birth: 1852
- Place of birth: England
- Position: Goalkeeper

Senior career*
| Years | Team | Apps | (Gls) |
| 1877 | Ruabon | | |

International career
| 1877 | Wales | 1 | (0) |
- * Club domestic league appearances and goals

Thomas Burnett (born 1852) was a Welsh international footballer. He was part of the Wales national football team, playing 1 match on 5 March 1877 against Scotland.

== See also ==
- List of Wales international footballers (alphabetical)
