= Edward James Morris =

World War II flying ace

- Born: 6 April 1915
- Died: 18 January 1999 (aged 83)
- Military career
- Branch: Royal Air Force
- Service years: 1937 - 1968
- Rank: Air Commodore
- Commands: AOC Air Cadets; RAF Wattisham; RAF Old Sarum
- Awards: Order of the Bath; Commander of the Most Excellent Order of the British Empire; Distinguished Service Order; Distinguished Flying Cross; Distinguished Flying Cross (United States)

Edward James Morris CB CBE DSO DFC (6 April 1915 - 18 Jan 1999) was a World War II flying ace.

Born in the Transvaal, he want to school at Michaelhouse. After school he joined the Royal Air Force on short term commission in June 1937. After completing training in May 1938 he was posted to the Parachute Test Flight, where he stayed until January 1939. He then joined 79 Squadron at Biggin Hill. He was wounded in action in August 1940 and after recuperating was sent to the Middle East in May 1941 to join 238 Squadron. In September 1941 he took command of 250 Squadron flying the Curtiss Tomahawk.

His next posting was to Desert Air Force Headquarters in March 1942. Later that year he was appointed Chief Instructor at No. 71 Operational Training Unit RAF before becoming Wing Leader of No. 251 Wing RAF of the Desert Air Force in late 1943.

At the end of 1944 he was posted to Mediterranean Allied Air Forces Headquarters.

He obtained a permanent commission in May 1945 and was sent to the RAF Staff College. He was promoted to Wing Commander in 1947.

In 1950 he took command of RAF Old Sarum before attending the College of Air Warfare in 1953. After the course he went on an exchange with the United States Air Force at Eglin Air Force Base. He returned to the UK in 1956 and was promoted Group Captain and posted to 12 Group. In 1958 he took command of RAF Wattisham before being posted as Air Commodore Operations at Fighter Command HQ. He was promoted to Air Commodore in 1962 and posted as Director of Air Defence and Overseas Operations at the Air Ministry. He was Chief of Staff at Middle East Command from 1964 to 1966. His final posting was AOC Air Cadets until he retired in August 1968.

== Retirement ==
He returned to South Africa and moved to Natal as the Personnel Manager of sugar estates. He then went to Swaziland to construct a sugar estate before returning to start his own farm in Natal.
