= Edward Morris (cricketer) =

English cricketer

Personal information
- Full name: Edward Silvester Morris
- Born: 6 April 1849; Bedminster, Somerset, England
- Died: 14 November 1928 (aged 79); Rochdale, Lancashire, England
- Batting: Unknown
- Bowling: Unknown

Domestic team information
- Years: Team
- 1870: Gloucestershire

Career statistics
Competition	First-class
Matches	2
Runs scored	30
Batting average	15.00
100s/50s	–/–
Top score	17
Balls bowled	–
Wickets	–
Bowling average	–
5 wickets in innings	–
10 wickets in match	–
Best bowling	–
Catches/stumpings	–/–
- Source: Cricinfo, 25 September 2011

Edward Silvester Morris (6 April 1849 – 14 November 1928) was an English cricketer. Morris' batting and bowling styles are unknown. He was born in Bedminster, Somerset.

Morris made two first-class appearances for Gloucestershire in 1870. The first of these came against Surrey at The Oval. In this match he batted once, scoring 17 runs before being dismissed by George Griffith. The second of these came against the Marylebone Cricket Club at Lord's. In this match, he scored 13 runs in Gloucestershire's only innings before being dismissed by Alfred Shaw.

Morris died in Rochdale, Lancashire on 14 November 1928.
