= William White (footballer) =

Bermudan footballer

Personal information
- Full name: William Kyree Marcus White
- Date of birth: 10 January 1995 (age 31)
- Place of birth: Hamilton, Bermuda
- Height: 6 ft 4 in (1.93 m)
- Position: Midfielder

College career
| Years | Team | Apps | (Gls) |
| 2013 | Sewanee Tigers | 16 | (3) |
| 2014–2016 | UAB Blazers | 24 | (0) |

Senior career*
| Years | Team | Apps | (Gls) |
| 2018 | Närpes Kraft | 17 | (1) |
| 2019 | Detroit City | | |

International career^{‡}
| 2010 | Bermuda U17 | 1 | (0) |
| 2015– | Bermuda | 6 | (0) |
- * Club domestic league appearances and goals as of 15:44, 30 January 2021 (UTC) ‡ National team caps and goals as of 15:44, 6 June 2020 (UTC)

William Kyree Marcus White (born 10 January 1995) is a Bermudan footballer who plays as a midfielder.

== Career statistics ==
=== Club ===
As of 6 June 2020.

| Club | Season | League | | | Cup | | Continental | | Other | | Total | |
| Club | Season | Division | Apps | Goals | Apps | Goals | Apps | Goals | Apps | Goals | Apps | Goals |
|---|---|---|---|---|---|---|---|---|---|---|---|---|
| Närpes Kraft | 2018 | Kakkonen | 17 | 1 | 0 | 0 | – | | 0 | 0 | 17 | 1 |
| Career total | | | 17 | 1 | 0 | 0 | 0 | 0 | 0 | 0 | 17 | 1 |

=== International ===
As of matches played 6 June 2020.

| National team | Year | Apps | Goals |
|---|---|---|---|
| Bermuda | 2015 | 1 | 0 |
| Bermuda | 2016 | 1 | 0 |
| Bermuda | 2017 | 1 | 0 |
| Bermuda | 2018 | 1 | 0 |
| Bermuda | 2019 | 2 | 0 |
| Bermuda | 2020 | 0 | 0 |
| Total | | 6 | 0 |
