= Robert Morris (Welsh footballer) =

Welsh footballer (1875–1926)

Personal information
- Date of birth: 1875
- Place of birth: Oswestry, England
- Date of death: 23 September 1926 (50–51)
- Place of death: Chirk, Wales
- Position: Centre half

Senior career*
| Years | Team | Apps | (Gls) |
| 1893-1902 | Chirk | | |
| 1902-1907 | Shrewsbury Town | | |
| 1907-1909 | Chirk | | |

International career
| 1900–1903 | Wales | 6 | (0) |
- * Club domestic league appearances and goals

Robert Morris (1875 – 23 September 1926) was a Welsh international footballer. He was part of the Wales national football team between 1900 and 1903, playing 6 matches. He played his first match on 24 February 1900 against Ireland and his last match on 28 March 1903 against Ireland.

His brothers, Charlie and John, were also Wales internationals.

== See also ==
- List of Wales international footballers (alphabetical)
