= Digby Owen =

Welsh footballer

Personal information
- Full name: William Digby Owen
- Date of birth: 3rd qtr 1857
- Place of birth: Oswestry, Shropshire, England
- Date of death: 2 June 1901 (aged 43)
- Place of death: Oswestry, Shropshire, England
- Position: Forward

Senior career*
Years	Team	Apps	(Gls)
1876–1880	Oswestry		

International career
1879	Wales	1	(0)
- * Club domestic league appearances and goals

William Digby Owen (1857 – 2 June 1901) was a Welsh amateur footballer who played as a forward in the first international match between Wales and England in January 1879. He played his club football for Oswestry, for whom he also played cricket. He later became a private tutor and died of pneumonia in his early forties.

== Education ==
Owen was born in Oswestry, a few miles from the Welsh border within Shropshire, in the third quarter (i.e. July to September) of 1857, son of George Owen (1827-1901), and educated at Oswestry School. He attended Trinity College, Oxford from where he graduated with a B.A. degree in 1878.

He was selected to represent Oxford University against Cambridge at football but was unable to play because of illness, thus missing out on a "blue".

== Football career ==
Described as "a fine athlete and a noted exponent of the dribbling game", Owen first played football for Oswestry in 1876, but his appearances were rather intermittent, as they were interrupted by his academic studies.

In January 1879, he was one of nine players from Oswestry (including three who were spending a season with Oswestry as their own club, Druids, was temporarily without a ground) who was selected to represent Wales against England in the first international match between the two countries. The match was played at the Kennington Oval on 18 January and was shortened to two halves of only 30 minutes each because of the heavy snowfall. The match report in The Times said "In spite of the fact that a thick layer of snow covered Kennington-oval on Saturday, the match between England and Wales, announced for that day, was played." England scored twice in the first half, with William Davies scoring the Wales reply in the 47th minute.

Owen also represented North Wales against Sheffield in 1877 and against Lancashire in 1879, and Shropshire against Staffordshire in 1879.

== Later career ==
On leaving Oxford, Owen settled back in Oswestry where he became a private tutor. His football career was over by 1880 but he continued to play cricket for Oswestry having played for Shropshire in 1877 and 1878.

Owen died of pneumonia in June 1901, in his early forties.
