= William Davies (footballer, born 1854) =

Welsh footballer

William Henry Davies
Personal information
- Date of birth: January/March 1854
- Place of birth: Oswestry, Shropshire, England
- Date of death: 14 November 1916 (aged 62)
- Place of death: Oswestry, England

Senior career*
Years	Team	Apps	(Gls)
????–1875	Oswestry St Oswalds		
1875–???	Oswestry		

International career
1876–1880	Wales	4	(1)
- * Club domestic league appearances and goals

William Henry Davies (January/March 1854 – 14 November 1916) was a Welsh amateur footballer who made four appearances for the Wales national football team in the 1870s and 1880s, and scored his country's first international goal.

== Career outside football ==
Davies was born, and lived most of his life, at Oswestry, just across the border in Shropshire, England. On leaving school, Davies started working in the office of the county court registrar, before obtaining employment with a firm of solicitors as an accounts clerk. He later became the part-time Registrar of Births and Deaths in Oswestry.

He was a strong churchman and was active in the temperance movement for many years.

Davies was also a keen cricketer and played for Shropshire, before the formation of the modern county club, between 1882 and 1893, making 39 appearances for the county, playing as a wicket-keeper, while playing at club level for Whitchurch.

He died in Oswestry on 14 November 1916, aged 62.

== Football career ==
Davies was a pioneer of football in Oswestry, and first played for Oswestry St Oswalds, the first football club established in the town, becoming team captain. On 4 September 1875, he was present at the meeting held at Oswestry Cricket Club to form an association football club to represent the town. This was the birth of Oswestry F.C., later to evolve as Oswestry Town.

In February 1876, he took part in trials organised by Llewelyn Kenrick to select Welsh players to represent their country in a match against Scotland. The match was played at Hamilton Crescent, Partick, the home of the West of Scotland Cricket Club on 25 March 1876, with Davies playing at outside-right in a 2–2–6 formation. The Welsh were well defeated, conceding four goals without reply.

Described as "equally at home as a forward or half back (who) could pass the ball accurately and possessed good dribbling skills", Davies was sometimes criticised for selfishness, although "his presence as a forward always meant danger for opposing defences."

On 18 January 1879, he was one of eight Oswestry based players to be selected for the first international match between Wales and England, including three who were spending a season with Oswestry as their own club, Druids, was temporarily without a ground. The match was played at the Kennington Oval, London in atrocious weather conditions with the team captains agreeing to play only 30 minutes in each half. The match report in The Times said "In spite of the fact that a thick layer of snow covered Kennington-oval on Saturday, the match between England and Wales, announced for that day, was played." England scored twice in the first half, with Davies scoring the Wales reply in the 47th minute; Davies, "with his usual brilliant dash landed the first goal for Wales, amidst tremendous cheering". According to Philip Gibbons, "England were surprised by the level of skill shown by the Welsh team."

In the 1883–84 season, Davies helped Oswestry reach the final of the Welsh Cup where they defeated Druids 1–0 in a replay.

== International appearances ==
Davies made four appearances for Wales in official international matches, as follows:

Date	Venue	Opponent	Result	Goals	Competition
25 March 1876	West of Scotland Cricket Ground, Partick	Scotland	0–4	0	Friendly
5 March 1877	Racecourse Ground, Wrexham	Scotland	0–2	0	Friendly
18 January 1879	Kennington Oval, London	England	1–2	1	Friendly
15 March 1880	Racecourse Ground, Wrexham	England	2–3	0	Friendly

== Honours ==
Oswestry FC

- Welsh Cup winners: 1884
