= Oswestry Cricket Club =

- Full name: Oswestry Cricket Club
- Founded: 1855
- Ground: The Stonehouse Oval; Morda Road; Oswestry; Shropshire; England
- President: Steve Adams
- Manager: Alex Davidson
- League: Shropshire County Cricket League
- Website: https://oswestrycricketclub.co.uk/

Oswestry Cricket Club /ˈɒswɛstri/ is an amateur cricket club based in Oswestry, Shropshire. The club was formed in 1855 and celebrated its 150th anniversary in 2005 with a fixture against Marylebone Cricket Club (MCC). Oswestry Cricket Club has four teams which represent them on Saturdays during the cricket season, a "friendly" team that plays on Sundays, and the "Aardvarks" team which plays midweek fixtures. Its home venue is Morda Road in Oswestry. The club has a number of junior teams from which the bulk of its players are traditionally drawn. The club is associated with "The Bedouins Cricket Club" who also play at Morda Road.

Oswestry Cricket Club also has its own successful football team which was formed in 1993. Recent successes have included winning both the Wem Sunday League and League Cup in the 2009/10 season.

== History ==
Until the Second World War, the club's ground was at Victoria Road, Oswestry. The ground was shared with Oswestry Town Football Club. During the first two decades following the war, many of Oswestry’s friendly matches were against Welsh opposition, and games with Welshpool, Newtown and Brymbo were particularly keenly fought.

Football took precedence at the ground after the war, and in 1947 the club moved to its present site in Morda Road. The pavilion was the former canteen of the Coventry Climax factory, which was initially sited in Victoria Road and transported to Morda Road. It served on that site as the club's pavilion until a major redevelopment of facilities in 2005–06. During the winter of 2005, a £350,000 pavilion was built at Morda Road.

The club was one of twelve founder members of the Shropshire Cricket League in 1970. Two years later Oswestry shared the Division One title with Shifnal. Having won the Shropshire Premier Cricket League in 2007 the club was elevated to Division 3 of the Birmingham & District Cricket League for the 2008 season. They were immediately relegated, but regained Birmingham League status in 2009 by securing the Shropshire Premier Cricket League title for a second time.

== Notable players ==
This list is compiled of cricketers who have played representative cricket before, during or after their time at Oswestry, therefore making them notable to the club, county and international cricket scene.

England

- (England) Andy Lloyd
- (England) Joe Clarke

Canada

- (Canada) John Davison

Andy Lloyd went on to play for and be captain of Warwickshire and also represented England. John Davison, Canadian-born but raised in Australia, was the club's overseas player in 1993. Several Oswestry players have represented Shropshire at minor counties level, including Digby Owen, John Hare, Ramesh Sethi, Dave Vart, Ben Platt, Jim Phillips, Mark Robinson, Alex Huxley, Joe Clarke, Jonathan Miles, Joseph Carrasco, Robbie Clarke, Charlie Morris and most recently Matt Gregson.

== First XI Honours ==
- Shropshire Cricket League Division 1 – Champions 1972
- Shropshire Premier League Division One Championships – Champions 2007, 2009
- Shrewsbury Chronicle Knockout Cup – Champions 2004 (runners up 1989, 1990, 2005)
- BDPCL Division 3 Champions 2012
- BDPCL Division 2 Champions 2013
- BDPCL Division 2 Champions 2017
