= Charlie Morris (footballer) =

Wales international footballer

Personal information
- Full name: Charles Richard Morris
- Date of birth: 29 August 1880
- Place of birth: Oswestry, Shropshire, England
- Date of death: 18 January 1952 (aged 71)
- Place of death: Chirk, Denbighshire, Wales
- Position: Defender

Senior career*
Years	Team	Apps	(Gls)
1899–1900	Chirk		
1900–1910	Derby County	277	(1)
1910–1911	Huddersfield Town	16	(0)
1911–1912	Wrexham		
1912–1913	Chirk		

International career
1900–1911	Wales	27	(0)
- * Club domestic league appearances and goals

Charles Richard Morris (29 August 1880 – 18 January 1952) was a professional footballer, who played for Derby County and Huddersfield Town as a full back. He also played international football for Wales on 27 occasions. He also represented Chirk and Wrexham in the Welsh league.

== Family ==
He was born in Oswestry. His brothers, Jack and Robert, were also Wales internationals.
