= List of Wales international footballers =

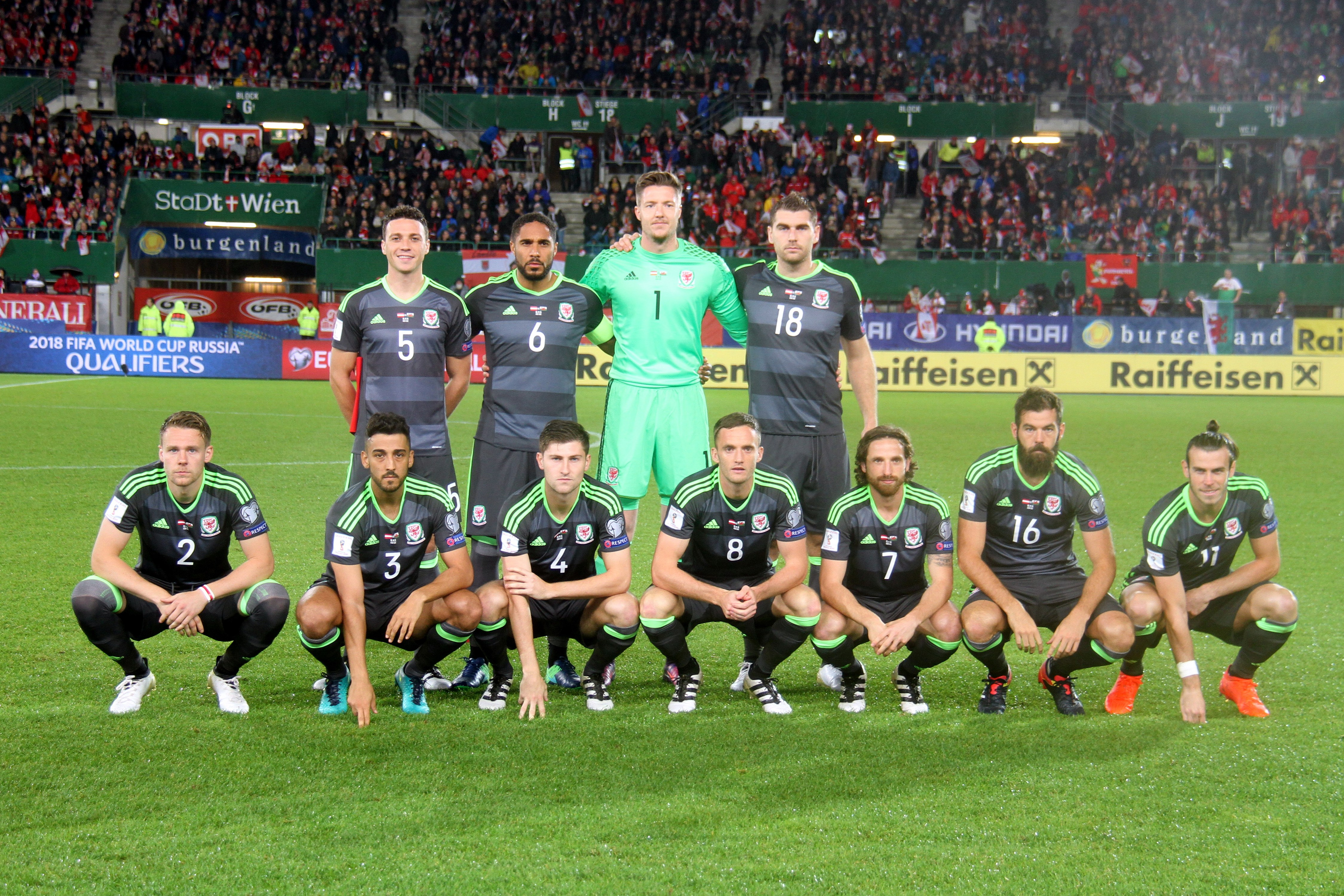
The Wales national football team pose for a team photo prior to a match in 2016.

The Wales national football team has represented Wales in international association football since 1876, making it the third oldest international football team. They played their first official match on 25 March 1876, four years after England and Scotland played the first ever international football match. They are governed by the Football Association of Wales and compete as a member of the Union of European Football Associations (UEFA), which predominantly encompasses the countries of Europe. As of October 2023, Wales have played 706 international matches since their debut, winning 225, drawing 156 and losing 325. They have played over 100 fixtures against England and Scotland, regularly competing against both in the British Home Championship between 1884 and 1984, winning the competition on twelve occasions. In global and continental competitions, Wales have qualified for two FIFA World Cups in 1958 and 2022, reaching the quarter-finals in the former, and two UEFA European Championships in 2016 and 2020 in their history, reaching the semi-finals in the former.

Wales were the last side from the Home Nations without a player reaching 100 caps. Gareth Bale is Wales most capped player with 111 caps. Chris Gunter became the first player to earn 100 Wales caps, reaching the tally on 27 March 2021 in a friendly against Mexico. Players who reach 50 appearances for Wales are awarded a golden cap. Bale also holds the record for the most goals scored for Wales having scored 41 goals, overtaking Ian Rush's record in March 2018.

Billy Meredith was the first Welsh player to reach 25 caps and went on to accumulate 48 caps in his career and score eleven goals, both Welsh records at the time. His appearance record stood for 42 years until it was beaten by Ivor Allchurch in 1962, who finished his career with 68 caps. Defender Joey Jones set a new record in the 1980s, amassing 72 caps, before his record was overtaken by Peter Nicholas in 1991 by a single cap. On 23 May 1994, Neville Southall played in a 2–1 victory over Estonia to earn his 74th cap and overtake Nicholas, eventually gaining 92 caps before retiring. Gunter surpassed Southall's cap record on 20 November 2018 against Albania, before he himself was overtaken when Bale made his 110th Wales appearance in their 2022 FIFA World Cup Group B match against Iran on 25 November 2022.

== List of players ==
	Key
*	Still active for the national team (Note: Players who are still active for the national team are players who have not retired from international football and are, subsequently, eligible to be called up.)
GK	Goalkeeper
DF	Defender
MF	Midfielder
FW	Forward

Caps and goals sourced from:

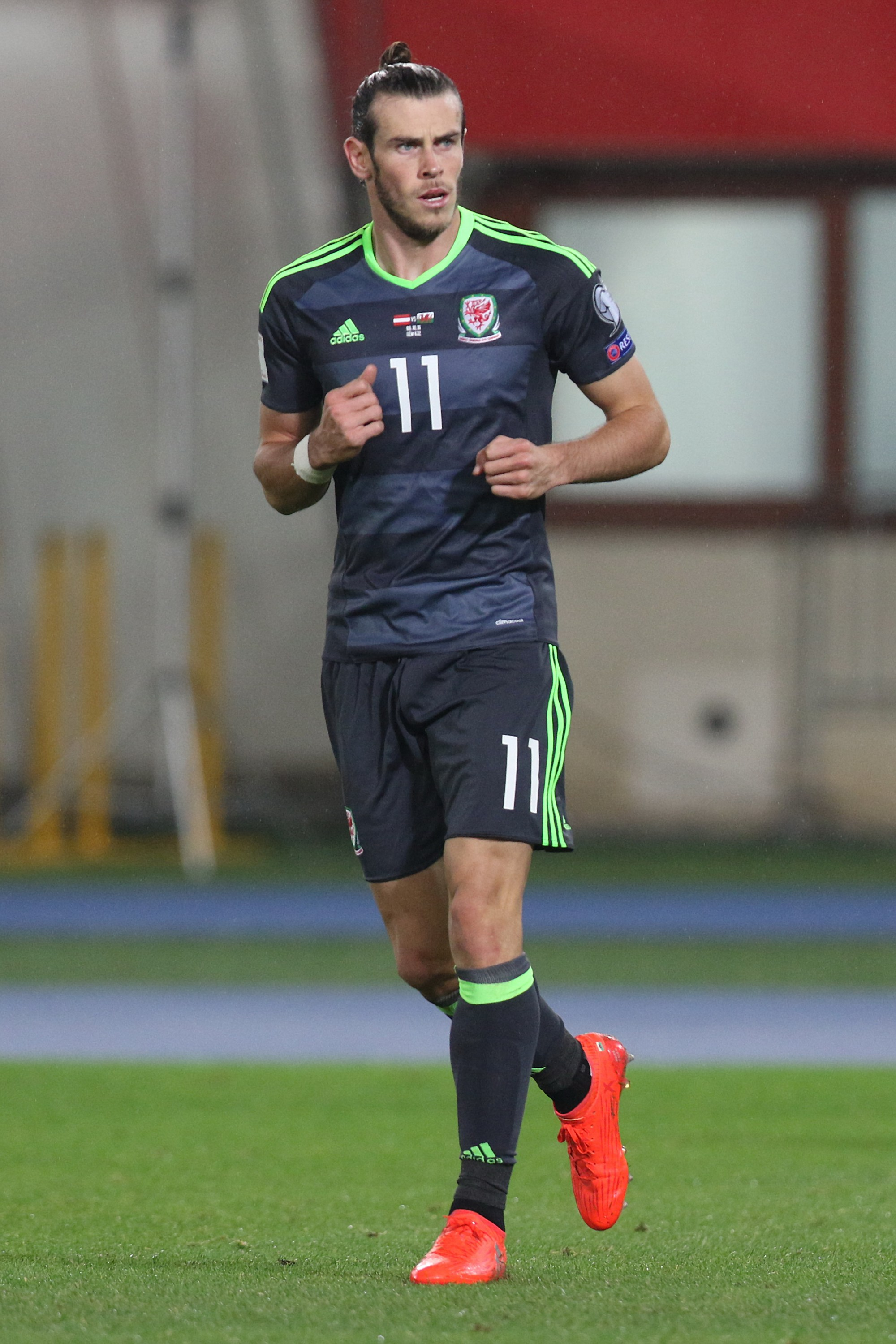
Gareth Bale is Wales' top goalscorer of all-time with 41 goals and record cap holder.

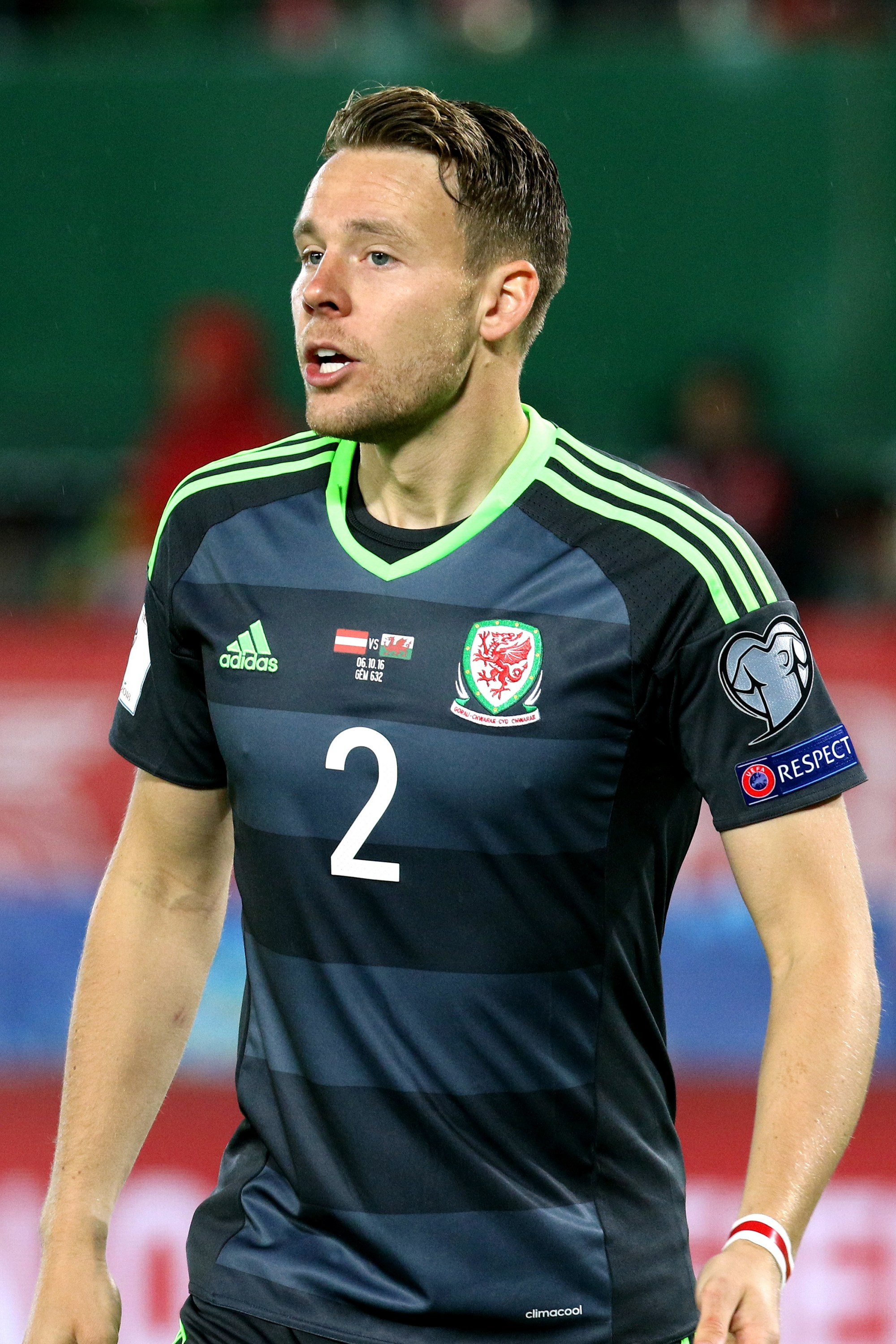
Chris Gunter was the first player to attain 100 caps for Wales.

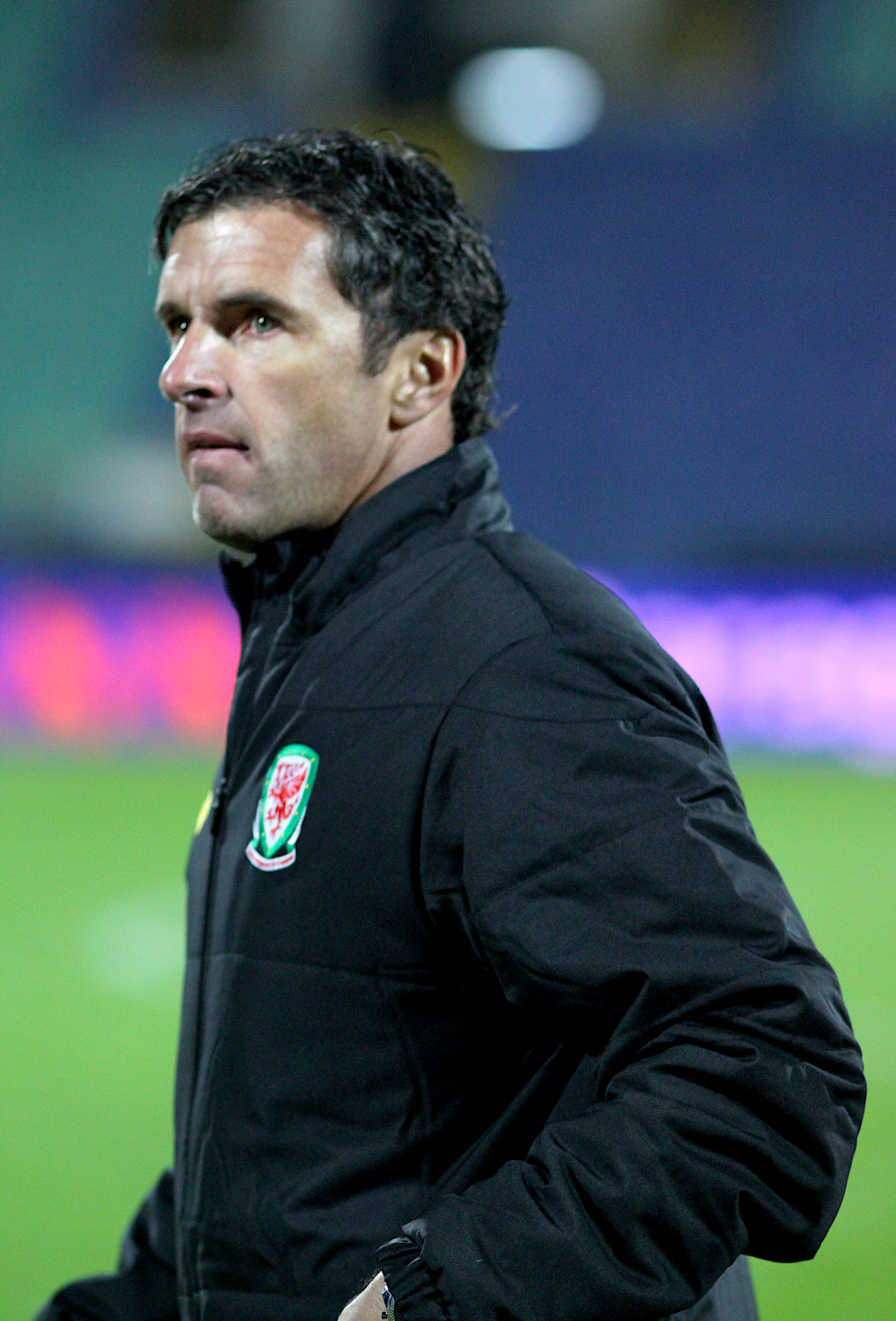
Gary Speed gained 85 caps for Wales and managed the side between 2010 and 2011.

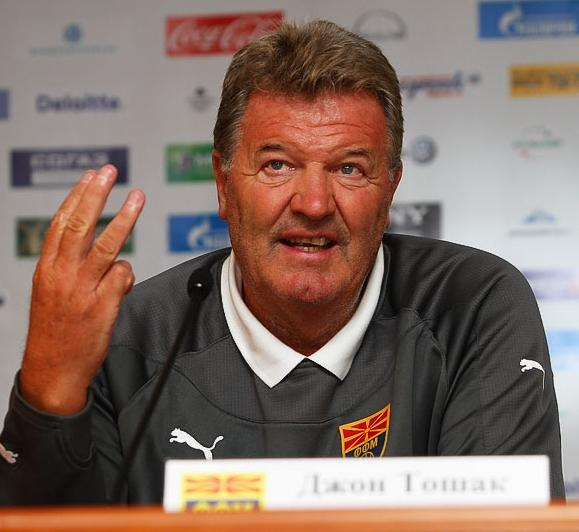
John Toshack gained 40 caps for Wales and managed the side for a single match in 1994 and between 2004 and 2010.

As of 17 November 2026

Wales national team footballers with at least 25 appearances
#	Name	Position	National team career	Caps	Goals	Other roles
1	Gareth Bale	FW	2006–2022	111	41	
2=	Chris Gunter	DF	2007–2022	109	0	
2=	Wayne Hennessey	GK	2007–2023	109	0	
4	Ben Davies*	DF	2012–2026	106	3	
5	Neville Southall	GK	1982–1997	92	0	
6=	Aaron Ramsey	MF	2008–2024	86	21	
6=	Ashley Williams	DF	2008–2019	86	2	
8	Gary Speed	MF	1990–2004	85	7	Manager
9	Craig Bellamy	FW	1998–2013	78	19	Manager
10=	Joe Allen	MF	2009–2025	77	2	
10=	Joe Ledley	MF	2006–2018	77	4	
12	Dean Saunders	FW	1986–2001	75	22	
13=	Peter Nicholas	MF	1979–1991	73	2	
13=	Ian Rush	FW	1980–1996	73	28	
15=	Mark Hughes	FW	1984–1999	72	16	Manager
15=	Joey Jones	DF	1975–1986	72	1	
17	Harry Wilson*	MF	2013–2026	71	17	
18	Daniel James*	MF	2018–2026	70	11	
19=	Ivor Allchurch	FW	1950–1966	68	23	
19=	Ethan Ampadu*	MF	2017–2026	68	0	
21	Connor Roberts*	DF	2018–2026	67	3	
22	Brian Flynn	MF	1974–1984	66	7	Manager (Note: Flynn was appointed caretaker manager for two matches in 2010.)
23	Andy Melville	DF	1989–2004	65	3	
24=	Ryan Giggs	MF	1991–2007	64	12	Manager
24=	Sam Vokes	FW	2008–2019	64	11	
24=	Joe Rodon*	DF	2019–2026	64	2	
27=	David Phillips	MF	1984–1996	62	2	
27=	Neco Williams*	DF	2020–2026	62	5	
29=	Barry Horne	MF	1987–1997	59	2	
29=	Cliff Jones	MF	1954–1969	59	16	
29=	Kevin Ratcliffe	DF	1980–1993	59	0	
29=	Terry Yorath	MF	1969–1981	59	2	Manager
33=	Simon Davies	MF	2001–2010	58	6	
33=	Robert Earnshaw	FW	2002–2012	58	16	
33=	Leighton Phillips	DF	1971–1981	58	0	
36=	Chris Mepham*	DF	2018–2026	57	0	
36=	Kieffer Moore*	FW	2019–2026	57	15	
38=	Leighton James	MF	1971–1988	54	10	
38=	Mark Pembridge	MF	1991–2003	54	6	
40=	Dai Davies	GK	1975–1982	52	0	
40=	Sam Ricketts	DF	2005–2014	52	0	
40=	Carl Robinson	MF	1999–2009	52	1	
43=	James Collins	DF	2004–2016	51	3	
43=	John Hartson	FW	1995–2005	51	14	
43=	Brennan Johnson*	FW	2020–2026	51	7	
43=	John Mahoney	MF	1967–1983	51	1	
43=	Mickey Thomas	MF	1977–1986	51	4	
48=	Paul Jones	GK	1997–2006	50	0	
48=	Andy King	MF	2009–2018	50	2	
48=	Rod Thomas	MF	1967–1977	50	0	
48=	Danny Ward*	GK	2016–2026	50	0	
52	Danny Gabbidon	DF	2002–2014	49	0	
53=	David Brooks*	FW	2017–2026	48	9	
53=	Billy Meredith	FW	1895–1920	48	11	
55	Robbie James	MF	1979–1988	47	7	
56	Hal Robson-Kanu	FW	2010–2021	46	5	
57	Mike England	DF	1962–1975	44	4	Manager
58=	David Edwards	MF	2007–2017	43	3	
58=	Neil Taylor	DF	2010–2019	43	1	
58=	Stuart Williams	DF	1954–1965	43	0	
61	David Vaughan	MF	2003–2016	42	1	
62=	Mark Bowen	DF	1986–1997	41	3	
62=	Jack Kelsey	GK	1954–1962	41	0	
62=	Rob Page	DF	1999–2005	41	0	Manager
62=	Alf Sherwood	DF	1947–1957	41	0	
66=	Peter Rodrigues	DF	1965–1974	40	0	
66=	John Toshack	FW	1969–1980	40	13	Manager
68=	Mark Aizlewood	DF	1986–1995	39	0	
68=	Clayton Blackmore	MF	1985–1997	39	1	
68=	Terry Hennessey	DF	1962–1973	39	0	
68=	Ronnie Rees	MF	1965–1972	39	3	
68=	Robbie Savage	MF	1995–2004	39	2	
73=	John Charles	FW	1950–1965	38	15	
73=	Simon Church	FW	2009–2016	38	3	
73=	Trevor Ford	FW	1947–1957	38	23	
76=	Joe Morrell	MF	2019–2023	37	0	
76=	Gary Sprake	GK	1964–1975	37	0	
76=	Kit Symons	DF	1992–2004	37	2	
79=	Mark Delaney	DF	1999–2006	36	0	
79=	Carl Fletcher	MF	2004–2009	36	1	
81=	James Chester	DF	2014–2018	35	0	
81=	Alan Curtis	MF	1976–1987	35	6	
83=	Wyn Davies	FW	1964–1974	34	6	
83=	Mel Hopkins	DF	1956–1963	34	0	
83=	Jason Koumas	MF	2001–2009	34	10	
83=	Lewin Nyatanga	DF	2006–2011	34	0	
87=	Roy Paul	DF	1949–1956	33	1	
87=	Jonny Williams	MF	2013–2022	33	2	
89=	Ron Burgess	MF	1947–1954	32	1	Manager (Note: Burgess was appointed caretaker manager for a single match in 1965.)
89=	Chris Coleman	DF	1992–2002	32	4	Manager
89=	Fred Keenor	DF	1920–1932	32	2	
89=	Sorba Thomas*	FW	2021–2026	32	3	
89=	Roy Vernon	FW	1957–1968	32	8	
94=	Mel Charles	DF	1955–1963	31	6	
94=	Kenny Jackett	MF	1983–1988	31	0	
96=	Barrie Hole	MF	1963–1971	30	0	
96=	Jordan James*	MF	2023–2026	30	1	
96=	Terry Medwin	FW	1953–1963	30	6	
96=	John Robinson	MF	1995–2002	30	3	
100=	Nathan Blake	FW	1994–2003	29	4	
100=	Andrew Crofts	MF	2005–2017	29	0	
100=	Ron Davies	FW	1964–1974	29	8	
100=	Gil Reece	MF	1965–1975	29	2	
104	Malcolm Page	DF	1971–1979	28	0	
105=	Alan Durban	FW	1966–1972	27	2	
105=	Billy Lewis	FW	1885–1898	27	8	
105=	Charlie Morris	DF	1900–1911	27	0	
108	Graham Williams	DF	1960–1968	26	1	
109	Paul Price	DF	1980–1984	25	1	
