= Ireland national football team results (1882–1899) =

- Win Draw Loss

This is a list of the Ireland national football team results from 1882 to 1899. From 1882 to 1921 all of Ireland was represented by a single side, the Ireland national football team, organised by the Irish Football Association (IFA).

In 1920 Ireland was partitioned into Northern Ireland and Southern Ireland. In 1922, The south of Ireland gained independence as the Irish Free State, later to become Republic of Ireland. Amid these political upheavals, a rival football association, the Football Association of Ireland (the F.A.I.), emerged in Dublin in 1921 and organised a separate league and later a national team. In 1923, during a period when the home nations had dis-affiliated from the governing body, the FAI was recognised by FIFA as the governing body of the Irish Free State on the condition that it changed its name to the Football Association of the Irish Free State. At the same time, the IFA continued to organise its national team on an all-Ireland basis, regularly calling up Free State players. During this era at least one Northerner, Harry Chatton, also played for the Irish Free State and from 1936, the FAI began to organise their own all–Ireland team. Both teams now competed as Ireland and during this era at least 39 dual internationals were selected to represent both teams. Between 1928 and 1946 the IFA were not affiliated to FIFA and the two Ireland teams co-existed, never competing in the same competition.

In April 1951, FIFA decreed that the IFA team could not select "citizens of Eire". An exception was for British Home Championship games, as a 1923 IFAB agreement at Liverpool prevented FIFA intervention in relations between the four Home Nations. However, the exception would only apply "if the F.A. of Ireland do not object", and was never availed of.

At FIFA's 1953 congress, its Rule 3 was amended so that an international team must use "that title ... recognised politically and geographically of the countries or territories". The FAI initially claimed Rule 3 gave them the right to the name Ireland (see names of the Irish state), but FIFA subsequently ruled neither team could be referred to as Ireland, decreeing that the FAI team be officially designated as the Republic of Ireland, while the IFA team was to become Northern Ireland. The IFA objected and in 1954 was permitted to continue using the name Ireland in Home Internationals, based on the 1923 agreement. This practice was discontinued in the late 1970s. (Note: The last match played as Ireland was 1978 versus Scotland, however, apart from this match, all British Championship matches had been played as "Northern Ireland" since the 1973–74 tournament. In the 1972–73 tournament, the first two matches were played as "Ireland" and the third as "Northern Ireland". In the 1971–72 tournament, the first was played as "Ireland" and the second and third as "Northern Ireland". 1970–71 was the last tournament in which all matches were played under the name "Ireland".)

== 1880s ==
=== 1882 ===
18 February 1882 International Friendly	Ireland	0–13	England	Belfast, Ireland
Match 1		Report	Vaughton 3'; J. Brown 8'; A. Brown 15'; C. Bambridge; H. Cursham	Stadium: Knock Ground; Attendance: 2,500; Referee: Robert M. Kennedy (Ireland)

25 February 1882 International Friendly	Wales	7–1	Ireland	Wrexham, Wales
Match 2	Price 41'; Owen 44'; Morgan 10'	Report	Johnston 20'	Stadium: Racecourse Ground; Attendance: 2,000; Referee: Robert E. Lythgoe (England)

=== 1883 ===
24 February 1883 International Friendly	England	7–0	Ireland	Liverpool, England
Match 3	Whateley 15', 46'; Cobbold 17', 19'; Dunn 44', 80'; Pawson 88'	Report		Stadium: Aigburth Cricket Ground; Attendance: 2,500; Referee: John K. McDowell (Scotland)

17 March 1883 International Friendly	Ireland	1–1	Wales	Belfast, Ireland
Match 4	Morrow 67'	Report	Roberts 50'	Stadium: Ballynafeigh Park; Attendance: 1,000; Referee: John K. McDowell (Scotland)

=== 1884 ===
26 January 1884 1883–84 British Home Championship	Ireland	0–5	Scotland	Belfast, Ireland
Match 5		Report	Harrower 12', 86'; Gossland 30', 70'; Goudie 60'	Stadium: Ulster Cricket Ground; Attendance: 2,000; Referee: Thomas Hindle (England)

9 February 1884 1883–84 British Home Championship	Wales	6–0	Ireland	Wrexham, Wales
Match 6	Owen 55', 70'; Shaw 20', 68'; Eyton-Jones 59'; Jones 82'	Report		Stadium: Racecourse Ground; Attendance: 2,000; Referee: Robert M. Sloane (England)

23 February 1884 1883–84 British Home Championship	Ireland	1–8	England	Belfast, Ireland
Match 7	McWha 88'	Report	Cursham 75'; Johnson 15'; C. Bambridge 18'; A. Bambridge	Stadium: Ulster Cricket Ground; Attendance: 3,000; Referee: Thomas Lawrie (Scotland)

=== 1885 ===
28 February 1885 1884–85 British Home Championship	England	4–0	Ireland	Manchester, England
Match 8	Bambridge 44'; Spilsbury 75'; Eames 77' (o.g.); Brown 77'	Report		Stadium: Whalley Range; Attendance: 6,000

14 March 1885 1884–85 British Home Championship	Scotland	8–2	Ireland	Glasgow, Scotland
Match 9	Lamont 10'; Turner 12'; Calderwood 15'; Marshall 35'; Higgins 51', 60', 70'; Barbour 53'	Report	Gibb 85', 90'	Stadium: Hampden Park, Glasgow; Attendance: 6,000; Referee: William Pierce Dix (England)

11 April 1885 1884–85 British Home Championship	Ireland	2–8	Wales	Belfast, Ireland
Match 10	Molyneux 23'; Dill 40'	Report	Owen 50'; Sisson 52', 59', 60'; Roach 55', 64'; Burke 69'; Jones 89'	Stadium: Ulster Cricket Ground; Attendance: 1,500; Referee: John K. McDowell (Scotland)

=== 1886 ===
27 February 1886 1885–86 British Home Championship	Wales	5–0	Ireland	Wrexham, Wales
Match 11	Roberts; Wilding; Hersee; Bryan; Sisson	Report		Stadium: Racecourse Ground; Attendance: 700; Referee: Richard P. Gregson (England)

13 March 1886 1885–86 British Home Championship	Ireland	1–6	England	Belfast, Ireland
Match 12	Williams 15'	Report	Spilsbury; Lindley; Dewhurst	Stadium: Ulster Cricket Ground; Attendance: 4,500; Referee: James E. McKillop (Scotland)

20 March 1886 1885–86 British Home Championship	Ireland	2–7	Scotland	Belfast, Ireland
Match 13	Condy 19'; Johnston 44'	Report	Heggie 15', 18', 25', 60'; Kelly 35'; Dunbar 40'; Gourlay 75'	Stadium: Ulster Cricket Ground; Attendance: 3,000; Referee: George T. Wolstenholme (Ireland)

=== 1887 ===
5 February 1887 1886–87 British Home Championship	England	7–0	Ireland	Sheffield, England
Match 14	Dewhurst 2', 87'; Cobbold 25', 47'; Lindley 26', 43', 49'	Report		Stadium: Bramall Lane; Attendance: 6,000; Referee: Alexander Hunter (Wales)

19 February 1887 1886–87 British Home Championship	Scotland	4–1	Ireland	Glasgow, Scotland
Match 15	Watt 5'; Jenkinson 43'; Johnstone 55'; Lowe 75'	Report	Browne 41'	Stadium: Hampden Park; Attendance: 1,000; Referee: Alexander Hunter (Wales)

12 March 1887 1886–87 British Home Championship	Ireland	4–1	Wales	Belfast, Ireland
Match 16	Stanfield 20'; Browne 44'; Peden 65'; Sherrard 70'	Report	Sabine 55'	Stadium: Oldpark Avenue; Attendance: 4,000; Referee: James E. McKillop (Scotland)

=== 1888 ===
3 March 1888 1887–88 British Home Championship	Wales	11–0	Ireland	Wrexham, Wales
Match 17	J. Doughty 1', 89'; R. Doughty 3'; Howell 15'; Wilding 55'; Pryce-Jones	Report		Stadium: Racecourse Ground; Attendance: 2,000; Referee: Thomas Hindle (England)

24 March 1888 1887–88 British Home Championship	Ireland	2–10	Scotland	Belfast, Ireland
Match 18	Lemon 18'; Dalton 24'	Report	Dewar 5'; Dickson 8', 33', 40', 45'; Breckenridge 15'; Aitken 30'; McCallum 53'; Wilson 77' (o.g.); Stewart 83'	Stadium: Oldpark Avenue; Attendance: 5,000; Referee: Robert Parlane (Scotland)

7 April 1888 1887–88 British Home Championship	Ireland	1–5	England	Belfast, Ireland
Match 19	Crone 32'	Report	Dewhurst 10'; Allen 14', 39', 60'; Lindley	Stadium: Ulster Cricket Ground; Attendance: 7,000; Referee: James E. McKillop (Scotland)

=== 1889 ===
2 March 1889 1888–89 British Home Championship	England	6–1	Ireland	Liverpool, England
Match 20	Yates; Shelton; Lofthouse; Brodie	Report	Wilton 10'	Stadium: Anfield; Attendance: 6,500; Referee: Alfred Owen Davies (Wales)

9 March 1889 1888–89 British Home Championship	Scotland	7–0	Ireland	Glasgow, Scotland
Match 21	Watt 7', 10'; Black 25'; Groves 32', 50', 70'; McInnes 88'	Report		Stadium: Ibrox Park; Attendance: 6,000; Referee: William H. Stacey (England)

27 April 1889 1888–89 British Home Championship	Ireland	1–3	Wales	Belfast, Ireland
Match 22	Lemon 1'	Report	Jarrett 20', 44', 60'	Stadium: Ulster Cricket Ground; Attendance: 1,500; Referee: Thomas R. Park (Scotland)

== 1890s ==
=== 1890 ===
8 February 1890 1889–90 British Home Championship	Wales	5–2	Ireland	Shrewsbury, England
Match 23	Owen 8'; Wilcock 27'; Lewis; Pryce-Jones 56', 90'	Report	Dalton 11', 44'	Stadium: Old Racecourse; Referee: James E. McKillop (Scotland)

15 March 1890 1889–90 British Home Championship	Ireland	1–9	England	Belfast, Ireland
Match 24	Reynolds 70'	Report	Geary 15', 60', 80'; Townley 16', 84'; Lofthouse 40'; Davenport 46', 75'; Barton 88'	Stadium: Ulster Cricket Ground; Attendance: 5,000; Referee: James E. McKillop (Scotland)

29 March 1890 1889–90 British Home Championship	Ireland	1–4	Scotland	Belfast, Ireland
Match 25	Peden 25'	Report	Rankin 10', 70', 80'; Wyllie 50'	Stadium: Ulster Cricket Ground; Attendance: 5,000; Referee: William H. Stacey (England)

=== 1891 ===
7 February 1891 1890–91 British Home Championship	Ireland	7–2	Wales	Belfast, Ireland
Match 26	Dalton 19'; Stanfield 22', 34', 42', 80'; Gaffikin 60'; Torrans 63'	Report	Roberts 10'; Davies 37'	Stadium: Ulsterville; Attendance: 12,000; Referee: Robert F. Harrison (Scotland)

7 March 1891 1890–91 British Home Championship	England	6–1	Ireland	Wolverhampton, England
Match 27	Cotterill 15'; Henfrey 17'; Daft 35'; Lindley 60', 83'; Bassett 63'	Report	Whiteside 61'	Stadium: Molineux; Attendance: 15,231; Referee: Richard Thomas Gough (Wales)

28 March 1891 1890–91 British Home Championship	Scotland	2–1	Ireland	Glasgow, Scotland
Match 28	Low 6'; Waddell 60'	Report	Stanfield 70'	Stadium: Celtic Park; Attendance: 8,000; Referee: William H. Stacey (England)

=== 1892 ===
27 February 1892 1891–92 British Home Championship	Wales	1–1	Ireland	Bangor, Wales
Match 29	Lewis 22'	Report	Stanfield 87'	Stadium: Penrhyn Park; Attendance: 4,000; Referee: James Campbell (Scotland)

5 March 1892 1891–92 British Home Championship	Ireland	0–2	England	Belfast, Ireland
Match 30		Report	Daft 44', 47'	Stadium: Solitude; Attendance: 8,000; Referee: Robert F. Harrison (Scotland)

19 March 1892 1891–92 British Home Championship	Ireland	2–3	Scotland	Belfast, Ireland
Match 31	Williamson 42'; Gaffikin 86'	Report	Keillor 17'; Lambie 28'; Ellis 70'	Stadium: Solitude; Attendance: 10,500; Referee: John Taylor (Wales)

=== 1893 ===
25 February 1893 1892–93 British Home Championship	England	6–1	Ireland	Birmingham, England
Match 32	Gilliat 8', 18', 30'; Smith 43'; Winckworth 60'; Sandilands 75'	Report	Gaffikin 9'	Stadium: Wellington Road; Attendance: 10,000; Referee: Thomas R. Park (Scotland)

25 March 1893 1892–93 British Home Championship	Scotland	6–1	Ireland	Glasgow, Scotland
Match 33	Sellar 10', 27'; Torrans 20' (o.g.); McMahon 28'; Kelly 60'; Hamilton 70'	Report	Gaffikin 44'	Stadium: Celtic Park; Attendance: 12,000; Referee: John Taylor (Wales)

8 April 1893 1892–93 British Home Championship	Ireland	4–3	Wales	Belfast, Ireland
Match 34	Peden 5', 50', 58'; Wilton 82'	Report	G. Owen 8', 34'; W. Owen 80'	Stadium: Solitude; Attendance: 3,000; Referee: James Campbell (Scotland)

=== 1894 ===
24 February 1894 1893–94 British Home Championship	Wales	4–1	Ireland	Swansea, Wales
Match 35	Lewis 55', 82'; James 65'; Rea 75'	Report	Stanfield 20'	Stadium: St Helens Rugby Ground; Attendance: 7,000; Referee: James Campbell (Scotland)

3 March 1894 1893–94 British Home Championship	Ireland	2–2	England	Belfast, Ireland
Match 36	Stanfield 70'; Gibson 89'	Report	Devey 42'; Spiksley 55'	Stadium: Solitude; Attendance: 8,000; Referee: Thomas R. Park (Scotland)

31 March 1894 1893–94 British Home Championship	Ireland	1–2	Scotland	Belfast, Ireland
Match 37	Stanfield 65'	Report	Torrans 25' (o.g.); Taylor 28'	Stadium: Solitude; Attendance: 6,000; Referee: Edward Phennah (Wales)

=== 1895 ===
9 March 1895 1894–95 British Home Championship	England	9–0	Ireland	Derby, England
Match 38	Torrens 3' (o.g.); Bloomer 4', 58'; Becton 15', 60'; Bassett 30'; Howell 36'; Goodall 65', 87'	Report		Stadium: County Ground; Attendance: 10,000; Referee: James H. Robertson (Scotland)

16 March 1895 1894–95 British Home Championship	Ireland	2–2	Wales	Belfast, Ireland
Match 39	Gaukrodger 32'; Sherrard 42'	Report	Trainer 10', 85'	Stadium: Solitude; Attendance: 6,000; Referee: William H. Jope (England)

30 March 1895 1894–95 British Home Championship	Scotland	3–1	Ireland	Glasgow, Scotland
Match 40	Lambie 1'; Walker 60', 70'	Report	Sherrard 35'	Stadium: Celtic Park; Attendance: 15,000; Referee: Thomas B. Mitchell (England)

=== 1896 ===
29 February 1896 1895–96 British Home Championship	Wales	6–1	Ireland	Wrexham, Wales
Match 41	Lewis 9', 20'; Meredith 23', 84'; Morris 34'; Pugh 60'	Report	Turner 70'	Stadium: Racecourse Ground; Attendance: 3,000; Referee: James Cooper (England)

7 March 1896 1895–96 British Home Championship	Ireland	0–2	England	Belfast, Ireland
Match 42		Report	Smith 40'; Bloomer 75'	Stadium: Solitude; Attendance: 12,000; Referee: James H. Robertson (Scotland)

28 March 1896 1895–96 British Home Championship	Ireland	3–3	Scotland	Belfast, Ireland
Match 43	Barron 20', 32'; Milne 43' (pen.)	Report	McColl 7', 25'; Murray 78'	Stadium: Solitude; Attendance: 8,000; Referee: James Cooper (England)

=== 1897 ===
20 February 1897 1896–97 British Home Championship	England	6–0	Ireland	Nottingham, England
Match 44	Bloomer 17', 85'; Wheldon 27', 30', 55'; Athersmith 75'	Report		Stadium: Trent Bridge; Attendance: 13,490; Referee: Thomas Robertson (Scotland)

6 March 1897 1896–97 British Home Championship	Ireland	4–3	Wales	Belfast, Ireland
Match 45	Barron 7'; Stanfield 62'; Pyper 66'; Peden 68'	Report	Meredith 19', 36'; Jenkyns 27'	Stadium: Solitude; Attendance: 10,000; Referee: Thomas Robertson (Scotland)

27 March 1897 1896–97 British Home Championship	Scotland	5–1	Ireland	Glasgow, Scotland
Match 46	McPherson 5', 70'; Gibson 15'; McColl 25'; King 40'	Report	Pyper 62'	Stadium: Ibrox Park; Attendance: 15,000; Referee: James Cooper (Wales)

=== 1898 ===
19 February 1898 1897–98 British Home Championship	Wales	0–1	Ireland	Llandudno, Wales
Match 47		Report	Peden 85'	Stadium: The Oval; Attendance: 6,000; Referee: Thomas Robertson (Scotland)

5 March 1898 1897–98 British Home Championship	Ireland	2–3	England	Belfast, Ireland
Match 48	Pyper 15'; McAllen 70'	Report	Smith 37'; Athersmith 40'; Morren 50'	Stadium: Solitude; Attendance: 12,000; Referee: Thomas Robertson (Scotland)

26 March 1898 1897–98 British Home Championship	Ireland	0–3	Scotland	Belfast, Ireland
Match 49		Report	Roberson 30'; McColl 42'; Stewart 70'	Stadium: Solitude; Attendance: 5,000; Referee: John Lewis (England)

=== 1899 ===
18 February 1899 1898–99 British Home Championship	England	13–2	Ireland	Sunderland, England
Match 50	Frank Forman 15'; Fred Forman 20', 52'; Athersmith 25'; Smith 32', 59', 60', 63'; Bloomer 40', 89'; Settle 53', 55', 80'	Report	McAllen 65' (pen.); Campbell 88'	Stadium: Roker Park; Attendance: 13,000; Referee: Alexander Hamilton (Scotland)

4 March 1899 1898–99 British Home Championship	Ireland	1–0	Wales	Belfast, Ireland
Match 51	Meldon 60'	Report		Stadium: Grosvenor Park; Attendance: 10,000; Referee: Charles E. Sutcliffe (England)

25 March 1899 1898–99 British Home Championship	Scotland	9–1	Ireland	Glasgow, Scotland
Match 52	McColl 5', 25', 47'; Christie 10'; Hamilton 20', 65'; Bell 35'; Campbell 70', 80'	Report	Goodall 54'	Stadium: Celtic Park; Attendance: 12,000; Referee: Charles E. Sutcliffe (England)
