= Northern Ireland national football team records and statistics =

This page details Northern Ireland national football team records and statistics; the most capped players, the players with the most goals, and Northern Ireland's match record by opponent and decade.

== Player records ==
Players still active are highlighted in green

=== Most capped players ===
As of 17 November 2026 after the match against Hungary.

Rank	Player	Caps	Goals	First Cap	Last Cap
1	Steven Davis	140	13	9 February 2005 vs. (Canada)	27 September 2022 vs. (Greece)
2	Pat Jennings	119	0	15 April 1964 vs. (Wales)	12 June 1986 vs. (Brazil)
3	Aaron Hughes	112	1	25 March 1998 vs. (Slovakia)	3 June 2018 vs. (Panama)
4	Jonny Evans	107	6	6 September 2006 vs. (Spain)	8 June 2024 vs. (Spain)
5	David Healy	95	36	23 February 2000 vs. (Luxembourg)	26 March 2013 vs. (Israel)
5	Josh Magennis	95	12	26 May 2010 vs. (Turkey)	17 November 2026 vs. (Hungary)
7	Mal Donaghy	91	0	16 May 1980 vs. (Scotland)	11 June 1994 vs. (Mexico)
8	Kyle Lafferty	89	20	21 May 2006 vs. (Uruguay)	12 June 2022 vs. (Cyprus)
9	Sammy McIlroy	88	5	16 February 1972 vs. (Spain)	15 October 1986 vs. (England)
9	Maik Taylor	88	0	27 March 1999 vs. (Germany)	11 October 2011 vs. (Italy)
11	Keith Gillespie	86	2	7 September 1995 vs. (Portugal)	19 November 2008 vs. (Hungary)
12	Paddy McNair	85	7	25 March 2015 vs. (Scotland)	5 October 2026 vs. (Georgia (country))
13	Gareth McAuley	80	9	4 June 2005 vs. (Germany)	18 November 2018 vs. (Austria)
14	Chris Baird	79	0	3 June 2003 vs. (Italy)	12 June 2016 vs. (Poland)
15	Jimmy Nicholl	73	1	24 March 1976 vs. (Israel)	12 June 1986 vs. (Brazil)
15	Niall McGinn	73	6	19 November 2008 vs. (Hungary)	12 June 2022 vs. (Cyprus)
15	Craig Cathcart	73	2	3 September 2010 vs. (Slovenia)	7 September 2023 vs. (Slovenia)
18	Corry Evans	72	2	6 June 2009 vs. (Italy)	11 June 2024 vs. (Andorra)
19	Michael Hughes	71	5	13 November 1991 vs. (Denmark)	8 September 2004 vs. (Wales)
20	David McCreery	67	0	8 May 1976 vs. (Scotland)	18 May 1990 vs. (Uruguay)
21	Nigel Worthington	66	0	22 May 1984 vs. (Wales)	11 February 1997 vs. (Belgium)
22	Chris Brunt	65	3	18 August 2004 vs. (Switzerland)	12 November 2017 vs. (Switzerland)
23	Martin O'Neill	64	8	13 October 1971 vs. (Soviet Union)	14 November 1984 vs. (Finland)
24	George Saville	64	0	5 October 2017 vs. (Germany)	31 March 2026 vs. (Wales)
25	Gerry Armstrong	63	12	27 April 1977 vs. (West Germany)	12 June 1986 vs. (Brazil)
26	Stuart Dallas	62	3	27 May 2011 vs. (Wales)	29 March 2022 vs. (Hungary)
27	Terry Neill	59	2	25 April 1961 vs. (Italy)	19 May 1973 vs. (Wales)
27	Iain Dowie	59	12	27 March 1990 vs. (Norway)	9 September 1999 vs. (Germany)
29	Oliver Norwood	57	0	11 August 2010 vs. (Montenegro)	15 October 2018 vs. (Bosnia and Herzegovina)
29	Shane Ferguson	57	2	6 June 2009 vs. (Italy)	23 March 2023 vs. (San Marino)
31	Danny Blanchflower	56	2	1 October 1949 vs. (Scotland)	28 November 1962 vs. (Poland)
31	Billy Bingham	56	9	12 May 1951 vs. (France)	20 November 1963 vs. (Scotland)
31	Damien Johnson	56	0	29 May 1999 vs. (Republic of Ireland)	14 October 2009 vs. (Czech Republic)
34	Jimmy McIlroy	55	10	6 October 1951 vs. (Scotland)	24 November 1965 vs. (Albania)
35	Stephen Craigan	54	0	12 February 2003 vs. (Finland)	29 March 2011 vs. (Slovenia)
36	Allan Hunter	53	1	22 October 1969 vs. (Soviet Union)	21 November 1979 vs. (Republic of Ireland)
36	John McClelland	53	1	16 May 1980 vs. (Scotland)	27 March 1990 vs. (Norway)
36	Bailey Peacock-Farrell	53	0	29 May 2018 vs. (Panama)	14 November 2025 vs. (Slovakia)
39	Alan McDonald	52	3	16 October 1985 vs. (Romania)	27 March 1996 vs. (Norway)
39	Jim Magilton	52	5	5 February 1991 vs. (Poland)	27 March 2002 vs. (Liechtenstein)
41	Sammy Nelson	51	1	21 April 1970 vs. (England)	1 July 1982 vs. (Austria)
41	Chris Nicholl	51	3	30 October 1974 vs. (Sweden)	12 October 1983 vs. (Turkey)
41	Gerry Taggart	51	7	27 March 1990 vs. (Norway)	12 October 2002 vs. (Spain)
44	Bryan Hamilton	50	4	11 December 1968 vs. (Turkey)	18 June 1980 vs. (Australia)
44	James Quinn	50	4	24 April 1996 vs. (Sweden)	11 October 2006 vs. (Latvia)

Players with an equal number of caps are ranked in chronological order of reaching the milestone.

=== Top goalscorers ===
As of 17 November 2026 after the match against Hungary.

Rank	Player	NI Career	Goals	Caps	Goals per game	First Goal	Last Goal
1	David Healy	2000–2013	36	95	0.38	23 February 2000 vs. (Luxembourg)	14 November 2012 vs. (Azerbaijan)
2	Kyle Lafferty	2006–2022	20	89	0.22	16 August 2006 vs. (Finland)	11 November 2016 vs. (Azerbaijan)
3	Billy Gillespie	1913–1932	13	25	0.52	15 February 1913 vs. (England)	20 October 1926 vs. (England)
3	Colin Clarke	1986–1993	13	38	0.34	23 April 1986 vs. (Morocco)	9 September 1992 vs. (Albania)
3	Steven Davis	2005–2022	13	140	0.09	8 October 2005 vs. (Wales)	25 March 2022 vs. (Luxembourg)
6	Joe Bambrick	1928–1940	12	11	1.09	22 October 1928 vs. (England)	16 March 1938 vs. (Wales)
6	Gerry Armstrong	1977–1986	12	63	0.19	16 November 1977 vs. (Belgium)	14 November 1984 vs. (Finland)
6	Jimmy Quinn	1984–1995	12	46	0.26	16 October 1984 vs. (Israel)	11 October 1995 vs. (Liechtenstein)
6	Iain Dowie	1990–1999	12	59	0.2	16 October 1991 vs. (Austria)	18 November 1998 vs. (Moldova)
6	Josh Magennis	2010–	12	95	0.13	8 October 2015 vs. (Greece)	15 October 2024 vs. (Bulgaria)
11	Olphie Stanfield	1887–1897	11	30	0.37	12 March 1887 vs. (Wales)	6 March 1897 vs. (Wales)
11	Isaac Price	2023–	11	38	0.29	7 September 2023 vs. (Slovenia)	2 October 2026 vs. (Ukraine)
13	Jimmy McIlroy	1951–1965	10	55	0.18	6 October 1956 vs. (England)	22 November 1961 vs. (England)
13	Peter McParland	1954–1962	10	34	0.29	31 March 1954 vs. (Wales)	9 November 1960 vs. (Scotland)
13	Johnny Crossan	1959–1967	10	24	0.42	28 November 1962 vs. (Poland)	2 October 1965 vs. (Scotland)
16	Billy Bingham	1951–1963	9 (Note: Some sources list Bingham as having scored ten goals, but a goal against Spain in 1958 credited to him was more likely scored by Wilbur Cush.)	56	0.16	3 November 1954 vs. (Scotland)	12 October 1963 vs. (Scotland)
16	George Best	1964–1977	9	37	0.24	14 November 1964 vs. (Switzerland)	21 April 1971 vs. (Cyprus)
16	Norman Whiteside	1982–1989	9	38	0.24	21 September 1983 vs. (Austria)	6 September 1989 vs. (Hungary)
16	Gareth McAuley	2005–2018	9	80	0.11	11 February 2009 vs. (San Marino)	11 November 2016 vs. (Azerbaijan)
20	Derek Dougan	1958–1973	8	43	0.19	13 April 1961 vs. (Wales)	21 April 1971 vs. (Cyprus)
20	Willie Irvine	1963–1972	8	23	0.35	30 May 1963 vs. (Spain)	10 September 1968 vs. (Israel)
20	Martin O'Neill	1971–1984	8	64	0.13	28 March 1973 vs. (Portugal)	12 September 1984 vs. (Romania)
23	John Peden	1887–1899	7	24	0.29	12 March 1887 vs. (Wales)	19 February 1898 vs. (Wales)
23	Billy McAdams	1954–1962	7	15	0.47	3 November 1954 vs. (Scotland)	25 April 1961 vs. (Italy)
23	Sammy Wilson	1961–1967	7	12	0.58	12 October 1963 vs. (Scotland)	30 March 1966 vs. (Wales)
23	Gerry Taggart	1990–2002	7	51	0.14	5 February 1991 vs. (Poland)	3 June 1998 vs. (Spain)
23	Paddy McNair	2015–	7	85	0.08	11 June 2019 vs. (Belarus)	5 September 2024 vs. (Luxembourg)

Players with an equal number of goals are ranked in chronological order of reaching the milestone.

=== Most captaincies ===
Players still active are highlighted in green

As of 17 November 2026 after the match against Hungary.

Rank	Player	Captaincy Span	Times	Record as Captain									First Captaincy	Last Captaincy
Rank	Player	Captaincy Span	Times	W	D	L	GF	GA	GD	Win %	Draw %	Loss %	First Captaincy	Last Captaincy
1	Steven Davis	2006–2022	82	26	23	33	87	92	-5	31.71%	28.05%	40.24%	21 May 2006 vs. (Uruguay)	29 March 2022 vs. (Hungary)
2	Aaron Hughes	2002–2015	47	12	18	17	46	56	-10	25.53%	38.30%	36.17%	14 April 2002 vs. (Spain)	31 May 2015 vs. (Qatar)
3	Danny Blanchflower	1954–1962	42	10	12	20	60	96	-36	23.81%	28.57%	47.62%	3 November 1954 vs. (Scotland)	28 November 1962 vs. (Poland)
4	Terry Neill	1963–1973	38	16	8	14	58	53	5	42.11%	21.05%	36.84%	3 April 1963 vs. (Wales)	19 May 1973 vs. (Wales)
5	Martin O'Neill	1980–1984	33	12	11	10	29	34	-5	36.36%	33.33%	30.30%	26 March 1980 vs. (Israel)	14 November 1984 vs. (Finland)
6	Alan McDonald	1990–1995	26	8	8	10	28	29	-1	30.77%	30.77%	38.46%	17 May 1990 vs. (Uruguay)	7 June 1995 vs. (Latvia)
7	Steve Lomas	1997–2003	22	5	6	11	14	26	-12	22.73%	27.27%	50.00%	10 September 1997 vs. (Albania)	2 April 2003 vs. (Greece)
8	Allan Hunter	1974–1979	19	6	4	9	19	31	-12	31.58%	21.05%	47.37%	30 October 1974 vs. (Sweden)	21 November 1979 vs. (Republic of Ireland)
8	Sammy McIlroy	1980–1986	19	7	7	5	15	15	0	36.84%	36.84%	26.32%	16 May 1980 vs. (Scotland)	12 June 1986 vs. (Brazil)
10	John McClelland	1984–1990	17	4	5	8	15	21	-6	23.53%	29.41%	47.06%	16 October 1984 vs. (Israel)	27 March 1990 vs. (Norway)
11	Jonny Evans	2015–2024	16	4	2	10	14	24	-10	25.00%	12.50%	62.50%	25 March 2015 vs. (Scotland)	8 June 2024 vs. (Spain)
12	Billy Gillespie	1921–1930	14	4	3	7	19	27	-8	28.57%	21.43%	50.00%	22 October 1921 vs. (England)	20 October 1930 vs. (England)
12	Maik Taylor	2004–2011	14	4	4	6	13	18	-5	28.57%	28.57%	42.86%	31 March 2004 vs. (Estonia)	11 October 2011 vs. (Italy)
14	Dave Clements	1973–1976	13	3	3	7	6	12	-6	23.08%	23.08%	53.85%	16 October 1973 vs. (Bulgaria)	27 March 1976 vs. (Wales)
15	Billy Cook	1935–1939	11	2	1	8	11	32	-21	18.18%	9.09%	72.73%	13 November 1935 vs. (Scotland)	15 March 1939 vs. (Wales)
15	Jackie Vernon	1947–1951	11	1	2	8	13	40	-27	9.09%	18.18%	72.73%	4 October 1947 vs. (Scotland)	20 November 1951 vs. (England)
15	Derek Dougan	1971–1973	11	4	2	5	9	9	0	36.36%	18.18%	45.45%	21 April 1971 vs. (Cyprus)	14 February 1973 vs. (Cyprus)
18	Billy Scott	1908–1912	10	1	1	8	8	29	-21	10.00%	10.00%	80.00%	15 February 1908 vs. (England)	10 February 1912 vs. (England)
18	Iain Dowie	1996–1999	10	3	4	3	7	10	-3	30.00%	40.00%	30.00%	31 August 1996 vs. (Ukraine)	29 May 1999 vs. (Republic of Ireland)
19	Alf McMichael	1952–1954	9	1	2	6	10	21	-11	11.11%	22.22%	66.67%	19 March 1952 vs. (Wales)	2 October 1954 vs. (England)
19	Nigel Worthington	1993–1997	9	3	2	4	14	14	0	33.33%	22.22%	44.44%	8 September 1993 vs. (Latvia)	22 January 1997 vs. (Italy)

Captaincy appearances are only awarded to players who were assigned the captaincy at the start of an international game.
Players with an equal number of captaincies are ranked in chronological order of reaching the milestone.

=== Most clean sheets ===
Players still active are highlighted in green

As of 5 October 2026 after the match against Georgia.

Rank	Player	NI Career	Clean Sheets	Caps	Clean sheets per game	First Clean Sheet	Last Clean Sheet
1	Pat Jennings	1964–1986	45	119	0.38	29 April 1964 vs. (Uruguay)	23 April 1986 vs. (Morocco)
2	Maik Taylor	1999–2011	34	88	0.39	31 March 1999 vs. (Moldova)	8 October 2010 vs. (Italy)
3	Roy Carroll	1997–2017	18	45	0.4	21 May 1997 vs. (Thailand)	2 June 2017 vs. (New Zealand)
3	Bailey Peacock-Farrell	2018–	18	53	0.32	29 May 2018 vs. (Panama)	10 October 2025 vs. (Slovakia)
5	Michael McGovern	2010–2020	16	33	0.48	30 May 2010 vs. (Chile)	5 September 2019 vs. (Luxembourg)
6	Tommy Wright	1989–1999	11	31	0.35	26 April 1989 vs. (Malta)	29 March 1997 vs. (Portugal)
7	Pierce Charles	2024–	10	18	0.56	12 October 2024 vs. (Belarus)	14 November 2026 vs. (Ukraine)
8	Alan Mannus	2004–2016	7	9	0.78	6 June 2004 vs. (Trinidad and Tobago)	27 May 2016 vs. (Belarus)
9	Conor Hazard	2018–	7	11	0.64	3 June 2018 vs. (Costa Rica)	31 March 2026 vs. (Wales)
10	Elisha Scott	1920–1936	6	31	0.19	18 April 1925 vs. (Wales)	5 December 1931 vs. (Wales)
10	Jim Platt	1976–1986	6	23	0.26	24 March 1976 vs. (Israel)	15 December 1982 vs. (Albania)
10	Alan Fettis	1991–1998	6	25	0.24	26 April 1995 vs. (Latvia)	10 October 1998 vs. (Finland)
13	Billy Scott	1903–1913	5	25	0.2	21 March 1903 vs. (Scotland)	19 March 1910 vs. (Scotland)
14	Harry Gregg	1954–1963	4	25	0.16	10 April 1957 vs. (Wales)	17 October 1961 vs. (Greece)
14	Allen McKnight	1987–1989	4	10	0.4	11 November 1987 vs. (Turkey)	14 September 1988 vs. (Republic of Ireland)
14	Jonny Tuffey	2008–2011	4	8	0.5	12 August 2009 vs. (Israel)	17 November 2010 vs. (Morocco)

A goalkeeper is awarded a clean sheet if he does not concede a goal during his time on the pitch.

=== Hat-tricks ===
The result is presented with Northern Ireland's score first.

Player	Goals	Date	Opponent	Venue	Result	Type of Game	Ref
Olphie Stanfield	4*	7 February 1891	Wales	Ulsterville, Belfast, Northern Ireland	7–2	1890–91 British Home Championship	
Jack Peden	3	8 April 1893	Wales	Solitude, Belfast, Northern Ireland	4–3	1892–93 British Home Championship	
Andy Gara	3	22 February 1902	Wales	Ninian Park, Cardiff, Wales	3–0	1901–02 British Home Championship	
Harold Sloan	3	2 April 1906	Wales	Racecourse Ground, Wrexham, Wales	4–4	1905–06 British Home Championship	
Joe Bambrick	6*	1 February 1930	Wales	Celtic Park, Belfast, Northern Ireland	7–0	1929–30 British Home Championship	
Billy McAdams	3	26 October 1960	West Germany	Windsor Park, Belfast, Northern Ireland	3–4	1962 FIFA World Cup Group 3 Qualifier	
Johnny Crossan	3	7 May 1965	Albania	Windsor Park, Belfast, Northern Ireland	4–1	1966 FIFA World Cup Group 5 Qualifier	
George Best	3	21 April 1971	Cyprus	Windsor Park, Belfast, Northern Ireland	5–0	UEFA Euro 1972 Group 4 Qualifier	
Colin Clarke	3	11 September 1991	Faroe Islands	Landskrona IP, Landskrona, Sweden (Note: Match played in Sweden as the Faroe Islands did not have a UEFA-approved grass pitch arena.)	5–0	UEFA Euro 1992 Group 4 Qualifier	
David Healy	3	6 September 2006	Spain	Windsor Park, Belfast, Northern Ireland	3–2	UEFA Euro 2008 Group F Qualifier	
David Healy	3	24 March 2007	Liechtenstein	Rheinpark, Vaduz, Liechtenstein	4–1	UEFA Euro 2008 Group F Qualifier	
Isaac Price	3	15 October 2024	Bulgaria	Windsor Park, Belfast, Northern Ireland	5–0	2024–25 UEFA Nations League C	

More than a hat-trick scored *

=== Red cards ===
The result is presented with Northern Ireland's score first.

Player	Date	Opponent	Venue	Result	Type of Game	Ref
Jimmy Nicholson	17 October 1961	Greece	Windsor Park, Belfast, Northern Ireland	2–0	(Chile) 1962 FIFA World Cup UEFA Group 3 Qualifier	
Billy Ferguson	22 October 1966	England	Windsor Park, Belfast, Northern Ireland	0–2	(England) (Scotland) (Wales) (Northern Ireland) 1966–67 British Home Championship (Italy) UEFA Euro 1968 Group 8 Qualifier	
George Best	18 April 1970	Scotland	Windsor Park, Belfast, Northern Ireland	0–1	(England) (Scotland) (Wales) (Northern Ireland) 1969–70 British Home Championship	
George Best	18 October 1972	Bulgaria	Vasil Levski National Stadium, Sofia, Bulgaria	0–3	(Germany) 1974 FIFA World Cup UEFA Group 6 Qualifier	
Terry Cochrane	3 June 1981	Sweden	Råsunda Stadium, Stockholm, Sweden	0–1	(Spain) 1982 FIFA World Cup UEFA Group 6 Qualifier	
Mal Donaghy	25 June 1982	Spain	Estadio Luis Casanova, Valencia, Spain	1–0	(Spain) 1982 FIFA World Cup Group 5	
Phil Gray	23 March 1994	Romania	Windsor Park, Belfast, Northern Ireland	2–0	International Friendly	
Iain Dowie	27 March 1996	Norway	Windsor Park, Belfast, Northern Ireland	0–2	International Friendly	
Steve Lomas	27 March 2002	Liechtenstein	Rheinpark, Vaduz, Liechtenstein	0–0	International Friendly	
James Quinn	2 April 2003	Greece	Windsor Park, Belfast, Northern Ireland	0–2	(Portugal) UEFA Euro 2004 Group 6 Qualifier	
Keith Gillespie	2 April 2003	Greece	Windsor Park, Belfast, Northern Ireland	0–2	(Portugal) UEFA Euro 2004 Group 6 Qualifier	
George McCartney	11 October 2003	Greece	Leoforos Alexandras Stadium, Athens, Greece	0–1	(Portugal) UEFA Euro 2004 Group 6 Qualifier	
Mark Williams	30 May 2004	Barbados	Barbados National Stadium, Saint Michael, Barbados	1–1	International Friendly	
Michael Hughes	8 September 2004	Wales	Millennium Stadium, Cardiff, Wales	2–2	(Germany) 2006 FIFA World Cup UEFA Group 6 Qualifier	
David Healy	8 September 2004	Wales	Millennium Stadium, Cardiff, Wales	2–2	(Germany) 2006 FIFA World Cup UEFA Group 6 Qualifier	
Keith Gillespie	17 August 2005	Malta	Ta' Qali National Stadium, Ta' Qali, Malta	1–1	International Friendly	
Damien Johnson	12 October 2005	Austria	Ernst-Happel-Stadion, Vienna, Austria	0–2	(Germany) 2006 FIFA World Cup UEFA Group 6 Qualifier	
James Quinn	26 May 2006	Romania	Soldier Field, Chicago, United States	0–2	International Friendly	
Ryan McGivern	20 August 2008	Scotland	Hampden Park, Glasgow, Scotland	0–0	International Friendly	
Adam Thompson	24 May 2011	Republic of Ireland	Aviva Stadium, Dublin, Republic of Ireland	0–5	(Republic of Ireland) 2011 Nations Cup	
Chris Brunt	6 September 2013	Portugal	Windsor Park, Belfast, Northern Ireland	2–4	(Brazil) 2014 FIFA World Cup UEFA Group F Qualifier	
Kyle Lafferty	6 September 2013	Portugal	Windsor Park, Belfast, Northern Ireland	2–4	(Brazil) 2014 FIFA World Cup UEFA Group F Qualifier	
Jonny Evans	11 October 2013	Azerbaijan	Eighth Kilometer District Stadium, Baku, Azerbaijan	0–2	(Brazil) 2014 FIFA World Cup UEFA Group F Qualifier	
Gareth McAuley	5 March 2014	Cyprus	GSP Stadium, Strovolos, Cyprus	0–0	International Friendly	
Chris Baird	7 September 2015	Hungary	Windsor Park, Belfast, Northern Ireland	1–1	(France) UEFA Euro 2016 Group F Qualifier	
Josh Magennis	4 September 2020	Romania	Arena Națională, Bucharest, Romania	1–1	2020–21 UEFA Nations League - Group B1	
Jamal Lewis	9 October 2021	Switzerland	Stade de Genève, Geneva, Switzerland	0–2	(Qatar) 2022 FIFA World Cup UEFA Group C Qualifier	
Shea Charles	17 October 2023	Slovenia	Windsor Park, Belfast, Northern Ireland	0–1	(Germany) UEFA Euro 2024 Group H Qualifier	
Brodie Spencer	10 June 2025	Iceland	Windsor Park, Belfast, Northern Ireland	1–0	International Friendly	
Daniel Ballard	14 November 2025	Slovakia	Košická futbalová aréna, Košice, Slovakia	0–1	(Canada) (Mexico) (United States) 2026 FIFA World Cup UEFA Group A Qualifier	
Tom Atcheson	4 June 2026	Guinea	Estadio Municipal de La Línea de la Concepción, La Línea de la Concepción, Spain	1–0	International Friendly	

== Individual and Team records ==
=== Age records ===
- Youngest player to make debut: Samuel Johnston – 15 years and 154 days, 18 February 1882 vs England
- Oldest player to play a game: Elisha Scott – 42 years and 200 days, 11 March 1936 vs Wales
- Youngest player to play at World Cup finals: Norman Whiteside – 17 years and 41 days, 17 June 1982 vs Yugoslavia
- Oldest player to play at World Cup finals: Pat Jennings – 41 years and 0 days, 12 June 1986 vs Brazil
- Youngest player to score a goal: Samuel Johnston – 15 years and 161 days, 25 February 1882 vs Wales

=== Goal records ===
- First Irish goal: Samuel Johnston – 15 years and 161 days, 25 February 1882 vs Wales
- Most goals scored in one game by a player: 6 – Joe Bambrick, 1 February 1930 vs Wales

=== Firsts ===
- First International: 18 February 1882 vs England
- First home international: 18 February 1882 vs England
- First win: 12 March 1887 vs Wales
- First overseas opponent: Norway, 25 May 1922
- First win over an overseas opponent: 1 May 1957 vs Portugal

=== Streaks ===
- Most consecutive victories: 5
  - 26 March 2017 – 4 September 2017
  - 21 March 2019 – 5 September 2019
- Most consecutive matches without defeat: 12
  - 29 March 2015 – 4 June 2016
- Most consecutive draws: 4
  - 11 September 2012 – 6 February 2013
- Most consecutive matches without a draw: 24
  - 26 January 1884 – 28 March 1891
- Most consecutive matches without victory: 21
  - 5 November 1947 – 7 November 1953
- Most consecutive defeats: 11
  - 26 January 1884 – 19 February 1887
  - 3 October 1959 – 7 October 1961
- Most consecutive matches scoring: 13
  - 4 November 1933 – 16 March 1938
- Most consecutive matches without scoring: 13
  - 27 March 2002 – 11 October 2003
- Most consecutive matches conceding a goal: 46
  - 18 February 1882 – 27 March 1897
- Most consecutive matches without conceding a goal: 6
  - 27 March 1985 – 26 February 1986

=== Biggest wins ===
Best Results by Northern Ireland
	Date	Opponent	Round	Result	Difference
1	1 February 1930	Wales	(England) (Scotland) (Wales) (Ireland) 1929–30 British Home Championship	7–0	+7
2	7 February 1891	Wales	(England) (Scotland) (Wales) (Ireland) 1890–91 British Home Championship	7–2	+5
2	21 April 1971	Cyprus	(Belgium) UEFA Euro 1972 Group 4 Qualifier	5–0	+5
2	11 September 1991	Faroe Islands	(Sweden) UEFA Euro 1992 Group 4 Qualifier	5–0	+5
2	15 October 2024	Bulgaria	2024–25 UEFA Nations League C	5–0	+5
4	5 December 1931	Wales	(England) (Scotland) (Wales) (Ireland) 1931–32 British Home Championship	4–0	+4
4	11 October 1995	Liechtenstein	(England) UEFA Euro 1996 Group 6 Qualifier	4–0	+4
4	15 October 2008	San Marino	(South Africa) 2010 FIFA World Cup Group 3 Qualifier	4–0	+4
4	10 August 2011	Faroe Islands	(Poland) (Ukraine) UEFA Euro 2012 Group C Qualifier	4–0	+4
4	8 October 2016	San Marino	(Russia) 2018 FIFA World Cup Group 3 Qualifier	4–0	+4
4	11 November 2016	Azerbaijan	(Russia) 2018 FIFA World Cup Group 3 Qualifier	4–0	+4

=== Heaviest defeats ===
Worst Results by Northern Ireland
	Date	Opponent	Round	Result	Difference
1	18 February 1882	England	International Friendly	0–13	-13
2	18 February 1899	England	(England) (Scotland) (Wales) (Ireland) 1898–99 British Home Championship	2–13	-11
2	3 March 1888	Wales	(England) (Scotland) (Wales) (Ireland) 1887–88 British Home Championship	0–11	-11
2	23 February 1901	Scotland	(England) (Scotland) (Wales) (Ireland) 1900–01 British Home Championship	0–11	-11
3	9 March 1895	England	(England) (Scotland) (Wales) (Ireland) 1894–95 British Home Championship	0–9	-9
4	24 March 1888	Scotland	(England) (Scotland) (Wales) (Ireland) 1887–88 British Home Championship	2–10	-8
4	15 March 1890	England	(England) (Scotland) (Wales) (Ireland) 1889–90 British Home Championship	1–9	-8
4	25 March 1899	Scotland	(England) (Scotland) (Wales) (Ireland) 1898–99 British Home Championship	1–9	-8
5	16 November 1949	England	(England) (Scotland) (Wales) (Ireland) 1949–50 British Home Championship (Brazil) 1950 FIFA World Cup Qualifying Group 1	2–9	-7
5	23 February 1884	England	(England) (Scotland) (Wales) (Ireland) 1883–84 British Home Championship	1–8	-7
5	24 February 1883	England	International Friendly	0–7	-7
5	5 February 1887	England	(England) (Scotland) (Wales) (Ireland) 1886–87 British Home Championship	0–7	-7
5	9 March 1889	Scotland	(England) (Scotland) (Wales) (Ireland) 1888–89 British Home Championship	0–7	-7
5	16 November 1938	England	(England) (Scotland) (Wales) (Ireland) 1938–39 British Home Championship	0–7	-7
6	14 March 1885	Scotland	(England) (Scotland) (Wales) (Ireland) 1884–85 British Home Championship	2–8	-6
6	11 April 1885	Wales	(England) (Scotland) (Wales) (Ireland) 1884–85 British Home Championship	2–8	-6
6	1 October 1949	Scotland	(England) (Scotland) (Wales) (Ireland) 1949–50 British Home Championship (Brazil) 1950 FIFA World Cup Qualifying Group 1	2–8	-6
6	25 February 1882	Wales	International Friendly	1–7	-6
6	9 February 1884	Wales	(England) (Scotland) (Wales) (Ireland) 1883–84 British Home Championship	0–6	-6
6	20 February 1897	England	(England) (Scotland) (Wales) (Ireland) 1896–97 British Home Championship	0–6	-6
6	2 June 2012	Netherlands	International Friendly	0–6	-6

== Competition Records ==
=== FIFA World Cup ===
Qualification

- First match: 1 October 1949 vs Scotland
- First goal: Sammy Smyth vs Scotland, 1 October 1949

Finals

- First finals: Sweden 1958
- Total number of times qualified for the finals: 3 (1958), (1982) and (1986)
- First game: 8 June 1958 vs Czechoslovakia
- First goal: Wilbur Cush vs Czechoslovakia, 8 June 1958
- Most Successful final: 1958 – Quarter finals
- World Cup top goal scorer: 5
  - Peter McParland (1958)

=== UEFA European Championship ===
Qualification

- First match: 10 October 1962 vs Poland
- First goal: Derek Dougan vs Poland, 10 October 1962

Finals

- First finals: France 2016
- Total number of times qualified for the finals: 1 (2016)
- First game: 12 June 2016 vs Poland
- First goal: Gareth McAuley vs Ukraine, 16 June 2016
- Most Successful final: 2016 - Round of 16
- European Championship scorer: 1
  - Gareth McAuley (2016)
  - Niall McGinn (2016)

=== UEFA Nations League ===
Qualification

- First match: 8 September 2018 vs Bosnia and Herzegovina
- First goal: Will Grigg vs Bosnia and Herzegovina, 8 September 2018

== Rankings ==
- Highest FIFA Rank: 20 (September 2017)
- Lowest FIFA Rank: 129 (September 2012)
- Highest Elo Rank: 5 (1882)
- Lowest Elo Rank: 114 (11 October 2013)

== Performance ==
=== Performance by competition ===
As of 17 November 2026 after the match against Hungary.

Competition	Pld	W	D	L	GF	GA	GD	Win %	Draw %	Loss %
FIFA World Cup	13	3	5	5	13	23	-10	23.08%	38.46%	38.46%
FIFA World Cup qualification	149	48	39	62	162	176	-14	32.21%	26.17%	41.61%
UEFA European Championship	4	1	0	3	2	3	-1	25.00%	0.00%	75.00%
UEFA European Championship qualification	130	47	27	56	140	167	-27	36.15%	20.77%	43.08%
UEFA Nations League	28	7	8	12	30	32	-2	25.00%	32.14%	42.86%
British Home Championship	265	48	49	168	284	710	-426	18.11%	18.49%	63.40%
Competitive (Note: 12 games of the British Home Championship doubled as qualification games for the World Cup and European championship: Matches 171, 172, 173 – 1950 World Cup qualification and 1949–50 British Home Championship; Matches 185, 186, 187 – 1954 World Cup qualification and 1953–54 British Home Championship; Matches 254, 255, 256, 257, 258, 259 – Euro 68 qualifying and 1966–67 British Home Championship and 1967–68 British Home Championship; Each game is counted in both applicable lines, but only counts once towards the subtotal.)	528	137	115	276	571	1029	-458	25.95%	21.78%	52.27%
International Friendlies	134	37	37	60	127	213	-86	27.61%	27.61%	44.78%
Minor Tournaments	5	0	0	5	1	14	-13	0.00%	0.00%	100.00%
Total	716	189	164	363	749	1306	-557	26.40%	22.91%	50.70%

Statistics include official FIFA recognised matches only

=== Performance by manager ===
Current manager highlighted in green

As of 17 November 2026 after the match against Hungary.

Manager	First Game	Last Game	Pld	W	D	L	GF	GA	GD	Win %	Draw %	Loss %
(Northern Ireland) Irish FA Selection Committee	18 February 1882 vs. (England)	12 May 1951 vs. (France)	177	29	27	121	200	568	-368	16.38%	15.25%	68.36%
(Northern Ireland) Peter Doherty	6 October 1951 vs. (Scotland)	9 May 1962 vs. (Netherlands)	51	9	14	28	67	119	-52	17.65%	27.45%	54.90%
(Northern Ireland) Bertie Peacock	10 October 1962 vs. (Poland)	12 April 1967 vs. (Wales)	28	11	4	13	46	54	-8	39.29%	14.29%	46.43%
(Northern Ireland) Billy Bingham	21 October 1967 vs. (Scotland)	22 May 1971 vs. (Wales)	20	8	3	9	24	22	+2	40.00%	15.00%	45.00%
(Northern Ireland) Terry Neill	22 September 1971 vs. (Soviet Union)	30 October 1974 vs. (Sweden)	20	6	6	8	16	18	-2	30.00%	30.00%	40.00%
(Northern Ireland) Dave Clements	16 April 1975 vs. (Socialist Federal Republic of Yugoslavia)	14 May 1976 vs. (Wales)	11	3	2	6	7	15	-8	27.27%	18.18%	54.55%
(Northern Ireland) Danny Blanchflower	13 October 1976 vs. (Netherlands)	21 November 1979 vs. (Republic of Ireland)	24	6	5	13	19	38	-19	25.00%	20.83%	54.17%
(Northern Ireland) Billy Bingham	26 March 1980 vs. (Israel)	17 November 1993 vs. (Republic of Ireland)	98	32	31	35	91	107	-16	32.65%	31.63%	35.71%
(Northern Ireland) Bryan Hamilton	23 March 1994 vs. (Romania)	11 October 1997 vs. (Portugal)	31	8	8	15	34	41	-7	25.81%	25.81%	48.39%
(England) Lawrie McMenemy	25 March 1998 vs. (Slovakia)	9 October 1999 vs. (Finland)	14	4	3	7	9	25	-16	28.57%	21.43%	50.00%
(Northern Ireland) Sammy McIlroy	23 February 2000 vs. (Luxembourg)	11 October 2003 vs. (Greece)	29	5	7	17	19	40	-21	17.24%	24.14%	58.62%
(Northern Ireland) Lawrie Sanchez	18 February 2004 vs. (Norway)	28 March 2007 vs. (Sweden)	32	11	10	11	35	42	-7	34.38%	31.25%	34.38%
(Northern Ireland) Nigel Worthington	22 August 2007 vs. (Liechtenstein)	11 October 2011 vs. (Italy)	41	9	10	22	35	55	-20	21.95%	24.39%	53.66%
(Northern Ireland) Michael O'Neill	29 February 2012 vs. (Norway)	19 November 2019 vs. (Germany)	72	26	18	28	75	83	-8	36.11%	25.00%	38.89%
(England) Ian Baraclough	4 September 2020 vs. (Romania)	27 September 2022 vs. (Greece)	28	6	8	14	27	36	-9	21.43%	28.57%	50.00%
(Northern Ireland) Michael O'Neill	23 March 2023 vs. (San Marino)		40	16	8	16	45	43	2	40.00%	20.00%	40.00%
Total			716	189	164	363	749	1306	-557	26.40%	22.91%	50.70%

Statistics include official FIFA recognised matches only

=== Performance by venue ===
As of 17 November 2026 after the match against Hungary.

Venue	Played	Won	Drawn	Lost	GF	GA	GD	Win %	Draw %	Loss %
Home	338	118	76	144	428	544	-116	34.91%	22.49%	42.60%
Away	347	64	82	201	297	709	-412	18.44%	23.63%	57.93%
Neutral	31	7	6	18	24	53	-29	22.58%	19.35%	58.06%
Total	716	189	164	363	749	1306	-557	26.40%	22.91%	50.70%

=== Performance by confederation ===
As of 17 November 2026 after the match against Hungary.

Confederation	Played	Won	Drawn	Lost	GF	GA	GD	Win %	Draw %	Loss %
UEFA	681	178	155	348	715	1265	-550	26.14%	22.76%	51.10%
CONCACAF	12	3	4	5	13	15	-2	25.00%	33.33%	41.67%
CONMEBOL	11	2	0	9	6	16	-10	18.18%	0.00%	81.82%
CAF	5	2	2	1	6	5	1	40.00%	40.00%	20.00%
OFC (Note: Includes matches against Australia until their move to AFC in 2006.)	4	3	1	0	6	3	+3	75.00%	25.00%	0.00%
AFC	3	1	2	0	3	2	+1	33.33%	66.67%	0.00%

Statistics include official FIFA recognised matches only

=== Performance by decade ===
Still active decade highlighted in green

As of 17 November 2026 after the match against Hungary.

Decade	Pld	W	D	L	GF	GA	GD	Win %	Draw %	Loss %
1880s	22	1	1	20	20	139	-119	4.55%	4.55%	90.91%
1890s	30	5	4	21	45	124	-79	16.67%	13.33%	70.00%
1900s	31	5	4	22	24	83	-59	16.13%	12.90%	70.97%
1910s	16	5	3	8	20	30	-10	31.25%	18.75%	50.00%
1920s	33	5	8	20	32	63	-31	15.15%	24.24%	60.61%
1930s	29	6	3	20	38	75	-37	20.69%	10.34%	68.97%
1940s	11	2	2	7	16	40	-24	18.18%	18.18%	63.64%
1950s	43	8	15	20	54	89	-35	18.60%	34.88%	46.51%
1960s	52	16	8	28	77	111	-34	30.77%	15.38%	53.85%
1970s	64	19	13	32	53	80	-27	29.69%	20.31%	50.00%
1980s	73	23	24	26	59	77	-18	31.51%	32.88%	35.62%
1990s	70	21	18	31	75	96	-21	30.00%	25.71%	44.29%
2000s	84	23	23	38	79	107	-28	27.38%	27.38%	45.24%
2010s	90	28	22	40	85	113	-28	31.11%	24.44%	44.44%
2020s	68	22	16	30	72	79	-7	32.35%	23.53%	44.12%
Total	716	189	164	363	749	1306	-557	26.40%	22.91%	50.70%

Statistics include official FIFA recognised matches only

== All-time records ==
=== Head to head records ===
All opponents of the Northern Ireland national team

As of 17 November 2026 after the match against Hungary.

Positive Record Neutral Record Negative Record

Opponent	Confederation	Pld	W	D	L	GF	GA	GD	Win %	Draw %	Loss %
Albania	UEFA	9	5	2	2	13	5	+8	55.56%	22.22%	22.22%
Algeria	CAF	1	0	1	0	1	1	0	0.00%	100.00%	0.00%
Andorra	UEFA	1	1	0	0	2	0	+2	100.00%	0.00%	0.00%
Argentina	CONMEBOL	1	0	0	1	1	3	-2	0.00%	0.00%	100.00%
Armenia	UEFA	4	0	2	2	1	3	-2	0.00%	50.00%	50.00%
Australia	AFC	3	2	1	0	5	3	+2	66.67%	33.33%	0.00%
Austria	UEFA	13	4	3	6	19	21	-2	30.77%	23.08%	46.15%
Azerbaijan	UEFA	6	3	2	1	8	3	+5	50.00%	33.33%	16.67%
Barbados	CONCACAF	1	0	1	0	1	1	0	0.00%	100.00%	0.00%
Belarus	UEFA	5	4	1	0	8	1	+7	80.00%	20.00%	0.00%
Belgium	UEFA	3	2	0	1	6	2	+4	66.67%	0.00%	33.33%
Bosnia and Herzegovina	UEFA	3	0	1	2	2	5	-3	0.00%	33.33%	66.67%
Brazil	CONMEBOL	1	0	0	1	0	3	-3	0.00%	0.00%	100.00%
Bulgaria	UEFA	10	3	2	6	13	12	+1	27.27%	18.18%	54.55%
Canada	CONCACAF	3	0	1	2	1	4	-3	0.00%	33.33%	66.67%
Chile	CONMEBOL	4	0	0	4	1	6	-5	0.00%	0.00%	100.00%
Colombia	CONMEBOL	1	0	0	1	0	2	-2	0.00%	0.00%	100.00%
Costa Rica	CONCACAF	1	0	0	1	0	3	-3	0.00%	0.00%	100.00%
Croatia	UEFA	1	0	0	1	0	3	-3	0.00%	0.00%	100.00%
Cyprus	UEFA	8	3	4	1	13	3	+10	37.50%	50.00%	12.50%
Czech Republic	UEFA	7	2	3	2	6	6	0	28.57%	42.86%	28.57%
Denmark	UEFA	14	3	5	6	12	17	-5	21.43%	35.71%	42.86%
England	UEFA	98	7	16	75	81	323	-242	7.14%	16.33%	76.53%
Estonia	UEFA	7	5	0	2	9	7	+2	71.43%	0.00%	28.57%
Faroe Islands	UEFA	6	4	2	0	16	3	+13	66.67%	33.33%	0.00%
Finland	UEFA	11	4	2	5	12	18	-6	36.36%	18.18%	45.45%
France	UEFA	10	0	3	7	5	25	-20	0.00%	30.00%	70.00%
Georgia	UEFA	3	2	1	0	5	1	+4	66.67%	33.33%	0.00%
Germany	UEFA	14	0	3	11	8	35	-27	0.00%	21.43%	78.57%
Greece	UEFA	9	3	0	6	11	13	-2	33.33%	0.00%	66.67%
Guinea	CAF	1	1	0	0	1	0	+1	100.00%	0.00%	0.00%
Honduras	CONCACAF	1	0	1	0	1	1	0	0.00%	100.00%	0.00%
Hungary	UEFA	9	1	3	5	5	10	-5	11.11%	33.33%	55.56%
Iceland	UEFA	7	3	0	4	7	7	0	42.86%	0.00%	57.14%
Israel	UEFA	10	4	5	1	14	8	+6	40.00%	50.00%	10.00%
Italy	UEFA	12	1	3	8	6	21	-15	8.33%	25.00%	66.67%
Kazakhstan	UEFA	1	0	0	2	0	2	-2	0.00%	0.00%	100.00%
Kosovo	UEFA	2	1	0	1	4	4	0	50.00%	0.00%	50.00%
Latvia	UEFA	7	5	0	2	8	4	+4	71.43%	0.00%	28.57%
Liechtenstein	UEFA	5	4	1	0	15	3	+12	80.00%	20.00%	0.00%
Lithuania	UEFA	4	3	1	0	8	3	+5	75.00%	25.00%	0.00%
Luxembourg	UEFA	9	6	2	1	18	9	+9	66.67%	22.22%	11.11%
Malta	UEFA	8	6	2	0	14	1	+13	75.00%	25.00%	0.00%
Mexico	CONCACAF	2	1	0	1	4	4	0	50.00%	0.00%	50.00%
Moldova	UEFA	2	0	2	0	2	2	0	0.00%	100.00%	0.00%
Montenegro	UEFA	1	0	0	1	0	2	-2	0.00%	0.00%	100.00%
Morocco	CAF	2	1	1	0	3	2	+1	50.00%	50.00%	0.00%
Netherlands	UEFA	8	1	3	4	5	17	-12	12.50%	37.50%	50.00%
New Zealand	OFC	1	1	0	0	1	0	+1	100.00%	0.00%	0.00%
Norway	UEFA	12	2	0	10	11	27	-16	16.67%	0.00%	83.33%
Panama	CONCACAF	1	0	1	0	0	0	0	0.00%	100.00%	0.00%
Poland	UEFA	10	4	2	4	13	14	-1	40.00%	20.00%	40.00%
Portugal	UEFA	13	2	7	4	13	14	-1	15.38%	53.85%	30.77%
Qatar	AFC	1	0	1	0	1	1	0	0.00%	100.00%	0.00%
Republic of Ireland	UEFA	11	2	5	4	4	17	-13	18.18%	45.45%	36.36%
Romania	UEFA	9	3	4	2	9	9	0	33.33%	44.44%	22.22%
Russia	UEFA	2	1	0	1	1	2	-1	50.00%	0.00%	50.00%
Saint Kitts and Nevis	CONCACAF	1	1	0	0	2	0	+2	100.00%	0.00%	0.00%
San Marino	UEFA	6	6	0	0	19	0	+19	100.00%	0.00%	0.00%
Scotland	UEFA	97	16	17	64	82	261	-179	16.49%	17.53%	65.98%
Serbia	UEFA	3	0	0	3	1	4	-3	0.00%	0.00%	100.00%
Slovakia	UEFA	7	2	1	4	5	7	-2	28.57%	14.29%	57.14%
Slovenia	UEFA	7	3	1	3	5	7	-2	42.86%	14.29%	42.86%
South Africa	CAF	1	0	0	1	1	2	-1	0.00%	0.00%	100.00%
South Korea	AFC	1	1	0	0	2	1	+1	100.00%	0.00%	0.00%
Spain	UEFA	19	2	5	12	12	43	-31	10.53%	26.32%	63.16%
Sweden	UEFA	8	3	1	4	11	12	-1	37.50%	12.50%	50.00%
Switzerland	UEFA	9	2	4	3	4	6	-2	22.22%	44.44%	33.33%
Thailand	AFC	1	0	1	0	0	0	0	0.00%	100.00%	0.00%
Trinidad and Tobago	CONCACAF	1	1	0	0	3	0	+3	100.00%	0.00%	0.00%
Turkey	UEFA	12	5	2	5	12	12	0	41.67%	16.67%	41.67%
Ukraine	UEFA	8	3	2	3	7	4	+3	37.50%	25.00%	37.50%
United States	CONCACAF	1	0	0	1	1	2	-1	0.00%	0.00%	100.00%
Uruguay	CONMEBOL	4	2	0	2	4	2	+2	50.00%	0.00%	50.00%
Wales	UEFA	97	27	25	45	133	192	-59	27.84%	25.77%	46.39%
Former Teams
Czechoslovakia	UEFA	2	2	0	0	3	1	+2	100.00%	0.00%	0.00%
Serbia and Montenegro	UEFA	1	0	1	0	1	1	0	0.00%	100.00%	0.00%
Soviet Union	UEFA	4	0	2	2	1	4	-3	0.00%	50.00%	50.00%
West Germany	UEFA	7	2	1	4	8	15	-7	28.57%	14.29%	57.14%
Yugoslavia	UEFA	8	1	1	6	4	14	-10	12.50%	12.50%	75.00%
Total		716	189	164	363	749	1306	-557	26.40%	22.91%	50.70%

Statistics include official FIFA recognised matches only

=== FIFA members yet to play against Northern Ireland ===
As of 17 November 2026 after the match against Hungary.

AFC
Afghanistan
Bahrain
Bangladesh
Bhutan
Brunei
Cambodia
China
Chinese Taipei
Guam
Hong Kong
India
Indonesia
Iran
Iraq
Japan
Jordan
Kuwait
Kyrgyzstan
Laos
Lebanon
Macau
Malaysia
Maldives
Mongolia
Myanmar
Nepal
North Korea
Oman
Pakistan
Palestine
Philippines
Saudi Arabia
Singapore
Sri Lanka
Syria
Tajikistan
Timor-Leste
Turkmenistan
United Arab Emirates
Uzbekistan
Vietnam
Yemen

CAF
Angola
Benin
Botswana
Burkina Faso
Burundi
Cameroon
Cape Verde
Central African Republic
Chad
Comoros
Congo
Djibouti
DR Congo
Egypt
Equatorial Guinea
Eritrea
Eswatini
Ethiopia
Gabon
Gambia
Ghana
Guinea-Bissau
Ivory Coast
Kenya
Lesotho
Liberia
Libya
Madagascar
Malawi
Mali
Mauritania
Mauritius
Mozambique
Namibia
Niger
Nigeria
Rwanda
São Tomé and Príncipe
Senegal
Seychelles
Sierra Leone
Somalia
South Sudan
Sudan
Tanzania
Togo
Tunisia
Uganda
Zambia
Zimbabwe

CONCACAF
Anguilla
Antigua and Barbuda
Aruba
Bahamas
Belize
Bermuda
British Virgin Islands
Cayman Islands
Cuba
Curaçao
Dominica
Dominican Republic
El Salvador
Grenada
Guatemala
Guyana
Haiti
Jamaica
Montserrat
Nicaragua
Puerto Rico
Saint Lucia
Saint Vincent and the Grenadines
Suriname
Turks and Caicos Islands
U.S. Virgin Islands

CONMEBOL
Bolivia
Ecuador
Paraguay
Peru
Venezuela

OFC
American Samoa
Cook Islands
Fiji
New Caledonia
Papua New Guinea
Samoa
Solomon Islands
Tahiti
Tonga
Vanuatu

UEFA
Gibraltar
North Macedonia

== Competitive record ==
Champions Runners-up Third Place Fourth Place

=== FIFA World Cup ===
FIFA World Cup finals record										Qualification record						Manager(s)
Year	Round	Pos	Pld	W	D*	L	GF	GA	Squad	Pld	W	D	L	GF	GA	Manager(s)
(Uruguay) 1930	Not a FIFA member									Not a FIFA member						None
(Italy) 1934	Not a FIFA member									Not a FIFA member						None
(France) 1938	Not a FIFA member									Not a FIFA member						None
(Brazil) 1950	Did not qualify									3	0	1	2	4	17	Irish FA Committee
(Switzerland) 1954	Did not qualify									3	1	0	2	4	7	Peter Doherty
(Sweden) 1958	Quarter-finals	8th	5	2	1	2	6	10	Squad	4	2	1	1	6	3	Peter Doherty
(Chile) 1962	Did not qualify									4	1	0	3	7	8	Peter Doherty
(England) 1966	Did not qualify									6	3	2	1	9	5	Bertie Peacock
(Mexico) 1970	Did not qualify									4	2	1	1	7	3	Billy Bingham
(West Germany) 1974	Did not qualify									6	1	3	2	5	6	Terry Neill
(Argentina) 1978	Did not qualify									6	2	1	3	7	6	Danny Blanchflower
(Spain) 1982	Round of 16	9th	5	1	3	1	5	7	Squad	8	3	3	2	6	3	Billy Bingham
(Mexico) 1986	Group Stage	21st	3	0	1	2	2	6	Squad	8	4	2	2	8	5	Billy Bingham
(Italy) 1990	Did not qualify									8	2	1	5	6	12	Billy Bingham
(United States) 1994	Did not qualify									12	5	3	4	14	13	Billy Bingham
(France) 1998	Did not qualify									10	1	4	5	6	10	Bryan Hamilton
(South Korea) (Japan) 2002	Did not qualify									10	3	2	5	11	12	Sammy McIlroy
(Germany) 2006	Did not qualify									10	2	3	5	10	18	Lawrie Sanchez
(South Africa) 2010	Did not qualify									10	4	3	3	13	9	Nigel Worthington
(Brazil) 2014	Did not qualify									10	1	4	5	9	17	Michael O'Neill
(Russia) 2018	Did not qualify									12	6	2	4	17	7	Michael O'Neill
(Qatar) 2022	Did not qualify									8	2	3	3	6	7	Ian Baraclough
(Canada) (Mexico) (United States) 2026	Did not qualify									7	3	0	4	7	8	Michael O'Neill
Total	Quarter-finals	3/22	13	3	5	5	13	23	—	149	48	39	62	162	176	—
*Draws include knockout matches decided via penalty shoot-out.

=== UEFA European Championship ===
UEFA European Championship record										Qualification record						Manager(s)
Year	Round	Pos	Pld	W	D*	L	GF	GA	Squad	Pld	W	D	L	GF	GA	Manager(s)
(France) 1960	Did not enter									Did not enter						None
(Spain) 1964	Did not qualify									4	2	1	1	5	2	Bertie Peacock
(Italy) 1968	Did not qualify									6	1	1	4	2	8	Bertie Peacock, Billy Bingham (Note: Bertie Peacock managed for the first three qualifying matches. Billy Bingham managed the remainder of the qualification campaign.)
(Belgium) 1972	Did not qualify									6	2	2	2	10	6	Billy Bingham, Terry Neill (Note: Billy Bingham managed for the first three qualifying matches. Terry Neill managed the remainder of the qualification campaign.)
(Socialist Federal Republic of Yugoslavia) 1976	Did not qualify									6	3	0	3	8	5	Terry Neill, Dave Clements (Note: Terry Neill managed for the first two qualifying matches. Dave Clements managed the remainder of the qualification campaign.)
(Italy) 1980	Did not qualify									8	4	1	3	8	14	Danny Blanchflower
(France) 1984	Did not qualify									8	5	1	2	8	5	Billy Bingham
(West Germany) 1988	Did not qualify									6	1	1	4	2	10	Billy Bingham
(Sweden) 1992	Did not qualify									8	2	3	3	11	11	Billy Bingham
(England) 1996	Did not qualify									10	5	2	3	20	15	Bryan Hamilton
(Belgium) (Netherlands) 2000	Did not qualify									8	1	2	5	4	19	Lawrie McMenemy
(Portugal) 2004	Did not qualify									8	0	3	5	0	8	Sammy McIlroy
(Austria) (Switzerland) 2008	Did not qualify									12	6	2	4	17	14	Lawrie Sanchez, Nigel Worthington (Note: Lawrie Sanchez managed for the first six qualifying matches. Nigel Worthington managed the remainder of the qualification campaign.)
(Poland) (Ukraine) 2012	Did not qualify									10	2	3	5	9	13	Nigel Worthington
(France) 2016	Round of 16	16th	4	1	0	3	2	3	Squad	10	6	3	1	16	8	Michael O'Neill
(Europe) 2020	Did not qualify									10	4	2	4	11	16	Michael O'Neill, Ian Baraclough (Note: Michael O'Neill managed the team for the eight qualifying group stage matches. Ian Baraclough managed the team in the UEFA Euro 2020 qualifying play-offs.)
(Germany) 2024	Did not qualify									10	3	0	7	9	13	Michael O'Neill
Total	Round of 16	1/16	4	1	0	3	2	3	—	130	47	27	56	140	167	—
*Draws include knockout matches decided on penalty kicks.

=== UEFA Nations League ===
UEFA Nations League record											Manager(s)
Year	Division	Group	Pld	W	D	L	GF	GA	P/R	RK	Manager(s)
(Portugal) 2018–19	B	3	4	0	0	4	2	7	Same position	24th	Michael O'Neill
(Italy) 2020–21	B	1	6	0	2	4	4	11	▼	32nd	Ian Baraclough
(Netherlands) 2022–23	C	2	6	1	2	3	7	10	Same position	44th	Ian Baraclough
(Germany) 2024–25	C	3	6	3	2	1	11	3	▲	36th	Michael O'Neill
2026–27	B	2	4	3	3	0	6	1	▲	TBD	Michael O'Neill
Total			28	7	9	12	30	32	—	24th	—

=== British Home Championship ===
British Home Championship record
Year	Round	Pos	Pld	W	D	L	GF	GA	GD	Pts
(England) (Scotland) (Wales) (Ireland) 1883–84	Fourth place	4th	3	0	0	3	1	19	-18	0
(England) (Scotland) (Wales) (Ireland) 1884–85	Fourth place	4th	3	0	0	3	4	20	-16	0
(England) (Scotland) (Wales) (Ireland) 1885–86	Fourth place	4th	3	0	0	3	3	18	-15	0
(England) (Scotland) (Wales) (Ireland) 1886–87	Third place	3rd	3	1	0	2	5	12	-7	2
(England) (Scotland) (Wales) (Ireland) 1887–88	Fourth place	4th	3	0	0	3	3	26	-23	0
(England) (Scotland) (Wales) (Ireland) 1888–89	Fourth place	4th	3	0	0	3	2	16	-14	0
(England) (Scotland) (Wales) (Ireland) 1889–90	Fourth place	4th	3	0	0	3	4	18	-14	0
(England) (Scotland) (Wales) (Ireland) 1890–91	Third place	3rd	3	1	0	2	9	10	-1	2
(England) (Scotland) (Wales) (Ireland) 1891–92	Third place	3rd	3	0	1	2	3	6	-3	1
(England) (Scotland) (Wales) (Ireland) 1892–93	Third place	3rd	3	1	0	2	6	15	-9	2
(England) (Scotland) (Wales) (Ireland) 1893–94	Fourth place	4th	3	0	1	2	4	8	-4	1
(England) (Scotland) (Wales) (Ireland) 1894–95	Fourth place	4th	3	0	1	2	3	14	-11	1
(England) (Scotland) (Wales) (Ireland) 1895–96	Fourth place	4th	3	0	1	2	4	11	-7	1
(England) (Scotland) (Wales) (Ireland) 1896–97	Third place	3rd	3	1	0	2	5	14	-9	2
(England) (Scotland) (Wales) (Ireland) 1897–98	Third place	3rd	3	1	0	2	3	6	-3	2
(England) (Scotland) (Wales) (Ireland) 1898–99	Third place	3rd	3	1	0	2	4	22	-18	2
(England) (Scotland) (Wales) (Ireland) 1899–1900	Fourth place	4th	3	0	0	3	0	7	-7	0
(England) (Scotland) (Wales) (Ireland) 1900–01	Fourth place	4th	3	0	0	3	0	15	-15	0
(England) (Scotland) (Wales) (Ireland) 1901–02	Third place	3rd	3	1	0	2	4	6	-2	2
(England) (Scotland) (Wales) (Ireland) 1902–03	Champions	1st=	3	2	0	1	4	4	0	4
(England) (Scotland) (Wales) (Ireland) 1903–04	Runners-up	2nd	3	1	1	1	3	4	-1	3
(England) (Scotland) (Wales) (Ireland) 1904–05	Fourth place	4th	3	0	2	1	3	7	-4	2
(England) (Scotland) (Wales) (Ireland) 1905–06	Fourth place	4th	3	0	1	2	4	10	-6	1
(England) (Scotland) (Wales) (Ireland) 1906–07	Fourth place	4th	3	0	0	3	2	7	-5	0
(England) (Scotland) (Wales) (Ireland) 1907–08	Third place	3rd	3	1	0	2	2	8	-6	2
(England) (Scotland) (Wales) (Ireland) 1908–09	Fourth place	4th	3	0	0	3	2	12	-10	0
(England) (Scotland) (Wales) (Ireland) 1909–10	Third place	3rd	3	1	1	1	3	5	-2	3
(England) (Scotland) (Wales) (Ireland) 1910–11	Fourth place	4th	3	0	0	3	2	6	-4	0
(England) (Scotland) (Wales) (Ireland) 1911–12	Third place	3rd	3	1	0	2	5	12	-7	2
(England) (Scotland) (Wales) (Ireland) 1912–13	Fourth place	4th	3	1	0	2	3	4	-1	2
(England) (Scotland) (Wales) (Ireland) 1913–14	Champions	1st	3	2	1	0	6	2	+4	5
(England) (Scotland) (Wales) (Ireland) 1919–20	Fourth place	4th	3	0	2	1	3	6	-3	2
(England) (Scotland) (Wales) (Ireland) 1920–21	Fourth place	4th	3	0	0	3	1	6	-5	0
(England) (Scotland) (Wales) (Ireland) 1921–22	Fourth place	4th	3	0	2	1	3	4	-1	2
(England) (Scotland) (Wales) (Ireland) 1922–23	Third place	3rd	3	1	0	2	3	3	0	2
(England) (Scotland) (Wales) (Ireland) 1923–24	Third place	3rd	3	1	0	2	2	4	-2	2
(England) (Scotland) (Wales) (Ireland) 1924–25	Fourth place	4th	3	0	1	2	1	6	-5	1
(England) (Scotland) (Wales) (Ireland) 1925–26	Runners-up	2nd	3	1	1	1	3	4	-1	3
(England) (Scotland) (Wales) (Ireland) 1926–27	Third place	3rd	3	0	2	1	5	7	-2	2
(England) (Scotland) (Wales) (Ireland) 1927–28	Runners-up	2nd	3	2	0	1	4	2	+2	4
(England) (Scotland) (Wales) (Ireland) 1928–29	Fourth place	4th	3	0	1	2	6	11	-5	1
(England) (Scotland) (Wales) (Ireland) 1929–30	Third place	3rd	3	1	0	2	8	6	+2	2
(England) (Scotland) (Wales) (Ireland) 1930–31	Fourth place	4th	3	0	1	2	3	8	-5	1
(England) (Scotland) (Wales) (Ireland) 1931–32	Third place	3rd	3	1	0	2	7	9	-2	2
(England) (Scotland) (Wales) (Ireland) 1932–33	Fourth place	4th	3	0	0	3	1	9	-8	0
(England) (Scotland) (Wales) (Ireland) 1933–34	Third place	3rd	3	1	1	1	3	5	-2	3
(England) (Scotland) (Wales) (Ireland) 1934–35	Third place	3rd	3	1	0	2	4	6	-2	2
(England) (Scotland) (Wales) (Ireland) 1935–36	Fourth place	4th	3	1	0	2	5	7	-2	2
(England) (Scotland) (Wales) (Ireland) 1936–37	Fourth place	4th	3	0	0	3	3	10	-7	0
(England) (Scotland) (Wales) (Ireland) 1937–38	Third place	3rd	3	1	1	1	3	6	-3	3
(England) (Scotland) (Wales) (Ireland) 1938–39	Fourth place	4th	3	0	0	3	1	12	-11	0
(England) (Scotland) (Wales) (Ireland) 1946–47	Runners-up	2nd	3	1	1	1	4	8	-4	3
(England) (Scotland) (Wales) (Ireland) 1947–48	Third place	3rd	3	1	1	1	4	4	0	3
(England) (Scotland) (Wales) (Ireland) 1948–49	Fourth place	4th	3	0	0	3	4	11	-7	0
(England) (Scotland) (Wales) (Ireland) 1949–50	Fourth place	4th	3	0	1	2	4	17	-13	1
(England) (Scotland) (Wales) (Ireland) 1950–51	Fourth place	4th	3	0	0	3	3	12	-9	0
(England) (Scotland) (Wales) (Ireland) 1951–52	Fourth place	4th	3	0	0	3	0	8	-8	0
(England) (Scotland) (Wales) (Ireland) 1952–53	Third place	3rd	3	0	2	1	5	6	-1	2
(England) (Scotland) (Wales) (Northern Ireland) 1953–54	Third place	3rd	3	1	0	2	4	7	-3	2
(England) (Scotland) (Wales) (Northern Ireland) 1954–55	Fourth place	4th	3	0	1	2	4	7	-3	1
(England) (Scotland) (Wales) (Northern Ireland) 1955–56	Champions	1st=	3	1	1	1	3	5	-2	3
(England) (Scotland) (Wales) (Northern Ireland) 1956–57	Third place	3rd	3	0	2	1	1	2	-1	2
(England) (Scotland) (Wales) (Northern Ireland) 1957–58	Champions	1st=	3	1	2	0	5	4	+1	4
(England) (Scotland) (Wales) (Northern Ireland) 1958–59	Champions	1st=	3	1	2	0	9	6	+3	4
(England) (Scotland) (Wales) (Northern Ireland) 1959–60	Fourth place	4th	3	0	0	3	3	9	-6	0
(England) (Scotland) (Wales) (Northern Ireland) 1960–61	Fourth place	4th	3	0	0	3	5	15	-10	0
(England) (Scotland) (Wales) (Northern Ireland) 1961–62	Fourth place	4th	3	0	1	2	2	11	-9	1
(England) (Scotland) (Wales) (Northern Ireland) 1962–63	Fourth place	4th	3	0	0	3	3	12	-9	0
(England) (Scotland) (Wales) (Northern Ireland) 1963–64	Champions	1st=	3	2	0	1	8	11	-3	4
(England) (Scotland) (Wales) (Northern Ireland) 1964–65	Fourth place	4th	3	0	0	3	5	12	-7	0
(England) (Scotland) (Wales) (Northern Ireland) 1965–66	Runners-up	2nd	3	2	0	1	8	5	+3	4
(England) (Scotland) (Wales) (Northern Ireland) 1966–67	Fourth place	4th	3	0	1	2	1	4	-3	1
(England) (Scotland) (Wales) (Northern Ireland) 1967–68	Fourth place	4th	3	1	0	2	1	4	-3	2
(England) (Scotland) (Wales) (Northern Ireland) 1968–69	Third place	3rd	3	0	2	1	2	4	-2	2
(England) (Scotland) (Wales) (Northern Ireland) 1969–70	Fourth place	4th	3	0	0	3	1	5	-4	0
(England) (Scotland) (Wales) (Northern Ireland) 1970–71	Runners-up	2nd	3	2	0	1	2	1	+1	4
(England) (Scotland) (Wales) (Northern Ireland) 1971–72	Third place	3rd	3	1	1	1	1	2	-1	3
(England) (Scotland) (Wales) (Northern Ireland) 1972–73	Runners-up	2nd	3	2	0	1	4	3	+1	4
(England) (Scotland) (Wales) (Northern Ireland) 1973–74	Third place	3rd	3	1	0	2	1	2	-1	2
(England) (Scotland) (Wales) (Northern Ireland) 1974–75	Third place	3rd	3	1	1	1	1	3	-2	3
(England) (Scotland) (Wales) (Northern Ireland) 1975–76	Fourth place	4th	3	0	0	3	0	8	-8	0
(England) (Scotland) (Wales) (Northern Ireland) 1976–77	Fourth place	4th	3	0	1	2	2	6	-4	1
(England) (Scotland) (Wales) (Northern Ireland) 1977–78	Fourth place	4th	3	0	1	2	1	3	-2	1
(England) (Scotland) (Wales) (Northern Ireland) 1978–79	Fourth place	4th	3	0	1	2	1	4	-3	1
(England) (Scotland) (Wales) (Northern Ireland) 1979–80	Champions	1st	3	2	1	0	3	1	+2	5
(England) (Scotland) (Wales) (Northern Ireland) 1980–81	Cancelled (Note: The 1980–81 British Home Championship was cancelled due to The Troubles.)	–	1	0	0	1	0	2	-2	0
(England) (Scotland) (Wales) (Northern Ireland) 1981–82	Fourth place	4th	3	0	1	2	1	8	-7	1
(England) (Scotland) (Wales) (Northern Ireland) 1982–83	Third place	3rd	3	0	2	1	0	1	-1	2
(England) (Scotland) (Wales) (Northern Ireland) 1983–84	Champions	1st	3	1	1	1	3	2	+1	3
Total	8/88	8 Titles	265	48	49	168	284	710	-426	145

=== Minor tournaments ===
Year	Round	Pos	Pld	W	D	L	GF	GA	GD
1995 Canada Cup	Group stage	3rd	2	0	0	2	1	4	-3
(Republic of Ireland) 2011 Nations Cup	Group stage	4th	3	0	0	3	0	10	-10
Total			5	0	0	5	1	14	-13

== Honours ==
=== Titles ===
- British Home Championship
  - (gold) **Winners (3): 1914 (as Ireland), 1980, 1984
  - (gold) **Shared (5): 1903, 1956, 1958, 1959, 1964

== FIFA Rankings ==
Last updated 27 March 2023

Northern Ireland's Historical FIFA Ranking and Points Total
Year	January	February	March	April	May	June	July	August	September	October	November	December
Year	Pos (Pts)	Pos (Pts)	Pos (Pts)	Pos (Pts)	Pos (Pts)	Pos (Pts)	Pos (Pts)	Pos (Pts)	Pos (Pts)	Pos (Pts)	Pos (Pts)	Pos (Pts)
1992	–	–	–	–	–	–	–	–	–	–	–	43 (31)
1993	–	–	–	–	–	–	–	40 (37)	40 (37)	42 (36)	42 (37)	39 (38)
1994	39 (38)	38 (38)	42 (36)	35 (39)	33 (41)	41 (37)	39 (37)	39 (37)	45 (35)	39 (38)	44 (37)	45 (37)
1995	45 (37)	50 (37)	50 (37)	54 (35)	52 (36)	53 (35)	54 (36)	55 (35)	45 (35)	46 (38)	46 (39)	45 (39)
1996	48 (38)	51 (38)	51 (38)	57 (36)	60 (34)	60 (34)	60 (36)	63 (35)	65 (35)	74 (34)	75 (34)	64 (37)
1997	64 (37)	68 (37)	68 (37)	63 (40)	63 (40)	69 (39)	69 (39)	71 (39)	72 (38)	75 (38)	83 (36)	93 (34)
1998	93 (34)	99 (31)	98 (31)	92 (32)	90 (33)	90 (33)	88 (32)	90 (32)	94 (31)	87 (34)	88 (34)	86 (35)
1999	67 (467)	67 (465)	67 (463)	69 (459)	69 (455)	69 (462)	71 (460)	71 (459)	71 (456)	78 (441)	80 (435)	84 (427)
2000	84 (427)	88 (425)	88 (431)	87 (435)	92 (426)	95 (414)	95 (410)	98 (404)	96 (425)	91 (438)	90 (440)	93 (437)
2001	94 (437)	94 (436)	96 (433)	98 (430)	101 (423)	105 (420)	106 (413)	107 (411)	97 (446)	90 (465)	90 (465)	88 (465)
2002	89 (465)	92 (463)	92 (462)	91 (462)	90 (455)	90 (455)	89 (448)	90 (444)	98 (420)	98 (428)	100 (422)	103 (413)
2003	106 (413)	107 (411)	107 (409)	111 (404)	111 (399)	110 (408)	110 (403)	112 (395)	111 (404)	118 (393)	118 (389)	122 (383)
2004	124 (383)	124 (382)	124 (379)	115 (400)	114 (404)	110 (421)	112 (425)	110 (424)	109 (428)	110 (432)	107 (442)	107 (443)
2005	109 (442)	111 (441)	111 (439)	113 (435)	114 (430)	114 (425)	112 (418)	116 (410)	101 (464)	104 (451)	101 (460)	103 (461)
2006	103 (460)	102 (463)	98 (472)	96 (471)	96 (469)	96 (469)	75 (425)	72 (425)	58 (486)	45 (600)	48 (625)	48 (625)
2007	47 (625)	49 (602)	47 (615)	33 (742)	33 (742)	29 (838)	28 (838)	27 (886)	36 (707)	36 (716)	32 (780)	32 (780)
2008	32 (780)	34 (754)	34 (763)	34 (704)	34 (704)	32 (752)	33 (750)	32 (750)	32 (761)	35 (721)	42 (670)	52 (580)
2009	52 (580)	49 (593)	42 (619)	27 (795)	27 (795)	27 (820)	32 (784)	32 (784)	31 (795)	30 (775)	39 (737)	40 (729)
2010	40 (729)	39 (748)	50 (628)	57 (555)	56 (566)	56 (566)	59 (540)	59 (540)	45 (638)	41 (627)	42 (627)	43 (615)
2011	43 (615)	38 (615)	40 (605)	65 (520)	65 (520)	62 (498)	62 (498)	59 (545)	70 (477)	84 (421)	89 (403)	88 (403)
2012	87 (403)	86 (412)	87 (400)	100 (338)	100 (338)	103 (336)	102 (336)	101 (336)	129 (257)	117 (287)	100 (356)	96 (367)
2013	98 (367)	102 (354)	97 (367)	119 (285)	119 (285)	116 (304)	111 (307)	109 (307)	86 (431)	90 (399)	90 (381)	89 (381)
2014	90 (381)	85 (397)	86 (388)	84 (400)	84 (400)	90 (381)	89 (356)	95 (341)	71 (435)	43 (625)	47 (615)	48 (615)
2015	47 (615)	51 (626)	43 (679)	42 (672)	42 (672)	44 (676)	37 (721)	40 (721)	41 (687)	35 (724)	29 (797)	30 (825)
2016	30 (825)	29 (825)	28 (833)	26 (825)	26 (825)	25 (851)	28 (822)	28 (822)	30 (798)	36 (739)	32 (767)	32 (767)
2017	32 (767)	35 (772)	35 (786)	26 (823)	26 (823)	28 (837)	22 (897)	23 (897)	20 (945)	23 (889)	24 (867)	24 (867)
2018	25 (867)	26 (867)	24 (879)	27 (837)	27 (837)	29 (803)	29 (1887)	27 (1492)	28 (1487)	34 (1472)	35 (1465)	35 (1465)
2019	35 (1465)	36 (1465)	36 (1465)	33 (1481)	28 (1496)	28 (1496)	29 (1496)	29 (1496)	33 (1488)	34 (1483)	36 (1476)	36 (1476)
2020	36 (1476)	36 (1476)	36 (1476)	36 (1476)	36 (1476)	36 (1476)	36 (1476)	36 (1476)	38 (1468)	41 (1458)	45 (1440)	45 (1440)
2021	45 (1440)	45 (1440)	45 (1440)	48 (1426)	48 (1426)	48 (1426)	48 (1426)	51 (1422)	47 (1435)	58 (1412)	54 (1425)	54 (1425)
2022	54 (1425)	54 (1425)	54 (1425)	54 (1424)	54 (1424)	58 (1399)	58 (1399)	58 (1399)	58 (1399)	59 (1397)	59 (1397)	59 (1397)
2023	59 (1397)	59 (1397)	59 (1397)	(-)	(-)	(-)	(-)	(-)	(-)	(-)	-' (-)	-' (-)
Table Key				Highest position			Lowest position			Ranking formula adjusted		
