= 1890–91 British Home Championship =

Tournament details
- Host country: England, Ireland, Scotland and Wales
- Dates: 7 February – 6 April 1891
- Teams: 4

Final positions
- Champions: England (4th title)
- Runners-up: Scotland

Tournament statistics
- Matches played: 6
- Goals scored: 34 (5.67 per match)
- Top scorer: (Ireland) Olphie Stanfield (5 goals)

The 1890–91 British Home Championship was an international football tournament between the British Home Nations. Despite strong showings from all four teams, England eventually won the trophy with victories in all three games including, as at the 1890 and 1892 competitions, matches against Wales and Ireland played simultaneously. Ireland notched up one of their highest ever wins, 7–2 over Wales, but still only finished third, whilst the Welsh ran Scotland close in their encounter, but ultimately scored zero points.

Scotland and Ireland began the tournament with the Scots securing a narrow win in Glasgow. They extended their lead in Wrexham despite Wales playing well and nearly taking a draw, eventually going down 3–4. England then played their double on 7 March, scoring an aggregate of 10–2 as both the amateur and professional sides easily won their games over Wales and Ireland. Ireland and Wales played for pride in their final game, Ireland routing the Welsh in Belfast and finishing five goals ahead. In the tournament decider in Blackburn, England were too strong for the Scots in a close game and the result was an England victory, giving them the trophy undisputed.

== Table ==
Team	Pld	W	D	L	GF	GA	GD	Pts
England (C)	3	3	0	0	12	3	+9	6
Scotland	3	2	0	1	7	6	+1	4
Ireland	3	1	0	2	9	10	−1	2
Wales	3	0	0	3	6	15	−9	0

Rules for classification: 1) points. The points system worked as follows: 2 points for a win and 1 point for a draw.
(C) Champions

== Results ==
7 February 1891

Ireland	7–2	Wales
Dalton 19'; Stanfield 22', 34', 42', 80'; Gaffikin 60'; Torrans 63'		Roberts 10'; Davies 37'

Ulsterville, Belfast
Attendance: 12,000
Referee: Robert F. Harrison (Scotland)

7 March 1891

England	6–1	Ireland
Lindley; Bassett; Cotterill; Henfrey; Daft		Whiteside

Molineux, Wolverhampton
Attendance: 15,231
Referee: Richard Gough (Wales)

7 March 1891

England	4–1	Wales
Goodall; Southworth; Chadwick; Milward		Howell

Newcastle Road, Sunderland
Attendance: 15,000
Referee: Thomas Park (Scotland)

21 March 1891

Wales	3–4	Scotland
Bowdler 12', ?'; Owen 45'; Turner		Logan 5'; Buchanan 50'; Boyd 60', 80'

Racecourse Ground, Wrexham
Attendance: 4,000
Referee: Charles Crump (England)

28 March 1891

Scotland	2–1	Ireland
Low 6'; Waddell 60'		Stanfield 70'

Celtic Park, Glasgow
Attendance: 8,000
Referee: William H. Stacey (England)

4 April 1891

England	2–1	Scotland
Goodall 20'; Chadwick 30'		Watt 85'

Ewood Park, Blackburn
Attendance: 12,000
Referee: William J. Morrow (Ireland)

== Winning squad ==
- England

Name	Apps/Goals by opponent			Total	
Name	(Wales) WAL	(Ireland) IRE	(Scotland) SCO	Apps	Goals
Edgar Chadwick	1/1		1/1	2	2
John Goodall	1/1		1/1	2	2
Billy Bassett		1/1	1	2	1
Alfred Milward	1/1		1	2	1
Johnny Holt	1		1	2	0
Alfred Shelton	1		1	2	0
Albert Smith	1		1	2	0
Tinsley Lindley		1/2		1	2
George Cotterill		1/1		1	1
Harry Daft		1/1		1	1
Arthur Henfrey		1/1		1	1
Jack Southworth	1/1			1	1
Fred Geary			1	1	0
Bob Holmes			1	1	0
Bob Howarth			1	1	0
Billy Moon			1	1	0
Jem Bayliss		1		1	0
John Brodie		1		1	0
Joseph Marsden		1		1	0
Charlie Perry		1		1	0
William Rose		1		1	0
Alf Underwood		1		1	0
George Brann	1			1	0
Elphinstone Jackson	1			1	0
Tom Porteous	1			1	0
Leonard Wilkinson	1			1	0
