= William Turner (footballer, born 1867) =

Welsh footballer

Personal information
- Full name: William Haighton Turner
- Date of birth: 1867
- Date of death: 9 May, 1955
- Place of death: South Africa
- Position: Forward

Senior career*
| Years | Team | Apps | (Gls) |
| 1886–1892 | Wrexham | 41 | (25) |

International career
| 1887–1891 | Wales | 5 | (0) |
- * Club domestic league appearances and goals

William Haighton Turner (born 1867) was a Welsh footballer who played as a forward and made five appearances for the Wales national team.

== Career ==
Turner made his international debut for Wales on 26 February 1887 in the 1886–87 British Home Championship against England, which finished as a 0–4 away loss. He earned five caps in total for Wales, with his last appearance coming on 21 March 1891 in the 1890–91 British Home Championship against Scotland, which finished as a 3–4 home loss.

== Career statistics ==
=== International ===
Wales
| Year | Apps | Goals |
|---|---|---|
| 1887 | 2 | 0 |
| 1890 | 1 | 0 |
| 1891 | 2 | 0 |
| Total | 5 | 0 |
