= Billy Crone =

Irish footballer and manager

Personal information
- Full name: William Crone
- Date of birth: 31 August 1863
- Place of birth: Belfast, Ireland
- Date of death: 8 November 1944 (aged 81)
- Position: Defender

Senior career*
Years	Team	Apps	(Gls)
1881–1893	Distillery	290	(0)

International career
1882–1890	Ireland	12	(1)

Managerial career
- 1896–19xx: Distillery
- 1897: Ireland
- * Club domestic league appearances and goals

Billy Crone (31 August 1863 – 8 November 1944) also referred to as William Crone was an Irish footballer who played for Distillery and Ireland during the 1880s and 1890s. After retiring as a player he also coached both Distillery and Ireland. On 20 February 1897 he became the first coach in the history of modern football to take charge of a national team. Crone's younger brother Bob Crone was also a notable footballer, playing for Glentoran, Middlesbrough, West Bromwich Albion and Notts County, as well as Distillery and Ireland. Crone, an all-round athletic, was also a useful cricketer and distance runner.

== Playing career ==
=== Distillery ===
Crone spent sixteen seasons at Distillery playing as a defender. His club teammates included fellow Irish internationals Olphert Stanfield, Jack Reynolds and Samuel Johnston. Crone could play anywhere across the back-line, but was most familiar as a left-back or left-half. He made 290 appearances for Distillery and helped the club win the Irish Cup four times. He also played for Distillery during the inaugural Irish League season of 1890-91 and went on to make 35 league appearances for the club before he retired in 1893.

=== Irish International ===
Between 1882 and 1890 Crone also played 12 times for Ireland. He made his debut on 25 February 1882, while still in his teens, in a 7–1 defeat to Wales. This was only Ireland's second ever international. He remained a regular for Ireland throughout the following eight seasons. On 7 April 1888 he scored for Ireland in a 5–1 defeat to England. All of his 12 international appearances ended in defeat, a statistic which results in Crone holding the unfortunate record of finishing on the losing side more times than any other international player during the 1800s.

== Coaching career ==
After retiring as a player, Crone became a coach at Distillery, a post he held for fifteen seasons. On 20 February 1897 he also took charge of the Ireland team for the 6–0 defeat against England. This was the first time in the history of modern football that a coach took charge of a national team.

== Honours ==
Distillery

- Irish Cup
  - Winner 1883–84, 1884–85, 1885–86, 1888-89: 4
  - Runner Up 1887–88: 1
- County Antrim Shield
  - Winner 1888–89: 1
  - Runner Up 1889–90: 1
- Belfast Charities Cup
  - Runner Up 1883–84, 1889–90, 1891–92, 1892–93: 4
