= Northern Ireland national football team results (1980–1999) =

- Win Draw Loss

This article lists the results for the Northern Ireland national football team between 1980 and 1999.

== 1980s ==
=== 1980 ===
26 March 1980 1982 FIFA World Cup Group 6 Qualifier	Israel	0–0	Northern Ireland	Ramat Gan, Israel
Match 332		Report		Stadium: Ramat Gan Stadium; Attendance: 36,000; Referee: Stjepan Glavina (Yugoslavia)

16 May 1980 1979–80 British Home Championship	Northern Ireland	1–0	Scotland	Belfast, Northern Ireland
Match 333	Hamilton 36'	Report		Stadium: Windsor Park; Attendance: 18,000; Referee: Clive Thomas (Wales)

20 May 1980 1979–80 British Home Championship	England	1–1	Northern Ireland	London, England
Match 334	Brotherston 81' (o.g.)	Report	Cochrane 83'	Stadium: Wembley Stadium; Attendance: 33,676; Referee: Gwyn Owen (Wales)

23 May 1980 1979–80 British Home Championship	Wales	0–1	Northern Ireland	Cardiff, Wales
Match 335		Report	Brotherston 22'	Stadium: Ninian Park; Attendance: 12,913; Referee: John Hunting (England)

11 June 1980 International Friendly	Australia	1–2	Northern Ireland	Sydney, Australia
Match 336	Sharne 75'	Report	Nicholl 11'; J. O'Neill 52'	Stadium: Sydney Cricket Ground; Attendance: 12,486; Referee: Peter Rampley (Australia)

15 June 1980 International Friendly	Australia	1–1	Northern Ireland	Melbourne, Australia
Match 337	Sharne 18'	Report	M. O'Neill 82'	Stadium: Olympic Park Stadium; Attendance: 6,000; Referee: Stewart Mellings (Australia)

18 June 1980 International Friendly	Australia	1–2	Northern Ireland	Adelaide, Australia
Match 338	Sharne 5'	Report	Brotherston 70'; McCurdy 77'	Stadium: Hindmarsh Stadium; Attendance: 6,000; Referee: Don Campbell (Australia)

15 October 1980 1982 FIFA World Cup Group 6 Qualifier	Northern Ireland	3–0	Sweden	Belfast, Northern Ireland
Match 339	Brotherston 24'; McIlroy 28'; J. Nicholl 37'	Report		Stadium: Windsor Park; Attendance: 20,000; Referee: Alexis Ponnet (Belgium)

19 November 1980 1982 FIFA World Cup Group 6 Qualifier	Portugal	1–0	Northern Ireland	Lisbon, Portugal
Match 340	Jordão 60'	Report		Stadium: Estádio da Luz; Attendance: 60,000; Referee: Georges Konrath (France)

=== 1981 ===
25 March 1981 1982 FIFA World Cup Group 6 Qualifier	Scotland	1–1	Northern Ireland	Glasgow, Scotland
Match 341	Wark 75'	Report	Hamilton 70'	Stadium: Hampden Park; Attendance: 78,376; Referee: Klaus Scheurell (East Germany)

29 April 1981 1982 FIFA World Cup Group 6 Qualifier	Northern Ireland	1–0	Portugal	Belfast, Northern Ireland
Match 342	Armstrong 74'	Report		Stadium: Windsor Park; Attendance: 18,000; Referee: Svein-Inge Thime (Norway)

19 May 1981 1980–81 British Home Championship	Scotland	2–0	Northern Ireland	Glasgow, Scotland
Match 343	Stewart 5'; Archibald 49'	Report		Stadium: Hampden Park; Attendance: 22,431; Referee: Pat Partridge (England)

3 June 1981 1982 FIFA World Cup Group 6 Qualifier	Sweden	1–0	Northern Ireland	Stockholm, Sweden
Match 344	Borg 50' (pen.)	Report		Stadium: Råsunda Stadium; Attendance: 21,431; Referee: Paolo Bergamo (Italy)

14 October 1981 1982 FIFA World Cup Group 6 Qualifier	Northern Ireland	0–0	Scotland	Belfast, Northern Ireland
Match 345		Report		Stadium: Windsor Park; Attendance: 22,248; Referee: Valeri Butenko (Soviet Union)

18 November 1981 1982 FIFA World Cup Group 6 Qualifier	Northern Ireland	1–0	Israel	Belfast, Northern Ireland
Match 346	Armstrong 27'	Report		Stadium: Windsor Park; Attendance: 38,000; Referee: Emilio Guruceta Muro (Spain)

=== 1982 ===
23 February 1982 1981–82 British Home Championship	England	4–0	Northern Ireland	London, England
Match 347	Robson 1'; Keegan 56'; Wilkins 85'; Hoddle 89'	Report		Stadium: Wembley Stadium; Attendance: 54,900; Referee: Gwyn Owen (Wales)

24 March 1982 International Friendly	France	4–0	Northern Ireland	Paris, France
Match 348	Zénier 31'; Couriol 45'; Larios 57'; Genghini 80'	Report		Stadium: Parc des Princes; Attendance: 34,000; Referee: Roger Verhaeghe (Spain)

28 April 1982 1981–82 British Home Championship	Northern Ireland	1–1	Scotland	Belfast, Northern Ireland
Match 349	McIlroy 52'	Report	Wark 32'	Stadium: Windsor Park; Attendance: 20,000; Referee: John Hunting (England)

27 May 1982 1981–82 British Home Championship	Wales	3–0	Northern Ireland	Wrexham, Wales
Match 350	Curtis 18'; Rush 64'; Nicholas 75'	Report		Stadium: Racecourse Ground; Attendance: 2,315; Referee: George Smith (Scotland)

17 June 1982 1982 FIFA World Cup Group 5	Yugoslavia	0–0	Northern Ireland	Zaragoza, Spain
Match 351		Report		Stadium: La Romareda; Attendance: 25,000; Referee: Erik Fredriksson (Sweden)

21 June 1982 1982 FIFA World Cup Group 5	Honduras	1–1	Northern Ireland	Zaragoza, Spain
Match 352	Laing 60'	Report	Armstrong 10'	Stadium: La Romareda; Attendance: 15,000; Referee: Thomson Chan Tam-Sun (Hong Kong)

25 June 1982 1982 FIFA World Cup Group 5	Spain	0–1	Northern Ireland	Valencia, Spain
Match 353		Report	Armstrong 47'	Stadium: Estadio Luis Casanova; Attendance: 49,562; Referee: Héctor Ortiz (Paraguay)

1 July 1982 1982 FIFA World Cup Second Stage - Group D	Austria	2–2	Northern Ireland	Madrid, Spain
Match 354	Pezzey 50'; Hintermaier 68'	Report	Hamilton 27', 75'	Stadium: Estadio Vicente Calderón; Attendance: 20,000; Referee: Adolf Prokop (East Germany)

4 July 1982 1982 FIFA World Cup Second Stage - Group D	France	4–1	Northern Ireland	Madrid, Spain
Match 355	Giresse 33', 80'; Rocheteau 46', 68'	Report	Armstrong 75'	Stadium: Estadio Vicente Calderón; Attendance: 37,000; Referee: Alojzy Jarguz (Poland)

13 October 1982 UEFA Euro 1984 Group 6 Qualifier	Austria	2–0	Northern Ireland	Vienna, Austria
Match 356	Schachner 3', 39'	Report		Stadium: Praterstadion; Attendance: 9,885; Referee: Valeri Butenko (Soviet Union)

17 November 1982 UEFA Euro 1984 Group 6 Qualifier	Northern Ireland	1–0	West Germany	Belfast, Northern Ireland
Match 357	Stewart 18'	Report		Stadium: Windsor Park; Attendance: 15,000; Referee: Rolf Nyhus (Norway)

15 December 1982 UEFA Euro 1984 Group 6 Qualifier	Albania	0–0	Northern Ireland	Tirana, Albania
Match 358		Report		Stadium: Qemal Stafa; Attendance: 25,000; Referee: André Daina (Switzerland)

=== 1983 ===
30 March 1983 UEFA Euro 1984 Group 6 Qualifier	Northern Ireland	2–1	Turkey	Belfast, Northern Ireland
Match 359	M. O'Neill 5'; McClelland 18'	Report	Şengün 55'	Stadium: Windsor Park; Attendance: 20,000; Referee: Alain Delmer (France)

27 April 1983 UEFA Euro 1984 Group 6 Qualifier	Northern Ireland	1–0	Albania	Belfast, Northern Ireland
Match 360	Stewart 54'	Report		Stadium: Windsor Park; Attendance: 12,000; Referee: Ib Nielsen (Denmark)

24 May 1983 1982–83 British Home Championship	Scotland	0–0	Northern Ireland	Glasgow, Scotland
Match 361		Report		Stadium: Hampden Park; Attendance: 16,379; Referee: Keith Hackett (England)

28 May 1983 1982–83 British Home Championship	Northern Ireland	0–0	England	Belfast, Northern Ireland
Match 362		Report		Stadium: Windsor Park; Attendance: 16,238; Referee: Howard King (Wales)

31 May 1983 1982–83 British Home Championship	Northern Ireland	0–1	Wales	Belfast, Northern Ireland
Match 363		Report	Davies 64'	Stadium: Windsor Park; Attendance: 8,000; Referee: Hugh Alexander (Scotland)

21 September 1983 UEFA Euro 1984 Group 6 Qualifier	Northern Ireland	3–1	Austria	Belfast, Northern Ireland
Match 364	Hamilton 28'; Whiteside 67'; M. O'Neill 89'	Report	Gasselich 83'	Stadium: Windsor Park; Attendance: 18,013; Referee: Erik Fredriksson (Sweden)

12 October 1983 UEFA Euro 1984 Group 6 Qualifier	Turkey	1–0	Northern Ireland	Ankara, Turkey
Match 365	Terim 17'	Report		Stadium: 19 Mayıs Stadium; Attendance: 21,096; Referee: Romualdas Yushka (Soviet Union)

16 November 1983 UEFA Euro 1984 Group 6 Qualifier	West Germany	0–1	Northern Ireland	Hamburg, Germany
Match 366		Report	Whiteside 50'	Stadium: Volksparkstadion; Attendance: 61,418; Referee: Károly Palotai (Hungary)

13 December 1983 1983–84 British Home Championship	Northern Ireland	2–0	Scotland	Belfast, Northern Ireland
Match 367	Whiteside 17'; McIlroy 56'	Report		Stadium: Windsor Park; Attendance: 12,000; Referee: Neil Midgley (England)

=== 1984 ===
4 April 1984 1983–84 British Home Championship	England	1–0	Northern Ireland	London, England
Match 368	Woodcock 49'	Report		Stadium: Wembley Stadium; Attendance: 24,000; Referee: Ronald Bridges (Wales)

22 May 1984 1983–84 British Home Championship	Wales	1–1	Northern Ireland	Swansea, Wales
Match 369	Hughes 51'	Report	Armstrong 73'	Stadium: Vetch Field; Attendance: 7,845; Referee: Brian McGinlay (Scotland)

27 May 1984 1986 FIFA World Cup Group 3 Qualifier	Finland	1–0	Northern Ireland	Pori, Finland
Match 370	Valvee 55'	Report		Stadium: Porin Stadion, Pori; Attendance: 8,155; Referee: Karl-Heinz Tritschler (West Germany)

12 September 1984 1986 FIFA World Cup Group 3 Qualifier	Northern Ireland	3–2	Romania	Belfast, Northern Ireland
Match 371	Iorgulescu 34' (o.g.); Whiteside 61'; M. O'Neill 73'	Report	Hagi 36'; Geolgău 80'	Stadium: Windsor Park; Attendance: 17,269; Referee: Alexis Ponnet (Belgium)

16 October 1984 International Friendly	Northern Ireland	3–0	Israel	Belfast, Northern Ireland
Match 372	Whiteside 3'; Quinn 26'; Doherty 44'	Report		Stadium: Windsor Park; Attendance: 10,000; Referee: Howard King (Wales)

14 November 1984 1986 FIFA World Cup Group 3 Qualifier	Northern Ireland	2–1	Finland	Belfast, Northern Ireland
Match 373	J. O'Neill 44'; Armstrong 51' (pen.)	Report	Lipponen 22'	Stadium: Windsor Park; Attendance: 19,457; Referee: Santos Da Silva (Portugal)

=== 1985 ===
27 February 1985 1986 FIFA World Cup Group 3 Qualifier	Northern Ireland	0–1	England	Belfast, Northern Ireland
Match 374		Report	Hateley 77'	Stadium: Windsor Park; Attendance: 28,500; Referee: Volker Roth (West Germany)

27 March 1985 International Friendly	Spain	0–0	Northern Ireland	Palma de Mallorca, Spain
Match 375		Report		Stadium: Estadio Lluís Sitjar; Attendance: 30,000; Referee: Coşkun Kutay (Turkey)

1 May 1985 1986 FIFA World Cup Group 3 Qualifier	Northern Ireland	2–0	Turkey	Belfast, Northern Ireland
Match 376	Whiteside 4', 54'	Report		Stadium: Windsor Park; Attendance: 18,000; Referee: Bruno Galler (Switzerland)

11 September 1985 1986 FIFA World Cup Group 3 Qualifier	Turkey	0–0	Northern Ireland	İzmir, Turkey
Match 377		Report		Stadium: İzmir Atatürk Stadium; Attendance: 39,157; Referee: Michel Vautrot (France)

16 October 1985 1986 FIFA World Cup Group 3 Qualifier	Romania	0–1	Northern Ireland	Bucharest, Romania
Match 378		Report	Quinn 29'	Stadium: Stadionul 23. August; Attendance: 35,000; Referee: Henning Lund-Sørensen (Denmark)

12 November 1985 1986 FIFA World Cup Group 3 Qualifier	England	0–0	Northern Ireland	London, England
Match 379		Report		Stadium: Wembley Stadium; Attendance: 70,500; Referee: Erik Fredriksson (Sweden)

=== 1986 ===
26 February 1986 International Friendly	France	0–0	Northern Ireland	Paris, France
Match 380		Report		Stadium: Parc des Princes; Attendance: 28,909; Referee: Alphonse Costantin (Belgium)

26 March 1986 International Friendly	Northern Ireland	1–1	Denmark	Belfast, Northern Ireland
Match 381	McDonald 39'	Report	Christensen 79'	Stadium: Windsor Park; Attendance: 20,000; Referee: Rodger Gifford (Wales)

23 April 1986 International Friendly	Northern Ireland	2–1	Morocco	Belfast, Northern Ireland
Match 382	Clarke 13'; Quinn 86'	Report	Timoumi 65' (pen.)	Stadium: Windsor Park; Attendance: 12,000; Referee: Keith Cooper (Wales)

3 June 1986 1986 FIFA World Cup Group D	Algeria	1–1	Northern Ireland	Guadalajara, Mexico
Match 383	Zidane 59'	Report	Whiteside 6'	Stadium: Estadio Tres de Marzo; Attendance: 22,000; Referee: Valeri Butenko (Soviet Union)

7 June 1986 1986 FIFA World Cup Group D	Northern Ireland	1–2	Spain	Guadalajara, Mexico
Match 384	Clarke 46'	Report	Butragueño 1'; Salinas 18'	Stadium: Estadio Tres de Marzo; Attendance: 28,000; Referee: Horst Brummeier (Austria)

12 June 1986 1986 FIFA World Cup Group D	Northern Ireland	0–3	Brazil	Guadalajara, Mexico
Match 385		Report	Careca 15', 87'; Josimar 42'	Stadium: Estadio Jalisco; Attendance: 51,000; Referee: Siegfried Kirschen (East Germany)

15 October 1986 UEFA Euro 1988 Group 4 Qualifier	England	3–0	Northern Ireland	London, England
Match 386	Lineker 33', 80'; Waddle 75'	Report		Stadium: Wembley; Attendance: 35,304; Referee: Alphonse Costantin (Belgium)

12 November 1986 UEFA Euro 1988 Group 4 Qualifier	Turkey	0–0	Northern Ireland	İzmir, Turkey
Match 387		Report		Stadium: Alsancak Stadı; Attendance: 21,919; Referee: Ștefan Dan Petrescu (Romania)

=== 1987 ===
18 February 1987 International Friendly	Israel	1–1	Northern Ireland	Ramat Gan, Israel
Match 388	Merili 87'	Report	Penney 38'	Stadium: Ramat Gan Stadium; Attendance: 4,081; Referee: Tullio Lanese (Italy)

1 April 1987 UEFA Euro 1988 Group 4 Qualifier	Northern Ireland	0–2	England	Belfast, Northern Ireland
Match 389		Report	Hodge 19'; Waddle 42'	Stadium: Windsor Park; Attendance: 20,578; Referee: Emilio Soriano Aladrén (Spain)

29 April 1987 UEFA Euro 1988 Group 4 Qualifier	Northern Ireland	1–2	Yugoslavia	Belfast, Northern Ireland
Match 390	Clarke 40'	Report	Stojković 47'; Vujović 80'	Stadium: Windsor Park; Attendance: 5,482; Referee: Werner Föckler (West Germany)

14 October 1987 UEFA Euro 1988 Group 4 Qualifier	Yugoslavia	3–0	Northern Ireland	Sarajevo, Yugoslavia
Match 391	Vokrri 12', 34'; Hadžibegić 74' (pen.)	Report		Stadium: Stadion Grbavica; Attendance: 14,075; Referee: Klaus Peschel (West Germany)

11 November 1987 UEFA Euro 1988 Group 4 Qualifier	Northern Ireland	1–0	Turkey	Belfast, Northern Ireland
Match 392	Quinn 47'	Report		Stadium: Windsor Park; Attendance: 3,931; Referee: Peter Mikkelsen (Denmark)

=== 1988 ===
17 February 1988 International Friendly	Greece	3–2	Northern Ireland	Athens, Greece
Match 393	Manolas 61', 79'; Mitropoulos 89'	Report	Clarke 32', 76'	Stadium: Olympic Stadium; Attendance: 9,753; Referee: Zdravko Đokić (Yugoslavia)

23 March 1988 International Friendly	Northern Ireland	1–1	Poland	Belfast, Northern Ireland
Match 394	Wilson 2'	Report	Dziekanowski 32'	Stadium: Windsor Park; Attendance: 4,903; Referee: Rodger Gifford (Wales)

27 April 1988 International Friendly	Northern Ireland	0–0	France	Belfast, Northern Ireland
Match 395		Report		Stadium: Windsor Park; Attendance: 6,250; Referee: Keith Cooper (Wales)

21 May 1988 1990 FIFA World Cup Group 6 Qualifier	Northern Ireland	3–0	Malta	Belfast, Northern Ireland
Match 396	Quinn 14'; Penney 23'; Clarke 25'	Report		Stadium: Windsor Park; Attendance: 9,000; Referee: Carlos Silva Valente (Portugal)

14 September 1988 1990 FIFA World Cup Group 6 Qualifier	Northern Ireland	0–0	Republic of Ireland	Belfast, Northern Ireland
Match 397		Report		Stadium: Windsor Park; Attendance: 19,873; Referee: Michel Vautrot (France)

19 October 1988 1990 FIFA World Cup Group 6 Qualifier	Hungary	1–0	Northern Ireland	Budapest, Hungary
Match 398	Vincze 84'	Report		Stadium: Népstadion; Attendance: 18,000; Referee: Kurt Röthlisberger (Switzerland)

21 December 1988 1990 FIFA World Cup Group 6 Qualifier	Spain	4–0	Northern Ireland	Seville, Spain
Match 399	Rogan 30' (o.g.); Butragueño 55'; Míchel 60' (pen.); McDonald 64' (o.g.)	Report		Stadium: Estadio Ramón Sánchez Pizjuán; Attendance: 70,000; Referee: Marcel van Langenhove (Belgium)

=== 1989 ===
8 February 1989 1990 FIFA World Cup Group 6 Qualifier	Northern Ireland	0–2	Spain	Belfast, Northern Ireland
Match 400		Report	Andrinúa 3'; Manolo 84'	Stadium: Windsor Park; Attendance: 15,000; Referee: Dieter Pauly (West Germany)

26 April 1989 1990 FIFA World Cup Group 6 Qualifier	Malta	0–2	Northern Ireland	Attard, Malta
Match 401		Report	Clarke 55'; O'Neill 73'	Stadium: Ta' Qali National Stadium; Attendance: 15,150; Referee: Ștefan Dan Petrescu (Romania)

26 May 1989 International Friendly	Northern Ireland	0–1	Chile	Belfast, Northern Ireland
Match 402		Report	Astengo 44'	Stadium: Windsor Park; Attendance: 2,500; Referee: George Smith (Scotland)

6 September 1989 1990 FIFA World Cup Group 6 Qualifier	Northern Ireland	1–2	Hungary	Belfast, Northern Ireland
Match 403	Whiteside 89'	Report	Kovács 13'; Bognár 44'	Stadium: Windsor Park; Attendance: 8,000; Referee: Erik Fredriksson (Sweden)

11 October 1989 1990 FIFA World Cup Group 6 Qualifier	Republic of Ireland	3–0	Northern Ireland	Dublin, Republic of Ireland
Match 404	Whelan 42'; Cascarino 48'; Houghton 57'	Report		Stadium: Lansdowne Road; Attendance: 45,800; Referee: Pietro D'Elia (Italy)

== 1990s ==
=== 1990 ===
27 March 1990 International Friendly	Northern Ireland	2–3	Norway	Belfast, Northern Ireland
Match 405	Quinn 44'; Wilson 86'	Report	Skammelsrud 54'; Andersen 57'; Johnsen 90'	Stadium: Windsor Park; Attendance: 3,900; Referee: Howard King (Wales)

18 May 1990 International Friendly	Northern Ireland	1–0	Uruguay	Belfast, Northern Ireland
Match 406	Wilson 39'	Report		Stadium: Windsor Park; Attendance: 3,500; Referee: Keith Cooper (Wales)

12 September 1990 UEFA Euro 1992 Group 4 Qualifier	Northern Ireland	0–2	Yugoslavia	Belfast, Northern Ireland
Match 407		Report	Pančev 36'; Prosinečki 86'	Stadium: Windsor Park; Attendance: 9,008; Referee: Jaap Uilenberg (Netherlands)

17 October 1990 UEFA Euro 1992 Group 4 Qualifier	Northern Ireland	1–1	Denmark	Belfast, Northern Ireland
Match 408	Clarke 58'	Report	Bartram 11' (pen.)	Stadium: Windsor Park; Attendance: 9,079; Referee: Roger Philippi (Luxembourg)

14 November 1990 UEFA Euro 1992 Group 4 Qualifier	Austria	0–0	Northern Ireland	Vienna, Austria
Match 409		Report		Stadium: Praterstadion; Attendance: 6,753; Referee: Gérard Biguet (France)

=== 1991 ===
5 February 1991 International Friendly	Northern Ireland	3–1	Poland	Belfast, Northern Ireland
Match 410	Taggart 44', 62'; Magilton 51' (pen.)	Report	Warzycha 17'	Stadium: Windsor Park; Attendance: 3,500; Referee: Keith Burge (Wales)

27 March 1991 UEFA Euro 1992 Group 4 Qualifier	Yugoslavia	4–1	Northern Ireland	Belgrade, Yugoslavia
Match 411	Binić 35'; Pančev 47', 60', 62'	Report	Hill 44'	Stadium: Red Star Stadium; Attendance: 5,086; Referee: Yusuf Namoğlu (Turkey)

1 May 1991 UEFA Euro 1992 Group 4 Qualifier	Northern Ireland	1–1	Faroe Islands	Belfast, Northern Ireland
Match 412	Clarke 45'	Report	Reynheim 63'	Stadium: Windsor Park; Attendance: 7,253; Referee: Michel Piraux (Belgium)

11 September 1991 UEFA Euro 1992 Group 4 Qualifier	Faroe Islands	0–5	Northern Ireland	Landskrona, Sweden (Note: Match played in Sweden as the Faroe Islands did not have a UEFA-approved grass pitch arena.)
Match 413		Report	Wilson 8'; Clarke 12', 51', 68' (pen.); McDonald 14'	Stadium: Landskrona IP; Attendance: 1,623; Referee: Simo Ruokonen (Finland)

16 October 1991 UEFA Euro 1992 Group 4 Qualifier	Northern Ireland	2–1	Austria	Belfast, Northern Ireland
Match 414	Dowie 18'; Black 42'	Report	Lainer 44'	Stadium: Windsor Park; Attendance: 6,854; Referee: Leif Sundell (Sweden)

13 November 1991 UEFA Euro 1992 Group 4 Qualifier	Denmark	2–1	Northern Ireland	Odense, Denmark
Match 415	Povlsen 22', 36'	Report	Taggart 71'	Stadium: Odense Stadium; Attendance: 10,881; Referee: Alexey Spirin (Soviet Union)

=== 1992 ===
19 February 1992 International Friendly	Scotland	1–0	Northern Ireland	Glasgow, Scotland
Match 416	McCoist 11'	Report		Stadium: Hampden Park; Attendance: 13,650; Referee: Joe Worrall (England)

28 April 1992 1994 FIFA World Cup Group 3 Qualifier	Northern Ireland	2–2	Lithuania	Belfast, Northern Ireland
Match 417	Wilson 13'; Taggart 16'	Report	Narbekovas 41'; Fridrikas 48'	Stadium: Windsor Park; Attendance: 4,500; Referee: Rune Pedersen (Norway)

2 June 1992 International Friendly	Germany	1–1	Northern Ireland	Bremen, Germany
Match 418	Binz 40'	Report	Hughes 22'	Stadium: Weserstadion; Attendance: 24,000; Referee: Alphonse Costantin (Belgium)

9 September 1992 1994 FIFA World Cup Group 3 Qualifier	Northern Ireland	3–0	Albania	Belfast, Northern Ireland
Match 419	Clarke 14'; Wilson 31'; Magilton 44'	Report		Stadium: Windsor Park; Attendance: 4,756; Referee: Marnix Sandra (Belgium)

14 October 1992 1994 FIFA World Cup Group 3 Qualifier	Northern Ireland	0–0	Spain	Belfast, Northern Ireland
Match 420		Report		Stadium: Windsor Park; Attendance: 10,343; Referee: Hellmut Krug (Germany)

18 November 1992 1994 FIFA World Cup Group 3 Qualifier	Northern Ireland	0–1	Denmark	Belfast, Northern Ireland
Match 421		Report	H. Larsen 51'	Stadium: Windsor Park; Attendance: 11,000; Referee: Sándor Puhl (Hungary)

=== 1993 ===
17 February 1993 1994 FIFA World Cup Group 3 Qualifier	Albania	1–2	Northern Ireland	Tirana, Albania
Match 422	Rraklli 90'	Report	Magilton 15'; McDonald 41'	Stadium: Qemal Stafa Stadium; Attendance: 17,000; Referee: Vesselin Bogdanov (Bulgaria)

31 March 1993 1994 FIFA World Cup Group 3 Qualifier	Republic of Ireland	3–0	Northern Ireland	Dublin, Republic of Ireland
Match 423	Townsend 20'; Quinn 22'; Staunton 28'	Report		Stadium: Lansdowne Road; Attendance: 33,000; Referee: Kurt Röthlisberger (Switzerland)

28 April 1993 1994 FIFA World Cup Group 3 Qualifier	Spain	3–1	Northern Ireland	Seville, Spain
Match 424	J. Salinas 21', 26'; Hierro 41'	Report	Wilson 11'	Stadium: Benito Villamarín; Attendance: 20,000; Referee: Leif Sundell (Sweden)

25 May 1993 1994 FIFA World Cup Group 3 Qualifier	Lithuania	0–1	Northern Ireland	Vilnius, Lithuania
Match 425		Report	Dowie 8'	Stadium: Žalgiris Stadium; Attendance: 6,500; Referee: Esa Palsi (Finland)

2 June 1993 1994 FIFA World Cup Group 3 Qualifier	Latvia	1–2	Northern Ireland	Riga, Latvia
Match 426	Linards 55'	Report	Magilton 4'; Taggart 15'	Stadium: Daugava Stadium; Attendance: 2,764; Referee: Piotr Werner (Poland)

8 September 1993 1994 FIFA World Cup Group 3 Qualifier	Northern Ireland	2–0	Latvia	Belfast, Northern Ireland
Match 427	Quinn 35'; Gray 80'	Report		Stadium: Windsor Park; Attendance: 6,400; Referee: João Pinto Correia (Portugal)

13 October 1993 1994 FIFA World Cup Group 3 Qualifier	Denmark	1–0	Northern Ireland	Copenhagen, Denmark
Match 428	B. Laudrup 83'	Report		Stadium: Parken; Attendance: 40,242; Referee: Vadim Zhuk (Belarus)

17 November 1993 1994 FIFA World Cup Group 3 Qualifier	Northern Ireland	1–1	Republic of Ireland	Belfast, Northern Ireland
Match 429	Quinn 74'	Report	McLoughlin 78'	Stadium: Windsor Park; Attendance: 10,500; Referee: Ahmet Çakar (Turkey)

=== 1994 ===
23 March 1994 International Friendly	Northern Ireland	2–0	Romania	Belfast, Northern Ireland
Match 430	Morrow 42'; Gray 50'	Report		Stadium: Windsor Park; Attendance: 15,000; Referee: Keith Burge (Wales)

20 April 1994 UEFA Euro 1996 Group 6 Qualifier	Northern Ireland	4–1	Liechtenstein	Belfast, Northern Ireland
Match 431	Quinn 5', 34'; Lomas 25'; Dowie 48'	Report	Hasler 84'	Stadium: Windsor Park; Attendance: 7,150; Referee: Roelof Luinge (Netherlands)

4 June 1994 International Friendly	Colombia	2–0	Northern Ireland	Foxborough, United States
Match 432	Pérez 29'; Valencia 45'	Report		Stadium: Foxboro Stadium; Attendance: 21,153; Referee: Jack D'Aquila (United States)

11 June 1994 International Friendly	Mexico	3–0	Northern Ireland	Miami, United States
Match 433	Postigo 18', 30'; Hermosillo 77'	Report		Stadium: Miami Orange Bowl; Attendance: 8,418; Referee: Hélder Dias (United States)

7 September 1994 UEFA Euro 1996 Group 6 Qualifier	Northern Ireland	1–2	Portugal	Belfast, Northern Ireland
Match 434	Quinn 58' (pen.)	Report	Rui Costa 8'; Domingos 81'	Stadium: Windsor Park; Attendance: 6,301; Referee: Rune Pedersen (Norway)

12 October 1994 UEFA Euro 1996 Group 6 Qualifier	Austria	1–2	Northern Ireland	Vienna, Austria
Match 435	Polster 24' (pen.)	Report	Gillespie 3'; Gray 36'	Stadium: Ernst Happel Stadion; Attendance: 19,742; Referee: Antonio Jesús Lõpez Nieto (Spain)

16 November 1994 UEFA Euro 1996 Group 6 Qualifier	Northern Ireland	0–4	Republic of Ireland	Belfast, Northern Ireland
Match 436		Report	Aldridge 6'; Keane 11'; Sheridan 38'; Townsend 54'	Stadium: Windsor Park; Attendance: 10,336; Referee: Serge Muhmenthaler (Switzerland)

=== 1995 ===
29 March 1995 UEFA Euro 1996 Group 6 Qualifier	Republic of Ireland	1–1	Northern Ireland	Dublin, Republic of Ireland
Match 437	Quinn 47'	Report	Dowie 72'	Stadium: Lansdowne Road; Attendance: 32,200; Referee: Mario van der Ende (Netherlands)

26 April 1995 UEFA Euro 1996 Group 6 Qualifier	Latvia	0–1	Northern Ireland	Riga, Latvia
Match 438		Report	Dowie 70' (pen.)	Stadium: Daugava Stadium; Attendance: 1,560; Referee: Finn Lambeck (Denmark)

22 May 1995 Canada Cup	Canada	2–0	Northern Ireland	Edmonton, Canada
Match 439	Peschisolido 9', 23'	Report		Stadium: Commonwealth Stadium; Attendance: 12,112; Referee: Brian Hall (United States)

25 May 1995 Canada Cup	Chile	2–1	Northern Ireland	Edmonton, Canada
Match 440	Valencia 74'; Mardones 81'	Report	Dowie 7'	Stadium: Commonwealth Stadium; Attendance: 6,124; Referee: Mike Seiffert (Canada)

7 June 1995 UEFA Euro 1996 Group 6 Qualifier	Northern Ireland	1–2	Latvia	Belfast, Northern Ireland
Match 441	Dowie 44'	Report	Zeiberliņš 59'; Astafjevs 62'	Stadium: Windsor Park; Attendance: 6,935; Referee: Juan Ansuátegui Roca (Spain)

3 September 1995 UEFA Euro 1996 Group 6 Qualifier	Portugal	1–1	Northern Ireland	Porto, Portugal
Match 442	Domingos 47'	Report	Hughes 66'	Stadium: Estádio das Antas; Attendance: 26,780; Referee: Rémi Harrel (France)

11 October 1995 UEFA Euro 1996 Group 6 Qualifier	Liechtenstein	0–4	Northern Ireland	Eschen, Liechtenstein
Match 443		Report	O'Neill 36'; McMahon 49'; Quinn 55'; Gray 72'	Stadium: Sportpark; Attendance: 1,200; Referee: Ľuboš Micheľ (Slovakia)

15 November 1995 UEFA Euro 1996 Group 6 Qualifier	Northern Ireland	5–3	Austria	Belfast, Northern Ireland
Match 444	O'Neill 27', 78'; Dowie 32' (pen.); Hunter 53'; Gray 63'	Report	Schopp 55'; Stumpf 70'; Wetl 81'	Stadium: Windsor Park; Attendance: 8,451; Referee: Leif Sundell (Sweden)

=== 1996 ===
27 March 1996 International Friendly	Northern Ireland	0–2	Norway	Belfast, Northern Ireland
Match 445		Report	Solskjær 51'; Østenstad 83'	Stadium: Windsor Park; Attendance: 5,343; Referee: John Ashman (Wales)

24 April 1996 International Friendly	Northern Ireland	1–2	Sweden	Belfast, Northern Ireland
Match 446	McMahon 84'	Report	Dahlin 22'; Ingesson 58'	Stadium: Windsor Park; Attendance: 5,666; Referee: Hugh Dallas (Scotland)

29 May 1996 International Friendly	Northern Ireland	1–1	Germany	Belfast, Northern Ireland
Match 447	O'Boyle 76'	Report	Scholl 77'	Stadium: Windsor Park; Attendance: 11,700; Referee: Willie Young (Scotland)

31 August 1996 1998 FIFA World Cup Group 9 Qualifier	Northern Ireland	0–1	Ukraine	Belfast, Northern Ireland
Match 448		Report	Rebrov 79'	Stadium: Windsor Park; Attendance: 9,358; Referee: Alain Sars (France)

5 October 1996 1998 FIFA World Cup Group 9 Qualifier	Northern Ireland	1–1	Armenia	Belfast, Northern Ireland
Match 449	Lennon 29'	Report	Assadourian 8'	Stadium: Windsor Park; Attendance: 8,357; Referee: Krsto Danilovski (Macedonia)

9 November 1996 1998 FIFA World Cup Group 9 Qualifier	Germany	1–1	Northern Ireland	Nuremberg, Germany
Match 450	Möller 40'	Report	Taggart 38'	Stadium: Frankenstadion; Attendance: 40,718; Referee: Ahmet Çakar (Turkey)

14 December 1996 1998 FIFA World Cup Group 9 Qualifier	Northern Ireland	2–0	Albania	Belfast, Northern Ireland
Match 451	Dowie 12', 21'	Report		Stadium: Windsor Park; Attendance: 7,935; Referee: Andreas Georgiou (Cyprus)

=== 1997 ===
22 January 1997 International Friendly	Italy	2–0	Northern Ireland	Palermo, Italy
Match 452	Zola 9'; Del Piero 88'	Report		Stadium: Stadio La Favorita; Attendance: 30,866; Referee: Lutz Michael Fröhlich (Germany)

11 February 1997 International Friendly	Northern Ireland	3–0	Belgium	Belfast, Northern Ireland
Match 453	Quinn 14'; Magilton 62' (pen.); Mulryne 88'	Report		Stadium: Windsor Park; Attendance: 7,126; Referee: John Rowbotham (Scotland)

29 March 1997 1998 FIFA World Cup Group 9 Qualifier	Northern Ireland	0–0	Portugal	Belfast, Northern Ireland
Match 454		Report		Stadium: Windsor Park; Attendance: 9,400; Referee: Graziano Cesari (Italy)

2 April 1997 1998 FIFA World Cup Group 9 Qualifier	Ukraine	2–1	Northern Ireland	Kyiv, Ukraine
Match 455	Kosovskyi 3'; Shevchenko 70'	Report	Dowie 14' (pen.)	Stadium: Olimpiyskiy; Attendance: 85,000; Referee: Václav Krondl (Czech Republic)

30 April 1997 1998 FIFA World Cup Group 9 Qualifier	Armenia	0–0	Northern Ireland	Yerevan, Armenia
Match 456		Report		Stadium: Hrazdan Stadium; Attendance: 5,000; Referee: Karl-Erik Nilsson (Sweden)

21 May 1997 International Friendly	Thailand	0–0	Northern Ireland	Bangkok, Thailand
Match 457		Report		Stadium: Suphachalasai Stadium; Attendance: 15,000; Referee: Hanlumyaung Panya (Thailand)

20 August 1997 1998 FIFA World Cup Group 9 Qualifier	Northern Ireland	1–3	Germany	Belfast, Northern Ireland
Match 458	Hughes 59'	Report	Bierhoff 72', 77', 78'	Stadium: Windsor Park; Attendance: 12,037; Referee: José María García-Aranda (Spain)

10 September 1997 1998 FIFA World Cup Group 9 Qualifier	Albania	1–0	Northern Ireland	Zürich, Switzerland (Note: Played in neutral ground due to the 1997 rebellion in Albania.)
Match 459	Haxhi 65'	Report		Stadium: Hardturm; Attendance: 2,650; Referee: Roger Philippi (Luxembourg)

11 October 1997 1998 FIFA World Cup Group 9 Qualifier	Portugal	1–0	Northern Ireland	Lisbon, Portugal
Match 460	Conceição 18'	Report		Stadium: Estádio da Luz; Attendance: 31,847; Referee: Peter Mikkelsen (Denmark)

=== 1998 ===
25 March 1998 International Friendly	Northern Ireland	1–0	Slovakia	Belfast, Northern Ireland
Match 461	Lomas 51'	Report		Stadium: Windsor Park; Attendance: 7,895; Referee: Alan Howells (Wales)

22 April 1998 International Friendly	Northern Ireland	1–0	Switzerland	Belfast, Northern Ireland
Match 462	Patterson 10'	Report		Stadium: Windsor Park; Attendance: 8,862; Referee: Hugh Dallas (Scotland)

3 June 1998 International Friendly	Spain	4–1	Northern Ireland	Santander, Spain
Match 463	Pizzi 29', 37'; Morientes 47', 67'	Report	Taggart 43'	Stadium: Estadio El Sardinero; Attendance: 18,120; Referee: Gilles Veissière (France)

5 September 1998 UEFA Euro 2000 Group 3 Qualifier	Turkey	3–0	Northern Ireland	Istanbul, Turkey
Match 464	Oktay 18', 58'; Tayfur 50'	Report		Stadium: Ali Sami Yen Stadium; Attendance: 19,840; Referee: Ryszard Wójcik (Poland)

10 October 1998 UEFA Euro 2000 Group 3 Qualifier	Northern Ireland	1–0	Finland	Belfast, Northern Ireland
Match 465	Rowland 36'	Report		Stadium: Windsor Park; Attendance: 10,002; Referee: Zoran Arsić (Federal Republic of Yugoslavia)

18 November 1998 UEFA Euro 2000 Group 3 Qualifier	Northern Ireland	2–2	Moldova	Belfast, Northern Ireland
Match 466	Dowie 49'; Lennon 63'	Report	Gaidamașciuc 22'; Testemițanu 56'	Stadium: Windsor Park; Attendance: 11,137; Referee: Vladimír Hriňák (Slovakia)

=== 1999 ===
27 March 1999 UEFA Euro 2000 Group 3 Qualifier	Northern Ireland	0–3	Germany	Belfast, Northern Ireland
Match 467		Report	Bode 11', 43'; Morrow 62' (o.g.)	Stadium: Windsor Park; Attendance: 14,270; Referee: Graziano Cesari (Italy)

31 March 1999 UEFA Euro 2000 Group 3 Qualifier	Moldova	0–0	Northern Ireland	Chişinău, Moldova
Match 468		Report		Stadium: Stadionul Republican; Attendance: 9,237; Referee: Edo Trivković (Croatia)

27 April 1999 International Friendly	Northern Ireland	1–1	Canada	Belfast, Northern Ireland
Match 469	Parker 90+1' (o.g.)	Report	Bircham 67'	Stadium: Windsor Park; Attendance: 7,663; Referee: Mike McCurry (Scotland)

29 May 1999 International Friendly	Republic of Ireland	0–1	Northern Ireland	Dublin, Republic of Ireland
Match 470		Report	Griffin 84'	Stadium: Lansdowne Road; Attendance: 12,100; Referee: Ceri Richards (Wales)

18 August 1999 International Friendly	Northern Ireland	0–1	France	Belfast, Northern Ireland
Match 471		Report	Laslandes 67'	Stadium: Windsor Park; Attendance: 11,804; Referee: Willie Young (Scotland)

4 September 1999 UEFA Euro 2000 Group 3 Qualifier	Northern Ireland	0–3	Turkey	Belfast, Northern Ireland
Match 472		Report	Arif 45', 46', 48'	Stadium: Windsor Park; Attendance: 7,270; Referee: Alain Sars (France)

8 September 1999 UEFA Euro 2000 Group 3 Qualifier	Germany	4–0	Northern Ireland	Dortmund, Germany
Match 473	Bierhoff 2'; Ziege 16', 33', 45'	Report		Stadium: Westfalenstadion; Attendance: 41,000; Referee: Georgios Bikas (Greece)

9 October 1999 UEFA Euro 2000 Group 3 Qualifier	Finland	4–1	Northern Ireland	Helsinki, Finland
Match 474	Johansson 9'; Hyypiä 63'; Kolkka 73', 83'	Report	Whitley 59'	Stadium: Olympic Stadium; Attendance: 8,217; Referee: Armand Ancion (Belgium)
