= Robert Roberts (footballer, born 1865) =

Welsh footballer

Personal information
- Full name: Robert Roberts
- Date of birth: 1865
- Place of birth: Rhosllannerchrugog, Wales
- Date of death: 1 October 1945
- Place of death: Crewe, England
- Position: Outside left

Youth career
- 1877–c.1884: Rhosllannerchrugog

Senior career*
Years	Team	Apps	(Gls)
- Witton Britannia
c.1889–1891	Rhosllannerchrugog		
1891	West Bromwich Albion	1	(0)
1891–1892	Wrexham		
1892–1894	Crewe Alexandra	38	(17)

International career
1891–1893	Wales	2	(0)
- * Club domestic league appearances and goals

Robert Roberts (1865 – 1 October 1945) was a Welsh footballer who played at outside-left for several clubs, spending most of his career with Crewe Alexandra in the English Football League. He made two appearances for Wales.

== Football career ==
Roberts was born in Rhosllannerchrugog near Wrexham and was a member of the village football team by the time he was thirteen, going on to captain the side for four seasons.

Once he had completed his schooling, he became a teacher in Anglesey before moving to take up a post with Timberlane National School in Northwich, where he played for Witton Britannia, helping them reach the final of the Cheshire Junior Cup, where they lost to Crewe Hornets.

He returned to "Rhos" in the late 1880s and made his first appearance for Wales when he replaced Jack Bowdler against Ireland on 7 February 1891. The Welsh team were comprehensively defeated by a score of 7–2. Shortly after his international debut, Roberts was persuaded by Seth Powell to sign for West Bromwich Albion as an amateur.

Roberts made one appearance for West Bromwich in the 1890–91 season before returning to Wales in October 1891 to join Wrexham. By the end of the season he had become the Wrexham captain before a move back to the Football League to join Crewe Alexandra in 1892. At Crewe, he signed as a professional but reverted to amateur status when he was offered the position as accountant at Crewe railway station.

in 1892, the Football Association of Wales in the annual player assessment described Roberts as "a good outside left (who) passes well (but) requires the same partner regularly". Roberts was noted for his "dashes down the left wing and his good centres" as well as his "continual raids into the visitors' territory."

His second international appearance came on 13 March 1893 when he once more replaced Jack Bowdler against England. The match was played at nearby Stoke-upon-Trent and the Welsh were again defeated conceding six goals without reply.

In the league, Roberts made 38 appearances for Crewe over two seasons, scoring 17 goals, with the club finishing both years mid-table in the Second Division.

== Later career ==
Roberts retired in the summer of 1894 and later became a linesman in the Lancashire League, progressing to refereeing in the Football League in the early 20th century. He took charge of several important matches including the Welsh Cup Final in 1899.

Roberts later became a publican and also joined Crewe Alexandra as a committee member, and then became company secretary and then a director as the club became a limited company.

Roberts was a regular attender at the Welsh chapel in Crewe and was conductor of the chapel choir.

== International appearances ==
Roberts' two appearances for Wales were as follows:

Date	Venue	Opponent	Result	Goals	Competition
7 February 1891	Ulsterville, Belfast	Ireland	2–7	0	British Home Championship
13 March 1893	Victoria Ground, Stoke-upon-Trent	England	0–6	0	British Home Championship
