= William Boyd Dalton =

Irish association football player

William Dalton
Personal information
- Full name: William Boyd Dalton
- Date of birth: 16 March 1870
- Place of birth: Belfast, Ireland
- Date of death: 19 May 1946
- Place of death: Toronto, Canada
- Position: Forward

Senior career*
Years	Team	Apps	(Gls)
1887–1888	Belfast YMCA		
1890–1894	Linfield		

International career
1888-1894	Ireland Amateurs	11	(4)
- * Club domestic league appearances and goals

William Dalton (1870-1946) was an Irish footballer who played as a forward. He made his Ireland debut aged 18 years and eight days, and went on to win eleven caps for Ireland, scoring four goals, including two on his international debut against Scotland in the 1887-88 British Home Championship. He also played once for the Irish League XI against England in 1894, and also played and scored in an unofficial international against a Canadian touring side.

Dalton and his wife Kathryn later emigrated to Canada, where he died aged 76 in 1946.
