= William Owen (footballer, born 1862) =

Welsh footballer

Personal information
- Date of birth: 1862
- Place of birth: Wales

Senior career*
Years	Team	Apps	(Gls)
- Chirk

International career
1880–1884	Wales	12	(6)
- * Club domestic league appearances and goals

William Owen (born 1862) was a Welsh international footballer. He was part of the Wales national football team between 1884 and 1893, playing 16 matches and scoring 5 goals. He played his first match on 17 March 1884 against England and his last match on 8 April 1893 against Ireland. At club level he played for Chirk.

== See also ==
- List of Wales international footballers (alphabetical)
