= James Low (Scottish footballer) =

Scottish footballer

Personal information
- Full name: James Low
- Date of birth: 1 June 1863
- Place of birth: Bridgeton, Scotland
- Date of death: 29 January 1929 (aged 65)
- Place of death: Cambuslang, Scotland
- Position: Outside right

Senior career*
Years	Team	Apps	(Gls)
1883–1896	Cambuslang	31	(7)

International career
1891	Scotland	1	(1)
- * Club domestic league appearances and goals

James Low (1 June 1863 – 29 January 1929) was a Scottish footballer who played as an outside right.

== Career ==
Low played club football for Cambuslang, spending 15 years with the club (though he missed the biggest match in their history, the 1888 Scottish Cup Final), and made one appearance for Scotland in 1891.

He was the elder brother of fellow Scottish international footballer Tommy Low.
