= Olphert Stanfield =

Irish footballer (1869–1952)

Personal information
- Full name: Olphert Martin Stanfield
- Date of birth: 26 February 1869
- Place of birth: Hillsborough, Ireland
- Date of death: 13 March 1952 (aged 83)
- Place of death: Belfast, Northern Ireland
- Position: Forward

Youth career
- 188x–1886: Genoa

Senior career*
Years	Team	Apps	(Gls)
1886–1898	Distillery	181	(178)

International career
1887–1897	Ireland	30	(11)
1894–1897	Irish League XI	6	(1)
- * Club domestic league appearances and goals

Olphert Martin Stanfield (26 February 1869 – 13 March 1952) was an Irish footballer who played for Distillery and Ireland during the 1880s and 1890s. Stanfield was a complete forward, capable of scoring with either foot and his head. He was also comfortable playing as centre-forward, inside-left or inside-right. He was the most capped international footballer during the 19th century, Ireland's record goalscorer during the 19th century and remains the most capped Distillery player of all time.

== Club career ==
Stanfield joined Distillery in 1886 from Genoa FC and by the end of the decade had scored over 90 goals. During the 1889–89 season he scored hat-tricks in four consecutive games and helped Distillery win an Irish Cup/County Antrim Shield double.

During the 1890s Stanfield became a Distillery legend, making 147 competitive appearances and scoring at least 105 goals. He scored at least seven hat-tricks during the 1890s and scored the winner in the 1894 Irish Cup final. He also scored the winner in a play-off for Irish League title in 1896, helping Distillery win a treble.

By the time he retired, Stanfield had played 181 competitive games for Distillery, scoring 178 goals. He also played in a further 115 friendlies, scoring a further 62 goals. During his career at Distillery, his teammates included fellow Irish internationals Billy Crone and Jack Reynolds.

== International career ==
Stanfield made his international debut for Ireland on 5 February 1887, aged 17 years and 344 days, in a 7–0 defeat to England at Bramall Lane, Sheffield. Stanfield scored his first goal for Ireland in 4–1 against Wales on 19 February 1887. This was also Ireland's first ever win.

On 7 February 1891, Stanfield scored four goals in a 7–2 win over Wales and as a result became the first Irish player to finish as top scorer in a British Home Championship. During the 1894 championship, Stanfield scored three goals in successive internationals. The highlight of the three came on 3 March 1894 at the Solitude Ground in Belfast, when after thirteen attempts Ireland finally avoided defeat to England. Against an England team that included Fred Spiksley and Jack Reynolds, who had since switched allegiances, Stanfield's goal inspired Ireland to come back from 2–0 down to gain a 2–2 draw.

== Death ==
Stanfield died on 13 March 1952 at Belfast City Hospital.

== Honours ==
Distillery

- Irish Champions: 1895–96
- Irish Cup winners: 1888–89, 1893–94, 1895–96
- Irish Cup runners Up: 1887–88
- County Antrim Shield winners: 1888–89, 1892–93, 1895–96, 1896–97
