= Wales national football team results (1876–1899) =

Wales football team results 1876–99

The Wales national football team represents Wales in international association football and is governed by the Football Association of Wales. The team are the third oldest in international football, behind only Scotland and England and played their first match on 18 March 1876, a 4–0 defeat to Scotland at Hamilton Crescent in Glasgow. Wales played their first home fixture the following year, which Scotland won 2–0 at the Racecourse Ground in Wrexham. (Note: Although some sources have credited Acton Park with the first home international, most contemporary sources support the Racecourse.) Wales met England for the first time in 1879 and recorded their first victory against them two years later, winning 1–0 at Alexandra Meadows following a goal from John Vaughan. In 1882, Wales played Ireland for the first time, defeating them 7–1 at the Racecourse.

With all four Home Nations playing annual friendly matches, the decision was taken to organise the fixtures into a competition. The British Home Championship, a round-robin tournament, was subsequently formed and the inaugural season was held in 1884. Wales won their opening fixture 6–0 against Ireland but defeats against England and Scotland in their remaining matches led to a third-place finish. In 1888, Wales recorded the largest victory in the team's history by defeating Ireland 11–0; Jack Doughty scored four of his side's goals. It was not until 1895 that Wales finished higher than third in the Championship, claiming a second-place finish after drawing all three fixtures.

From the nation's first fixture in 1876 to the end of the century Wales played 63 fixtures, winning 11, drawing 8 and losing the remaining 44. Of the side's victories, 9 were secured over Ireland and 2 over England, while they failed to defeat Scotland in 24 attempts during this period. The team's struggles were exacerbated by the reluctance of clubs in the Football League to release Welsh players for international fixtures, which often clashed with league matches. In the 1890s, Wales finished bottom of the British Home Championship in six of the ten tournaments held and lost nine of their final ten matches in the decade.

== Results ==
Wales' score is shown first in each case. The colours listed below are also used to signify results combined with the scoreline.

Key
Colour (with score)	Meaning
	Defeat
	Draw
	Win

Wales national football team results 1876–1899 (Note: Table information sourced from the references listed in the statistics section below.)
Match no.	Date	Venue	H/A	Opponents	Score	Competition	Wales scorers	Att. (Note: Due to the unavailability of exact figures, attendance numbers are given as recorded estimates.)
1	25 March 1876	Hamilton Crescent, Glasgow	A	Scotland	0–4	Friendly		17,000
2	5 March 1877	Racecourse Ground, Wrexham	H	Scotland	0–2	Friendly		4,000
3	23 March 1878	Hampden Park, Glasgow	A	Scotland	0–9	Friendly		6,000
4	18 January 1879	Kennington Oval, London	A	England	1–2	Friendly	William Davies	200 (Note: Reports vary over the exact attendance due to poor weather conditions. Some reports estimate as few as 100 attended, although most sources approximate around 200.)
5	7 April 1879	Racecourse Ground, Wrexham	H	Scotland	0–3	Friendly		2,000
6	15 March 1880	Racecourse Ground, Wrexham	H	England	2–3	Friendly	William Roberts, John Roberts	3,000
7	27 March 1880	Hampden Park, Glasgow	A	Scotland	1–5	Friendly	William Roberts	2,000
8	26 February 1881	Alexandra Meadows, Blackburn	A	England	1–0	Friendly	John Vaughan	3,000
9	14 March 1881	Racecourse Ground, Wrexham	H	Scotland	1–5	Friendly	Knyvett Crosse	1,500
10	25 February 1882	Racecourse Ground, Wrexham	H	Ireland	7–1	Friendly	John Price (4), William Pierce Owen (2), John Morgan	2,000
11	13 March 1882	Racecourse Ground, Wrexham	H	England	5–3	Friendly	William Pierce Owen (2), John Morgan, Alf Jones (og), John Vaughan	5,000
12	25 March 1882	Hampden Park, Glasgow	A	Scotland	0–5	Friendly		5,000
13	3 February 1883	Kennington Oval, London	A	England	0–5	Friendly		5,000
14	12 March 1883	Racecourse Ground, Wrexham	H	Scotland	0–3	Friendly		2,000
15	17 March 1883	Ballynafeigh Park, Belfast	A	Ireland	1–1	Friendly	Walter Roberts	1,000
16	9 February 1884	Racecourse Ground, Wrexham	H	Ireland	6–0	1883–84 British Home Championship	William Pierce Owen (2), Edward Shaw (2), John Eyton-Jones, Robert Albert Jones	2,000
17	17 March 1884	Racecourse Ground, Wrexham	H	England	0–4	1883–84 British Home Championship		4,500
18	29 March 1884	Cathkin Park, Glasgow	A	Scotland	1–4	1883–84 British Home Championship	Robert Roberts	1,000
19	14 March 1885	Leamington Road, Blackburn	A	England	1–1	1884–85 British Home Championship	Job Wilding	7,500
20	23 March 1885	Racecourse Ground, Wrexham	H	Scotland	1–8	1884–85 British Home Championship	Robert Albert Jones	2,000
21	11 April 1885	Ballynafeigh Park, Belfast	A	Ireland	8–2	1884–85 British Home Championship	Herbert Sisson (3), John Roach (2), William Owen, Tom Burke, Humphrey Jones	1,500
22	27 February 1886	Racecourse Ground, Wrexham	H	Ireland	5–0	1885–86 British Home Championship	Bill Roberts, Job Wilding, Richard Hersee, Thomas Bryan, Herbert Sisson	700
23	29 March 1886	Racecourse Ground, Wrexham	H	England	1–3	1885–86 British Home Championship	Billy Lewis	5,000
24	10 April 1886	Cathkin Park, Glasgow	A	Scotland	1–4	1885–86 British Home Championship	John Owen Vaughan	5,500
25	28 February 1887	Kennington Oval, London	A	England	0–4	1886–87 British Home Championship		4,500
26	12 March 1887	Cliftonville Cricket Ground, Belfast	A	Ireland	1–4	1886–87 British Home Championship	Henry Sabine	4,000
27	21 March 1887	Racecourse Ground, Wrexham	H	Scotland	0–2	1886–87 British Home Championship		2,000
28	4 February 1888	Alexandra Recreation Ground, Crewe	A	England	1–5	1887–88 British Home Championship	Jack Doughty	6,000
29	3 March 1888	Racecourse Ground, Wrexham	H	Ireland	11–0	1887–88 British Home Championship	Jack Doughty (4), Roger Doughty (2), Edmund Howell (2), Job Wilding (2), William Pryce-Jones	2,000
30	10 March 1888	Hibernian Park, Edinburgh	A	Scotland	1–5	1887–88 British Home Championship	Jack Doughty	8,000
31	28 February 1889	Victoria Ground, Stoke	A	England	1–4	1888–89 British Home Championship	William Owen	6,000
32	15 April 1889	Racecourse Ground, Wrexham	H	Scotland	0–0	1888–89 British Home Championship		6,000
33	27 April 1889	Ballynafeigh Park, Belfast	A	Ireland	3–1	1888–89 British Home Championship	Richard Jarrett	1,500
34	8 February 1890	Old Racecourse, Shrewsbury	H (Note: The Football Association of Wales chose to hold a fixture in the English border town of Shrewsbury in the hope of drawing a larger crowd.)	Ireland	5–2	1889–90 British Home Championship	William Pryce-Jones (2), William Owen, Dick Wilcock, David Lewis	3,000
35	15 March 1890	Racecourse Ground, Wrexham	H	England	1–3	1889–90 British Home Championship	Billy Lewis	3,000
36	22 March 1890	Underwood Park, Paisley	A	Scotland	0–5	1889–90 British Home Championship		5,000
37	7 February 1891	Ulsterville, Belfast	A	Ireland	2–7	1890–91 British Home Championship	Albert Davies, Jack Bowdler	6,000
38	7 March 1891	Newcastle Road, Sunderland	A	England	1–4	1890–91 British Home Championship	Albert Davies, Edmund Howell	15,000
39	21 March 1891	Racecourse Ground, Wrexham	H	Scotland	3–4	1890–91 British Home Championship	Albert Davies, Jack Bowdler (2), William Owen	6,000
40	27 February 1892	Penrhyn Park, Bangor	H	Ireland	1–1	1891–92 British Home Championship	Benjamin Lewis	4,000
41	5 March 1892	Racecourse Ground, Wrexham	H	England	0–2	1891–92 British Home Championship		4,500
42	26 March 1892	Tynecastle Park, Edinburgh	A	Scotland	1–6	1891–92 British Home Championship	Benjamin Lewis	6,000
43	13 March 1893	Victoria Ground, Stoke	A	England	0–6	1892–93 British Home Championship		10,000
44	18 March 1893	Racecourse Ground, Wrexham	H	Scotland	0–8	1892–93 British Home Championship		4,500
45	8 April 1893	Solitude, Belfast	A	Ireland	3–4	1892–93 British Home Championship	George Owen (2), William Owen	3,000
46	24 February 1894	St. Helen's, Swansea	H	Ireland	4–1	1893–94 British Home Championship	Billy Lewis (2), Edwin James (2)	7,000
47	12 March 1894	Racecourse Ground, Wrexham	H	England	1–5	1893–94 British Home Championship	Jack Bowdler	5,500
48	24 March 1894	Rugby Park, Kilmarnock	A	Scotland	2–5	1893–94 British Home Championship	Hugh Morris	10,000
49	16 March 1895	Solitude, Belfast	A	Ireland	2–2	1894–95 British Home Championship	Harry Trainer (2)	6,000
50	18 March 1895	Queen's Club, London	A	England	1–1	1894–95 British Home Championship	Billy Lewis	10,000
51	23 March 1895	Racecourse Ground, Wrexham	H	Scotland	2–2	1894–95 British Home Championship	Billy Lewis, Thomas Chapman	4,000
52	29 February 1896	Racecourse Ground, Wrexham	H	Ireland	6–1	1895–96 British Home Championship	Billy Lewis, Billy Meredith (2), Harry Pugh, Grenville Morris	3,000
53	16 March 1896	Cardiff Arms Park, Cardiff	H	England	1–9	1895–96 British Home Championship	Thomas Chapman	10,000
54	21 March 1896	Carolina Port, Dundee	A	Scotland	0–4	1895–96 British Home Championship		11,700
55	6 March 1897	Solitude, Belfast	A	Ireland	3–4	1896–97 British Home Championship	Billy Meredith (2), Caesar Jenkyns	10,000
56	20 March 1897	Racecourse Ground, Wrexham	H	Scotland	2–2	1896–97 British Home Championship	Morgan Morgan-Owen, Harry Pugh	5,000
57	29 March 1897	Bramall Lane, Sheffield	A	England	0–4	1896–97 British Home Championship	Morgan Morgan-Owen, Harry Pugh	5,000
58	19 February 1898	The Oval, Llandudno	H	Ireland	0–1	1897–98 British Home Championship		6,000
59	19 March 1898	Fir Park, Motherwell	A	Scotland	2–5	1897–98 British Home Championship	Thomas John Thomas, Morgan Morgan-Owen	3,500
60	28 March 1898	Racecourse Ground, Wrexham	H	England	0–3	1897–98 British Home Championship		4,000
61	4 March 1899	Grosvenor Park, Belfast	A	Ireland	0–1	1898–99 British Home Championship		6,000
62	18 March 1899	Racecourse Ground, Wrexham	H	Scotland	0–6	1898–99 British Home Championship		12,000
63	20 March 1899	Ashton Gate Stadium, Bristol	A	England	0–4	1898–99 British Home Championship		10,000

== Head to head records ==
Head to head records
Opponent	P	W	D	L	GF	GA	W%	D%	L%
England	21	2	2	17	18	75	9.52	9.52	80.95
Ireland	18	9	3	6	70	28	50	16.67	33.33
Scotland	24	0	3	21	18	106	0	12.50	87.50
Totals	63	11	8	44	106	209	17.46	12.70	69.84
