= 1887–88 British Home Championship =

Tournament details
- Host country: England, Ireland, Scotland and Wales
- Dates: 4 February – 7 April 1888
- Teams: 4

Final positions
- Champions: England (2nd title)
- Runners-up: Scotland

Tournament statistics
- Matches played: 6
- Goals scored: 46 (7.67 per match)
- Top scorer: (Wales) Jack Doughty (6 goals)

The 1887–88 British Home Championship was the fifth edition of the annual international football tournament played between the British Home Nations. It was the first edition of the tournament in which Scotland did not at least share in the trophy and was also notable for a record flood of goals, 46 in six games, 26 of them conceded by Ireland, who suffered a disastrous competition.

England began the tournament in the same vein as they finished it, winning the opening match 5–1 against Wales at the Alexandra Recreation Ground in Crewe. Wales responded to this, and to their shock defeat by Ireland the year previously with an 11–0 thrashing of the visiting Irish, a Welsh record scoreline which remains standing after 138 years. Any hopes of a recovery for the Welsh were however dashed in their final game when Scotland administered a 5–1 beating in Edinburgh.

England returned to the fray and gained revenge for their narrow defeat in the deciding match of the previous year when they in turn thrashed Scotland 5–0 in Glasgow, leaving only the weak Irish in between them and the trophy. Before this however, Ireland received another massive defeat at the hands of Scotland, who beat them 2–10 in Belfast to take second place. In the final game, England needed only a draw to secure the title but managed a win by five goals to one to take their first undisputed championship.

== Table ==
Team	Pld	W	D	L	GF	GA	GD	Pts
England (C)	3	3	0	0	15	2	+13	6
Scotland	3	2	0	1	15	8	+7	4
Wales	3	1	0	2	13	10	+3	2
Ireland	3	0	0	3	3	26	−23	0

Rules for classification: 1) Points. The points system worked as follows: 2 points for a win and 1 point for a draw.
(C) Champions

== Results ==
4 February 1888

England	5–1	Wales
Dewhurst; Woodhall; Lindley; Goodall		J. Doughty

Alexandra Recreation Ground, Crewe
Attendance: 6,000
Referee: John Sinclair (Ireland)

3 March 1888

Wales	11–0	Ireland
J. Doughty; R. Doughty; Howell; Wilding; Pryce-Jones

Racecourse Ground, Wrexham
Attendance: 2,000
Referee: Tom Hindle (England)

10 March 1888

Scotland	5–1	Wales
Paul 6'; Munro 30'; Latta 33', 75'; Groves 65'		J. Doughty 41'

Hibernian Park, Edinburgh
Attendance: 8,000
Referee: John Charles Clegg (England)

17 March 1888

Scotland	0–5	England
		Lindley 32'; Hodgetts 34'; Dewhurst 40', 49'; Goodall 43'

Hampden Park, Glasgow
Attendance: 10,000
Referee: John Sinclair (Ireland)

24 March 1888

Ireland	2–10	Scotland
Dalton 18', 24'		Dewar 5'; Dickson 8', 33', 40', 45'; Breckenridge 15'; Aitken 30'; McCallum 53'; Robert Wilson 77' (o.g.); Stewart 83'

Oldpark Avenue, Belfast
Attendance: 5,000
Referee: Robert Parlane (Scotland)

7 April 1888

Ireland	1–5	England
Crone		Allen; Dewhurst; Lindley

Ulster Cricket Ground, Belfast
Attendance: 7,000
Referee: James McKillop (Scotland)

== Winning squad ==
- England

Name	Apps/Goals by opponent			Total	
Name	(Wales) WAL	(Ireland) IRE	(Scotland) SCO	Apps	Goals
Fred Dewhurst	1/3	1/1	1/2	3	6
Tinsley Lindley	1/1	1/1	1	3	2
Dennis Hodgetts	1	1	1/1	3	1
Harry Allen	1	1	1	3	0
John Goodall	1		1/1	2	1
George Woodhall	1/1		1	2	1
Percy Walters		1	1	2	0
Cecil Holden-White	1		1	2	0
Bob Howarth	1		1	2	0
Billy Moon	1		1	2	0
Albert Allen		1/3		1	3
George Haworth			1/1	1	1
Frank Saunders	1			1	0
Charlie Mason	1			1	0
Bob Roberts		1		1	0
Albert Aldridge		1		1	0
Bob Holmes		1		1	0
Charlie Shelton		1		1	0
Billy Bassett		1		1	0
