= List of Wales national football team hat-tricks =

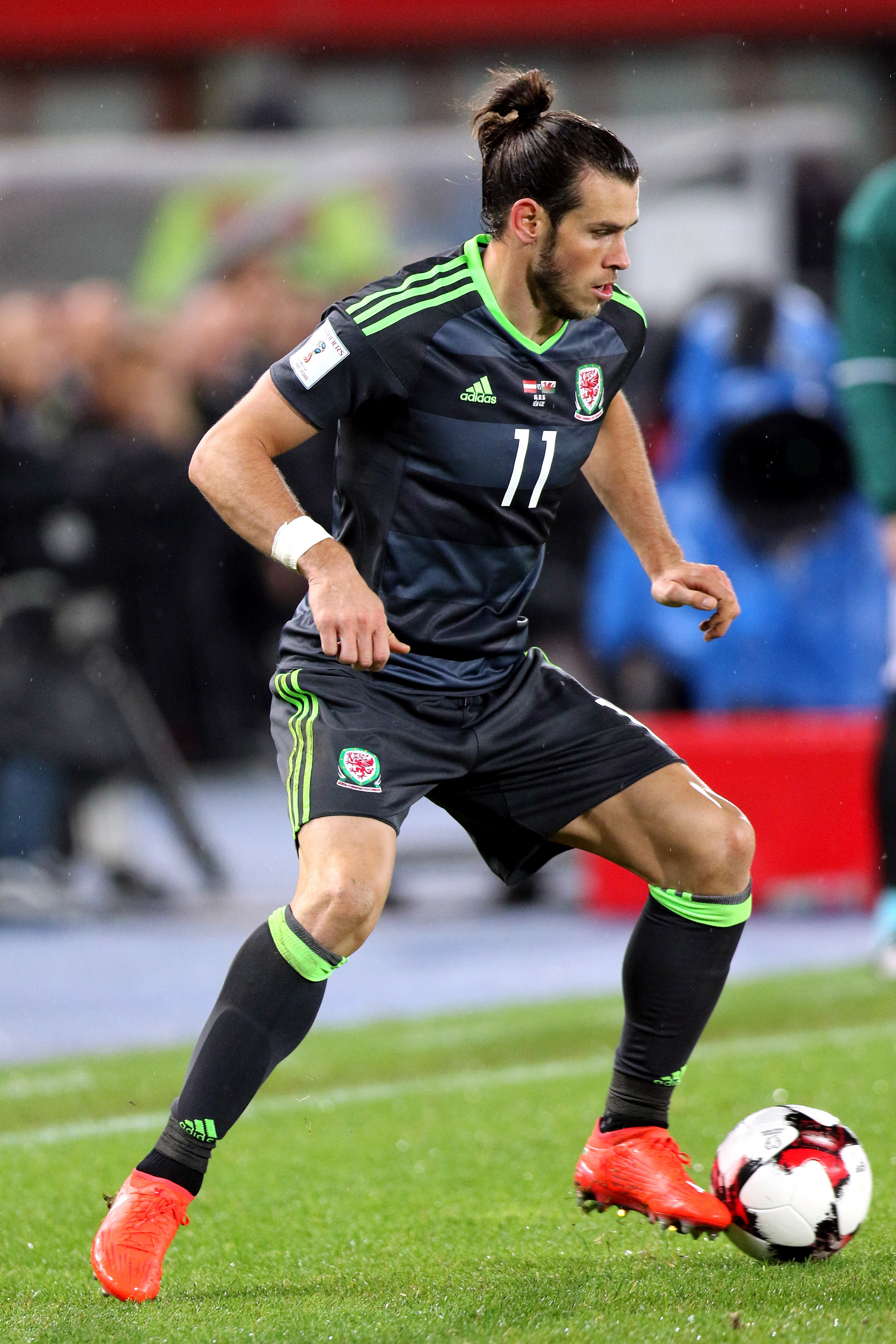
Gareth Bale is the only man to score more than one hat-trick for Wales.

Wales played their first international association football match on 25 March 1876 against Scotland. As of November 2025, sixteen Welshmen have scored a hat-trick (three goals) or more in an international match.

The first player to achieve the feat was John Price who scored four goals against Ireland on 25 February 1882. Other than Price, three other players have scored four goals during a match, Jack Doughty against Ireland in 1888, Mel Charles against Northern Ireland in 1962 and Ian Edwards against Malta in 1978.

Wales's first five hat-tricks were all scored against the same opposition, Ireland, before Trevor Ford scored three times against Belgium on 23 November 1949, also becoming the first Welsh player to score a hat-trick against a team not from the home nations.

In a 2022 FIFA World Cup qualification match against Belarus on 5 September 2021, Gareth Bale became the only man to score more than one hat-trick for Wales. On 18 November 2025, Harry Wilson became the latest player to score a hat-trick for Wales, in a 2026 FIFA World Cup qualification match against North Macedonia.

Wales have conceded 26 hat-tricks during their history,^{[a]} the first being scored by Clement Mitchell in a friendly match on 3 February 1883 against England. The first player to score a hat-trick against Wales from outside the home nations was Rajko Mitić for Yugoslavia on 21 May 1953. Seven players have scored more than three goals in a single match against Wales, Joe Bambrick's six goals for Ireland during a 1929–30 British Home Championship match is the most goals scored by a player against Wales in a single match. Filippo Inzaghi of Italy is the most recent player to score a hat-trick against Wales, in a UEFA Euro 2004 qualifying match on 6 September 2003.

== Hat-tricks for Wales ==
Key

More than a hat-trick scored *

Table

Wartime internationals, not regarded as official matches, are not included in the list. The result is presented with Wales' score first.

Date	Goals	Player	Opponent	Venue	Competition	Result	Ref
25 February 1882	4*	John Price	Ireland	Racecourse Ground, Wrexham	Friendly	7–1	
11 April 1885	3	Herbert Sisson	Ireland	Ulster Ground, Ballynafeigh	1884–85 British Home Championship	8–2	
3 March 1888	4*	Jack Doughty	Ireland	Racecourse Ground	1887–88 British Home Championship	11–0	
27 April 1889	3	Richard Jarrett	Ireland	Ulster Ground, Ballynafeigh	1888–89 British Home Championship	3–0	
2 April 1906	3	William Green	Ireland	Racecourse Ground	1905–06 British Home Championship	4–4	
23 November 1949	3	Trevor Ford	Belgium	Ninian Park, Cardiff	Friendly	5–1	
20 April 1955	3	John Charles	Northern Ireland	Windsor Park	1954–55 British Home Championship	3–2	
25 September 1957	3	Des Palmer	East Germany	Ninian Park, Cardiff	1958 FIFA World Cup qualification	4–1	
11 April 1962	4*	Mel Charles	Northern Ireland	Ninian Park, Cardiff	1961–62 British Home Championship	4–0	
3 April 1963	3	Cliff Jones	Northern Ireland	Windsor Park, Belfast	1962–63 British Home Championship	4–1	
25 October 1978	4*	Ian Edwards	Malta	Racecourse Ground, Wrexham	UEFA Euro 1980 qualification	7–0	
19 May 1979	3	John Toshack	Scotland	Ninian Park, Cardiff	1978–79 British Home Championship	3–0	
9 September 1992	3	Ian Rush	Faroe Islands	Cardiff Arms Park, Cardiff	1994 FIFA World Cup qualification	6–0	
18 February 2004	3	Robert Earnshaw	Scotland	Millennium Stadium, Cardiff	Friendly	4–0	
22 March 2018	3	Gareth Bale	China PR	Guangxi Sports Center, Nanning	2018 China Cup	6–0	
5 September 2021	3	Gareth Bale	Belarus	Central Stadium, Kazan	2022 FIFA World Cup Qualification	3–2	
18 November 2025	3	Harry Wilson	North Macedonia	Cardiff City Stadium, Cardiff	2026 FIFA World Cup Qualification	7-1	

== Hat-tricks conceded by Wales ==
Wartime internationals, not regarded as official matches, are not included in the list. The result is presented with Wales' score first.

Date	Goals	Player	Opponent	Venue	Competition	Result	Ref(s)
3 February 1883	3	Clement Mitchell	England	Kensington Oval, London	Friendly	0–5	
23 March 1885	3	Joseph Lindsay	Scotland	Acton Park, Wrexham	1884–85 British Home Championship	1–8	
4 February 1888	3	Fred Dewhurst	England	Nantwich Road, Crewe	1887–88 British Home Championship	1–5	
22 March 1890	4*	William Paul	Scotland	Underwood Park, Paisley	1890 British Home Championship	0–5	
7 February 1891	4*	Olphert Stanfield	Ireland	Ulsterville, Belfast	1890–91 British Home Championship	2–7	
18 March 1893	3	John Barker	Scotland	Racecourse Ground, Wrexham	1892–93 British Home Championship	0–8	
18 March 1893	4*	Jake Madden	Scotland	Racecourse Ground, Wrexham	1892–93 British Home Championship	0–8	
8 April 1893	3	Jack Peden	Ireland	Solitude, Belfast	1892–93 British Home Championship	2–7	
12 March 1894	3	John Veitch	England	Racecourse Ground, Wrexham	1893–94 British Home Championship	1–5	
16 March 1896	5*	Steve Bloomer	England	Arms Park, Cardiff	1895–96 British Home Championship	1–9	
19 March 1898	3	James Gillespie	Scotland	Fir Park, Motherwell	1897–98 British Home Championship	2–5	
18 March 1899	3	Robert Smyth McColl	Scotland	Racecourse Ground, Wrexham	1898–99 British Home Championship	0–6	
18 March 1901	4*	Steve Bloomer	England	St James' Park, Newcastle upon Tyne	1900–01 British Home Championship	0–6	
22 February 1902	3	Andy Gara	Ireland	Ninian Park, Cardiff	1901–02 British Home Championship	0–3	
16 March 1908	3	Vivian Woodward	England	Racecourse Ground, Wrexham	1907–08 British Home Championship	1–7	
27 October 1928	3	Hugh Gallagher	Scotland	Ibrox Park, Glasgow	1928–29 British Home Championship	2–4	
20 November 1929	3	George Camsell	England	Stamford Bridge, London	1929–30 British Home Championship	0–6	
1 February 1930	6*	Joe Bambrick	Ireland	Windsor Park, Belfast	1929–30 British Home Championship	0–7	
15 October 1949	3	Jackie Milburn	England	Ninian Park, Cardiff	1950 FIFA World Cup qualification 1950 British Home Championship	1–4	
21 May 1953	3	Rajko Mitić	(Socialist Federal Republic of Yugoslavia) Yugoslavia	JNA Stadium, Belgrade	Friendly	2–5	
22 September 1954	3	Todor Veselinović	(Socialist Federal Republic of Yugoslavia) Yugoslavia	Ninian Park, Cardiff	Friendly	1–3	
10 November 1954	3	Roy Bentley	England	Wembley Stadium, London	1953–54 British Home Championship	2–3	
4 November 1969	3	Gigi Riva	Italy	Stadio Olimpico, Rome	1970 FIFA World Cup qualification	1–4	
9 November 1996	3	Dennis Bergkamp	Netherlands	Philips Stadion, Eindhoven	1998 FIFA World Cup qualification	1–7	
20 August 1997	4*	Hakan Şükür	Turkey	Ali Sami Yen Stadium, Istanbul	1998 FIFA World Cup qualification	4–6	
6 September 2003	3	Filippo Inzaghi	Italy	San Siro, Milan	UEFA Euro 2004 qualifying	0–4	

== Notes ==
^{a} Some sources attribute a hat-trick to Alex Smith during a 5–1 victory for Scotland on 15 March 1902. However, others, including the Scottish Football Association, attribute two of his goals to other Scottish players.
