= 1888–89 British Home Championship =

Tournament details
- Host country: England, Ireland, Scotland and Wales
- Dates: 23 February – 27 April 1889
- Teams: 4

Final positions
- Champions: Scotland (5th title)
- Runners-up: England

Tournament statistics
- Matches played: 6
- Goals scored: 28 (4.67 per match)
- Top scorer(s): (Scotland) Willie Groves (England) Billy Bassett (Wales) Richard Jarrett (England) John Yates (3 goals)

The 1888–89 British Home Championship was the sixth international football tournament between the British Home Nations and as with all but one of the previous tournaments, Scotland won, beating England by one point to take the championship. Wales achieved third place whilst Ireland finished bottom, as they had for five of the previous competitions.

England began the strongest team, scoring ten goals in their first two matches against Wales and Ireland for just two in reply. Scotland then showed their intent with a 7–0 defeat of Ireland at home in their first game. In what would turn out to be the deciding game of the competition, England and Scotland then played out a very fast-paced match which Scotland won 3–2 despite England's home advantage. Only needing a single point against Wales in their last match, Scotland only just achieved it, finishing with a rare scoreless draw. Ireland and Wales then played the decider for last place, Wales comfortably beating the Irish 3–1.

== Table ==
Team	Pld	W	D	L	GF	GA	GD	Pts
Scotland	3	2	1	0	10	2	+8	5
England	3	2	0	1	12	5	+7	4
Wales	3	1	1	1	4	5	−1	3
Ireland	3	0	0	3	2	16	−14	0

Rules for classification: 1) points. The points system worked as follows: 2 points for a win and 1 point for a draw.

== Results ==
23 February 1889

England	4–1	Wales
Johnny Goodall; Dewhurst; Southworth; Bassett		Owen

Victoria Ground, Stoke
Attendance: 6,000
Referee: John Campbell(Scotland)

2 March 1889

England	6–1	Ireland
Yates; Shelton; Lofthouse; Brodie		James Wilton

Anfield, Liverpool
Attendance: 6,500
Referee: Alfred Davies(Wales)

9 March 1889

Scotland	7–0	Ireland
Watt 7', 10'; Black 25'; Groves 32', 50', 70'; McInnes 88'

Ibrox Park, Glasgow
Attendance: 6,000
Referee: William H. Stacey (England)

13 April 1889

England	2–3	Scotland
Billy Bassett 15', 17'		Munro 55'; Oswald 82'; McLaren 90'

Kennington Oval, London
Attendance: 10,000
Referee: John Sinclair (Ireland)

15 April 1889

Wales	0–0	Scotland

Racecourse Ground, Wrexham
Attendance: 6,000
Referee: John Sinclair (Ireland)

27 April 1889

Ireland	1–3	Wales
Lemon		Jarrett

Ulster Cricket Ground, Belfast
Attendance: 1,500
Referee: Thomas Park (Scotland)

== Winning squad ==
- Scotland

Name	Apps/Goals by opponent			Total	
Name	(Wales) WAL	(Ireland) IRE	(England) ENG	Apps	Goals
Frank Watt	1	1/2		2	2
Willie Groves		1/3		1	3
James McLaren			1/1	1	1
Jimmy Oswald			1/1	1	1
Neil Munro			1/1	1	1
Tom McInnes		1/1		1	1
David Black		1/1		1	1
Walter Arnott			1	1	0
William Berry			1	1	0
Geordie Dewar			1	1	0
James Kelly			1	1	0
Alex Latta			1	1	0
John McPherson			1	1	0
Bob Smellie			1	1	0
James Wilson			1	1	0
James Adams		1		1	0
Bob Boyd		1		1	0
John Buchanan		1		1	0
David Calderhead		1		1	0
Ned Doig		1		1	0
Thomas McKeown		1		1	0
Thomas Robertson		1		1	0
John Auld	1			1	0
Harry Campbell	1			1	0
Jimmy Hannah	1			1	0
William Johnston	1			1	0
Alexander Lochhead	1			1	0
John McLeod	1			1	0
Willie Paul	1			1	0
John Rae	1			1	0
Allan Stewart	1			1	0
Andrew Thomson	1			1	0
