= Benjamin Lewis (footballer) =

Welsh footballer (1864–1944)

Billy Lewis
Personal information
- Full name: Benjamin Lewis
- Date of birth: 1 March 1864
- Place of birth: Leeswood, Wales
- Date of death: 1944
- Place of death: Wrexham, Wales
- Position: Centre forward

Youth career
- –1886: Buckley

Senior career*
Years	Team	Apps	(Gls)
1886–1887	Wrexham AFC	1	(0)
1887	Chester FC		
1890	Bootle		
1893–1895	Chester FC		
1895–1896	Wrexham AFC	0	(0)
1896–1897	Middlesbrough Ironopolis		
1897–1898	Wrexham AFC	14	(10)
1899–	Chester FC		

International career
1891	Wales	10	(1)
- * Club domestic league appearances and goals

Benjamin Lewis (1 March 1864 – 1944) was a Welsh footballer. He played as a centre forward for Crewe Alexandra, Chester and Wrexham. He made 10 appearances for the Wales national team, scoring once. He was the brother in law of fellow Wales international Job Wilding.
