= Albert Pryce-Jones =

Welsh footballer (1870–1946)

Personal information
- Full name: Albert Westhead Pryce-Jones
- Date of birth: 26 May 1870
- Place of birth: Newtown, Wales
- Date of death: 17 August 1946
- Place of death: Buenos Aires, Argentina

Youth career
- Shrewsbury School

Senior career*
| Years | Team | Apps | (Gls) |
| –1891 | Cambridge University | | |
| 1891–1898 | Newtown | | |

International career
| 1895 | Wales | 1 | (0) |
- * Club domestic league appearances and goals

Albert Pryce-Jones (26 May 1870 – 17 August 1946) was a Welsh footballer.

Pryce-Jones was born in Newtown, Montgomeryshire, Wales in 1870. He was the son of Sir Pryce Pryce-Jones, a former Conservative member of the British House of Commons.

He was part of the Wales national team, playing one match on 18 March 1895 against England.

In 1895 he played for Newtown in their Welsh Cup victory. He appeared alongside his brother William Pryce-Jones who was also an international footballer for Wales.

He emigrated to Calgary, Canada in 1910 where he established the department store Pryce-Jones Ltd.

He served in the Canadian infantry in World War I. He died in August 1946 in Buenos Aires, Argentina, aged 76.

== See also ==
- List of Wales international footballers (alphabetical)
