= Herbert Sisson =

Welsh footballer

Personal information
- Date of birth: 6 August 1862
- Place of birth: Wales
- Date of death: 2 May 1891 (aged 28)

Senior career*
Years	Team	Apps	(Gls)
1885–1886	Wrexham Olympic		

International career
1885–1886	Wales	3	(4)
- * Club domestic league appearances and goals

Herbert Sisson (born 1862) was a Welsh international footballer. He was part of the Wales national football team between 1885 and 1886, playing 3 matches and scoring 4 goals. He played his first match on 11 April 1885 against Ireland as part of the 1885 British Home Championship. He scored a hat-trick of 3 goals and Wales won the match by 8–2. He played his last match for Wales on 10 April 1886 against Scotland.

== See also ==
- List of Wales international footballers (alphabetical)
- List of Wales national football team hat-tricks
