= Wales national football team home stadium =

Wales football home venues

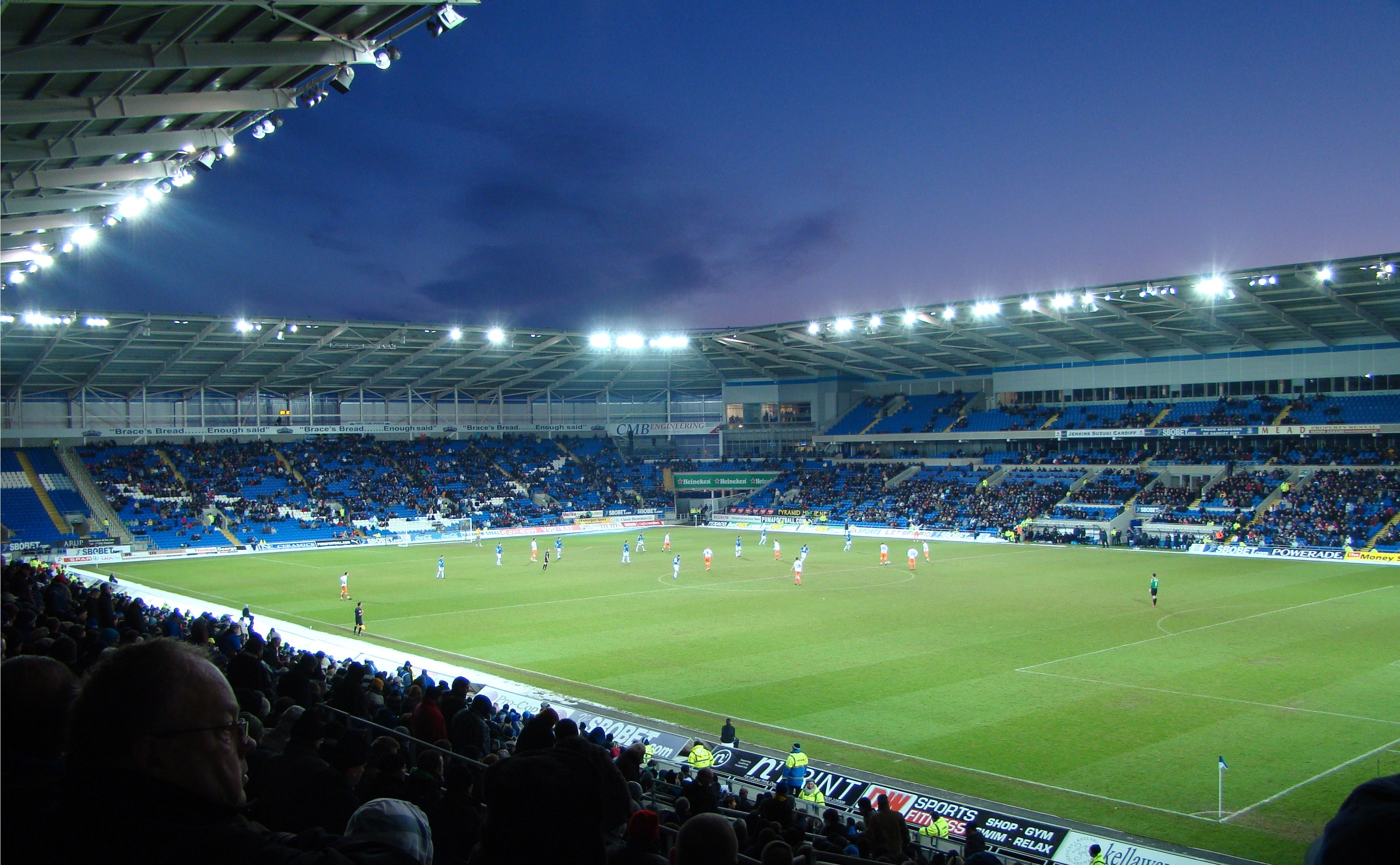
The Cardiff City Stadium, Wales's current venue for home matches

The Wales national football team represents Wales in international association football. The team played their first match in March 1876 against Scotland before hosting their first home match the following year against the same opponent. The location selected for the fixture was the Racecourse Ground in Wrexham, the world's oldest international football ground still in use. The ground hosted all of Wales's matches until 1890, when a game was played against Ireland in the English border town of Shrewsbury. Wales played matches in several parts of the country, including Bangor, Cardiff, and Swansea over the following two decades.

The advent of professionalism in Welsh club sides saw the construction of several purpose-built football grounds. Two, Ninian Park in Cardiff, which hosted its first international in 1911, and Vetch Field in Swansea, which hosted its first in 1921, shared Wales's home matches with the Racecourse for nearly a century. Although one match was moved to Anfield in Liverpool in 1977 as a result of crowd trouble, no other venue would host a Wales home international fixture between 1910 and 1989 (when the team began playing at the National Stadium in Cardiff). Construction of the Millennium Stadium in Cardiff was completed in 2000, and it was immediately named as the side's new home ground. Although attendance was initially high at the Millennium, a gradual drop saw the team play matches in several newly built grounds (including the Cardiff City Stadium and the Liberty Stadium). The former was popular, and was credited as a factor in the team's improvement; it was subsequently designated Wales's permanent home venue.

Since the team's first match, sixteen grounds have hosted a Wales home international. The Racecourse has held more matches than any other venue with 94 by January 2020, 12 more than the second-most-frequently-used ground, Ninian Park, which was demolished in 2009. Four home matches have been held outside Wales; three were played at Anfield in Liverpool, and one at the Old Racecourse in Shrewsbury.

== History ==
=== Early years (1876–1900) ===
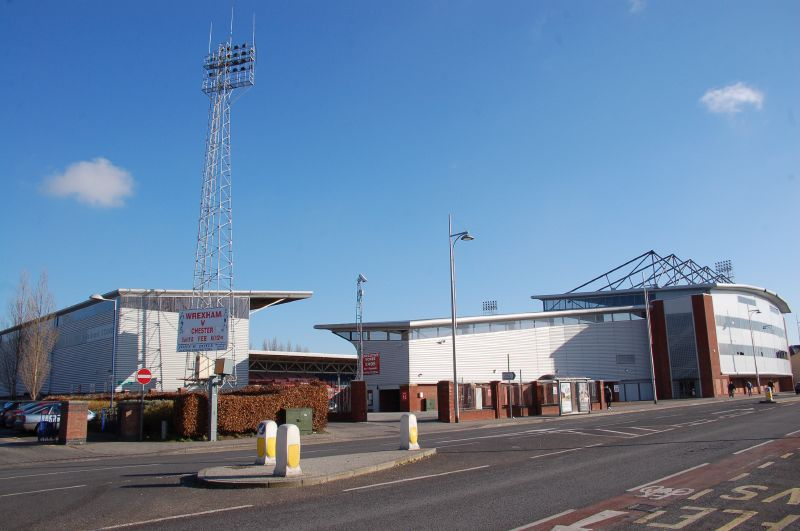
The Racecourse Ground has hosted more Wales international matches than any other stadium.

The Wales national football team played their first international match on 25 March 1876 against Scotland at Hamilton Crescent in Partick, losing 4–0. The fixture was reversed the following year, with Scotland travelling to Wales for the country's first home international on 5 March 1877 at the Racecourse Ground in Wrexham, which was owned by Wrexham Cricket Club. (Note: Although some sources have credited Acton Park with the first home international, most contemporary sources support the Racecourse.) The ground included a separate tent for women and their male companions. Guinness World Records recognises the Racecourse Ground as the world's oldest football ground which continues to host international matches. The next ground to stage an international which is still in use is Hampden Park in Glasgow, which did not host its first match for another 27 years. The Racecourse remained the only ground to host a Wales home international match until 1890, including the first meetings between Wales and England (1880) and Ireland (1882). Wales's meeting with Ireland led to the side's first victory on home ground, with John Price scoring four times in a 7–1 win. Wales had considerable success against the Irish side during the 1880s, winning by five or more goals on five occasions. The final victory, an 11–0 win at the Racecourse, remains Wales's record victory margin in international competition. During the formative years of international football, Wales's matches were played only against the other Home Nations in the British Home Championship, with matches alternating between home and away venues each year.

Matches against England and Scotland were held at the Racecourse in Wrexham as they tended to attract large crowds, while fixtures against the traditionally lesser-known Irish team were hosted by alternative venues. In 1890, Wales hosted Ireland at the Old Racecourse in the English border town of Shrewsbury. The Football Association of Wales (FAW), the country's governing body for the sport, believed that holding the match at the Old Racecourse would attract a larger crowd. Although the match drew a significant number of fans, its attendance of 5,000 was only equal to that at previous fixtures at the Racecourse Ground. Matches returned to Wrexham until 1892, when Wales's opening fixture of the 1891–92 British Home Championship against Ireland was moved to Penrhyn Park in Bangor; the FAW had been petitioned by the committee of the town's football club, Bangor, to host a match. The venue, provided by George Douglas-Pennant, 2nd Baron Penrhyn (who was present at the match), was on the grounds of Penrhyn Estate. Inexperienced security personnel were unable to manage a crush which developed in the waiting crowd, resulting in at least one serious injury when a boy suffered broken ribs. The crush forced stewards to open the gates to the ground and allow most of the spectators in without paying, losing the FAW significant gate revenue. The North Wales Express called the decision to admit all 5,000–6,000 spectators through a single small gate "sheer stupidity".

The FAW decided to play the first Wales international in the south of the country, traditionally a rugby union stronghold, in 1894. St. Helen's in Swansea, the home ground of the Wales rugby union team, was chosen as the venue, and the decision was viewed by some as a direct move against a competing sport; one English newspaper described it as "carrying the war into the enemy camp with a vengeance". On the day of the match, the Western Mail published a diagram of a football pitch and a list of differences between association football and rugby union for those unfamiliar with the former. Wales defeated Ireland 4–1 in front of over 10,000 spectators, generating a £147 profit for the FAW. Buoyed by the income, the FAW arranged a second match in South Wales for England's 1896 visit, the first time a team other than Ireland had been hosted away from the Racecourse. Encouraged by a rugby union crowd of 20,000 at Cardiff Arms Park earlier in the year, the FAW selected the ground in the hope of attracting a similar number. However, the match was a letdown on and off the pitch. Despite organising free train travel for supporters in North Wales, only 5,000 attended the game, a crushing 9–1 defeat for Wales. The FAW turned its attention back to North Wales, with Bangor initially scheduled to host Ireland in 1898. However, a late change of venue moved the match to the Oval in Llandudno instead. (Note: The site of the matches played in Llandudno are listed as Council Field or Commissioner's Field in some sources, but most contemporary sources list The Oval as the venue.) Wales returned to the venue two years later, with 6,000 spectators attending a second match against Ireland in 1900. When the match began, only 4,000 spectators were at the ground; however, crowd noise attracted additional interest (and attendance) as the game progressed.

=== Move south and pre-war success (1900–1945) ===
Wales returned to the Arms Park to face Ireland in 1902, meeting England at the Racecourse a month later. The match against England, which ended in a goalless draw, attracted a record Welsh crowd of around 10,000. When 1903's only home match was awarded to the Arms Park, 25 North Wales clubs signed a letter of complaint to the FAW and requested a meeting with the governing body. The decision stood, however, and a crowd of 6,000 witnessed a 1–0 loss to Scotland. Wales's matches were becoming popular, and Bangor sought to bring the side back by offering purpose-built stands at the town's cricket ground to host the 1904 match with Ireland. Gate control was an issue again as large numbers of spectators watched the game for free from nearby vantage points, including the roof of a local school and along a road overlooking the ground. Bangor made a loss of £17, despite a crowd of over 4,000, and has not held an international match since then.

Wales's 1906 meeting with England at the Arms Park attracted a record crowd of around 20,000 to a 1–0 loss. This led the FAW to again look for venues in South Wales; a match against Ireland was played at the Athletic Ground in the Rhondda mining town of Aberdare in 1908. Workers in the local collieries started work an hour early to reach the match on time, and a large crowd of around 10,000 rewarded the FAW's decision. Although the Arms Park in Cardiff was used again in 1910 for a match against England, the emergence of Cardiff City as a professional football club and the construction of Ninian Park, their purpose-built football ground, made it the last Wales international held at a rugby ground until 1989. Ninian Park hosted its first international match on 6 March 1911 against Scotland. Built on the site of a former rubbish tip, the pitch often became littered with debris which had risen to the surface. Although attempts were made before each match to clear the surface, Scottish player Peter McWilliam received a career-ending gash to his leg from a piece of glass; Wales's Billy Meredith cut his knee during the same game. Matches alternated between Ninian Park and the Racecourse until the outbreak of the First World War.

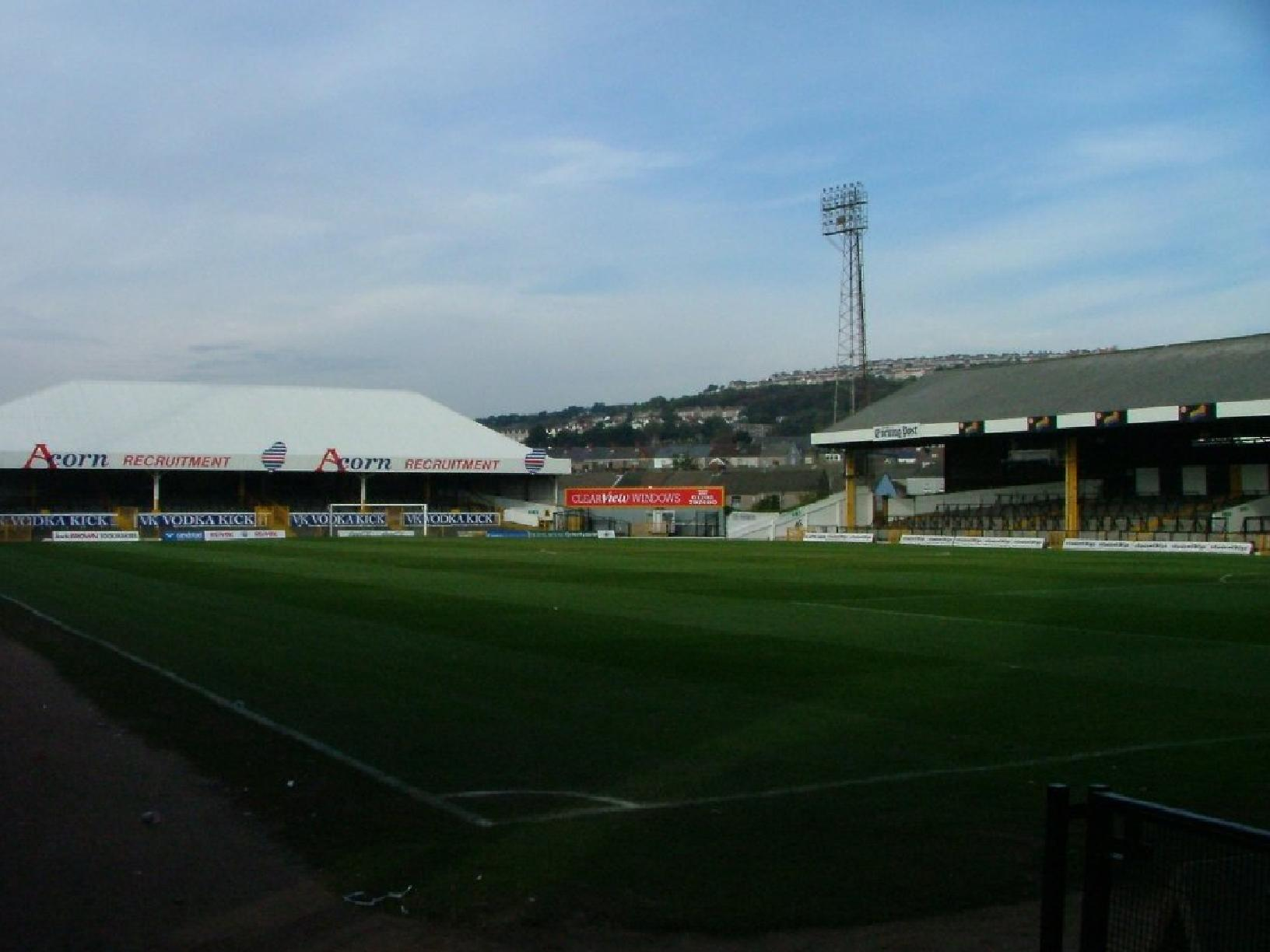
Vetch Field (pictured in 2006) hosted its first international match in 1921.

After the war, Wales's first competitive internationals were played at Ninian Park before Vetch Field hosted Ireland for its first international in April 1921. The Racecourse and Ninian Park became the main venues for the national side following the First World War. Although Welsh clubs such as Cardiff City and Swansea Town regularly drew record crowds, the national side struggled to attract similar attention during the 1920s. The FAW proposed to move a home match to Manchester or Liverpool in the hope of earning more money from a larger crowd, but were eventually dissuaded by representatives of Wrexham. A restructuring of the side under FAW secretary Ted Robbins and a switch to midweek matches, which allowed players to be released by their club teams more frequently, triggered a resurgence during the 1930s. The side won the 1932–33 British Home Championship, with the newly refurbished Racecourse attracting 25,000 fans (a record crowd in North Wales) to a goalless draw with England.

Wales retained the championship the following year, and another record crowd of 40,000 saw the side defeat Scotland 3–2 at Ninian Park in the first Cardiff match in four years. Although Robbins was reluctant to agree to a match in the city due to his belief that the FAW could earn more in North Wales, pressure from Western Mail reporter Harry Ditton and the promise of a free publicity campaign changed his mind. England's September 1934 visit was the first Wales home match with an attendance of over 50,000, and the increased crowds at Ninian Park made it the choice for Wales's biggest matches. This was despite the main grandstand at the ground being destroyed by a fire in January 1937, when thieves used explosives to open a safe holding gate receipts from an FA Cup match. When competitive football was halted during the Second World War, Wales played eight unofficial matches against England; all but one were held at Ninian Park.

=== Post-war success and decline (1946–1990) ===
Wales returned to the Racecourse in October 1946 for the side's first official post-war international. Football was a great attraction to the public, and the match was sold out in advance. After returning to Ninian Park the following year, the side was scheduled to play at Vetch Field in Swansea for the first time since 1928, against Northern Ireland. The FAW moved the match to the Racecourse, however, saying that "the appropriate authorities at Swansea had not found it convenient to meet with the wishes of the council." Large numbers of fans attended international matches in the early post-war era, with the British Home Championship now also being used as qualifying for the FIFA World Cup; the Racecourse hosted more than 30,000 spectators for the first time in 1946, and Ninian Park over 60,000 in 1950. The previous year Ninian Park hosted the first foreign international side to visit Wales, when Belgium was defeated 5–1 and Trevor Ford scored a hat-trick. Portugal and Switzerland travelled to Wales for friendlies soon afterwards.

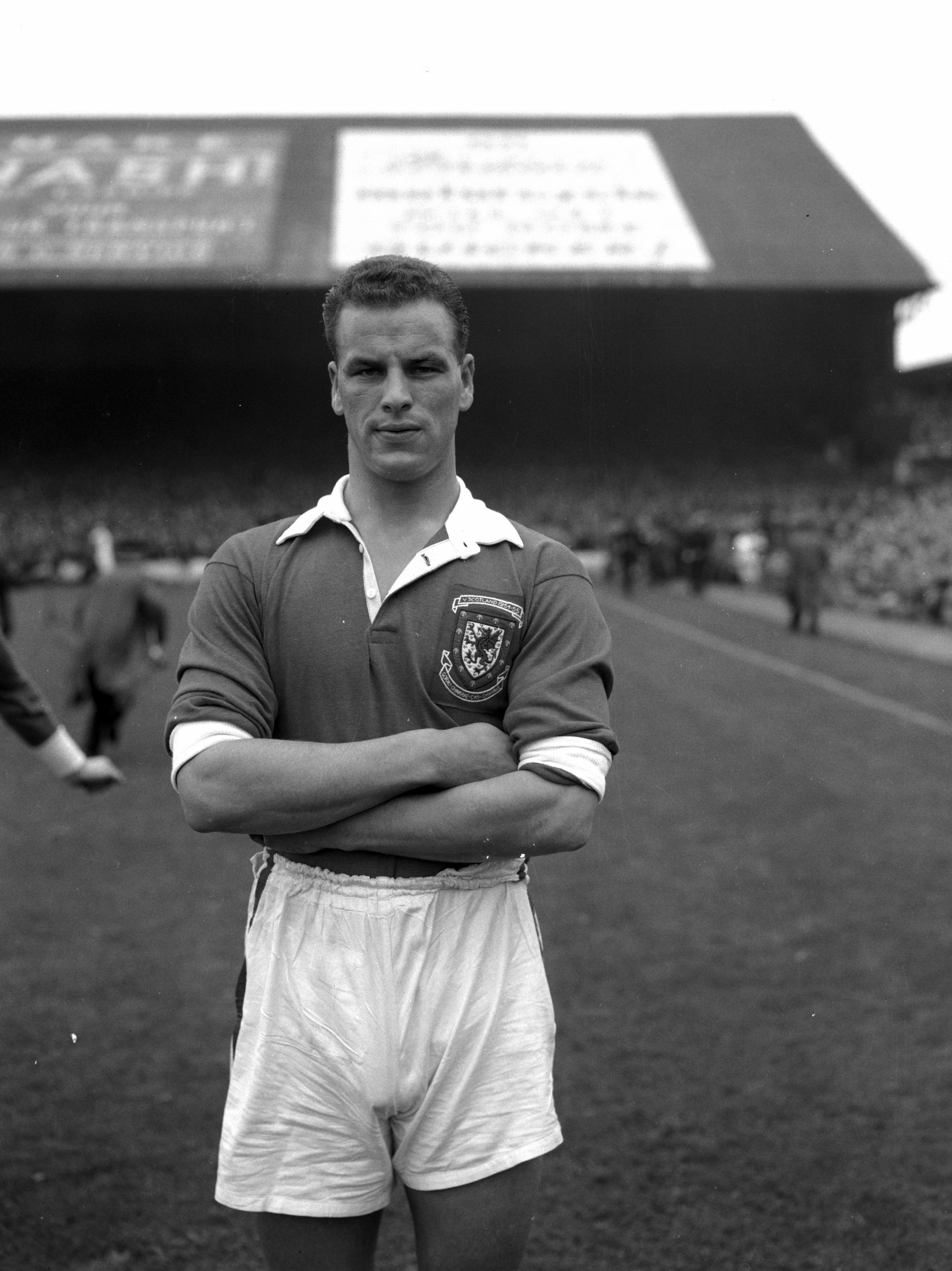
John Charles at Ninian Park before a 1954 match against Scotland

In 1952, Wales returned to Vetch Field for the first time in nearly 25 years to play Northern Ireland in the final match of the 1951–52 British Home Championship, the first post-war match held away from Cardiff or Wrexham. It was seen as a homecoming for a side with a number of players from the area, including Ford, Ivor Allchurch and Ray Daniel, and Allchurch contributed a goal to the 3–0 victory. Wales met Austria at the Racecourse in November 1955, after playing the side in Vienna the previous year. Austria were taken by surprise in the first match by the rough play of Welsh forwards Ford and Derek Tapscott, a style of play uncommon in Europe. The Austrian side wanted to match Wales physically in the return match, which was called "The Battle of Wrexham". They claimed a 2–1 victory, with Wales's Roy Paul later describing the team's dressing room after the game: "Our goalkeeper, Jack Kelsey, had scars on both legs. Derek Tapscott [...] had a six-inch gash on his knee. [...] John Charles leaned over his brother Melvyn with tears in his eyes. Melvyn lay silent, still dazed by a tackle which had sent him crashing to the ground". The Western Mail described the match as "a disgrace", and one Austrian player called it "more like a boxing and kicking match than football".

Despite a positive start to their qualifying campaign for the 1958 FIFA World Cup, defeating Czechoslovakia at Ninian Park during their opening game, Wales finished second in their group. When Israel's political status prompted several sides to refuse to play against the nation, however, Wales received another chance to qualify; according to FIFA rules, a team could not qualify for a World Cup without playing a match. A two-legged play-off against a European nation was arranged with Wales being drawn second after Belgium also refused the tie. Wales defeated Israel 4–0 on aggregate, with the home tie held at Ninian Park, to qualify for the tournament finals. Wales reached the quarter-finals, where they were defeated by Brazil. The team's World Cup success attracted more interest in the side, and in October 1959, a year after the tournament, a crowd of 62,634 watched a 1–1 draw with England at Ninian Park. The attendance set a record for a Wales home international which stood for more than 40 years, and was the highest attendance ever recorded at Ninian Park. High attendance figures continued into the early 1960s, with the next visit by England in 1961 attracting a similar crowd of 61,566. The steady decline in fortune by the side during the mid-1960s, however, resulted in crowd numbers falling dramatically. A 4–1 victory over Greece at Ninian Park in March 1965 attracted only 11,159 spectators, the lowest post-war crowd at the ground since before the Second World War. Only 4,616 fans attended a World Cup qualifying match against Denmark at the Racecourse the following year, the lowest crowd ever recorded for a Wales match in the competition.

Attendance improved slightly during the early 1970s. Matches against neighbouring England still attracted considerable interest, with each of three fixtures at Ninian Park attended by over 30,000 fans. With Swansea City struggling financially, FAW secretary Trevor Morris attempted to help the club by holding Wales matches at Vetch Field. The ground hosted more international matches in quick succession between 1970 and 1974 than ever before (more than the Racecourse), including World Cup and European Championship qualifiers against Czechoslovakia, Finland and Luxembourg. The Racecourse, however, was chosen to host Wales's crucial final group match against Austria during the qualifiers for UEFA Euro 1976, with Wales needing only to avoid defeat in order to qualify. The traditional British anthem "God Save the Queen" was omitted for the first time in the side's history, with only the Welsh anthem "Hen Wlad Fy Nhadau" (Land of my Fathers) played. Although "God Save the Queen" returned for several matches, it was eventually dropped permanently. A goal by Arfon Griffiths secured a 1–0 victory for Wales, who reached the quarter-finals; during this edition of the European Championships the quarter-finals were played as two-legged encounters on a home-and-away basis, rather than as part of the finals. Wales's next match, against England, celebrated the 100th anniversary of their first international fixture; at the Racecourse, 21,000 fans saw a 2–1 loss.

The side were drawn against Yugoslavia for the Euro 1976 quarter-finals, losing the first leg 2–0 in Zagreb. The second leg was billed as one of the biggest matches in Wales's history, and the FAW, which had grown increasingly short of funds, considered an offer to move the game to Wembley Stadium in London to maximise profit. The FAW board was split after a vote, leaving the decision in the hands of president Terry Squire, who chose Ninian Park as the venue. East German referee Rudi Glöckner was appointed for the match, and was infuriated when the flag of his home nation was not raised before the game. Glöckner controversially awarded Yugoslavia a penalty in the first half and disallowed a goal for Wales in the second, as the increasingly irate crowd made several attempts to enter the pitch. Missiles were aimed at Glöckner for the remainder of the match, which ended in a 1–1 draw and eliminated Wales from the competition. Violence flared again at the final whistle; Glöckner required a police escort from the pitch, Yugoslavia midfielder Jurica Jerković had a physical altercation with a Welsh fan who had run onto the pitch, and another Welsh fan was arrested after a corner flag, thrown in anger at the referee, struck a policeman in the neck.

The scenes against Yugoslavia provoked widespread condemnation from the football community. Wales initially received a two-year ban from international football, although this was later reduced to a fine of 20,000 Swiss francs and the limitation of home qualifying matches for UEFA Euro 1980 being held at least 200 kilometres (120 mi) from Cardiff. The side's next match was a 2–0 friendly loss to West Germany at Ninian Park in October 1976 which drew only 14,000 spectators, despite West Germany being the reigning World Cup holders. In response, Trevor Morris questioned Ninian Park's viability as an international venue. Wales did not return to Cardiff for nearly two years, although the decision was partly taken out of the FAW's hands when the Safety of Sports Grounds Act was introduced in 1977, revoking the public-safety certificates of Ninian Park and the Racecourse, and considerably reducing the capacity of both. As a result of the restrictions and with the possibility of large gate receipts, Scotland's October 1977 visit was moved to Anfield in Liverpool by the FAW; it was the first Welsh home match held outside the country since 1890. Despite promises to the contrary, Wales fans were outnumbered when the ticket-selling system was exploited by Scottish fans who travelled to Wales to buy them in bulk. A number of Welsh fans also lost their tickets in muggings outside the ground, and FAW president Terry Squire lost his ticket to a pickpocket. Scotland midfielder Lou Macari later said that the decision to move the match outside Wales benefited the Scots, who won 2–0: "If the Welsh FA had not moved the game, then history may have been oh, so different."

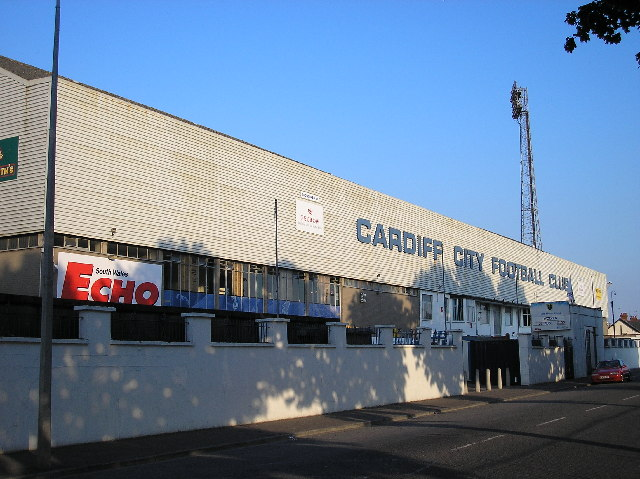
Ninian Park (pictured in 2005) hosted 62,634 fans for a match against England in 1959, a record which stood for over 40 years.

Wales returned to Ninian Park in 1978, where ongoing safety improvements had allowed 25,000 fans to attend a match against England. The UEFA sanction was further reduced to only two Euro 1980 qualifiers played away from Cardiff: matches against Malta and Turkey at the end of 1978. Although the side's next match against West Germany was no longer subject to the ban, it was originally scheduled at the Racecourse. Wrexham officials began a ticket-sales drive for the Turkey match in an attempt to convince the FAW to remain at the ground, with 12,000 tickets proving sufficient to keep the fixture. The FAW made a record £100,000 profit from the West Germany match; although the attendance was 30,000, most of the income was derived from newly negotiated commercial and broadcasting deals.

The early 1980s saw sporadic crowd numbers for the national side; football hooliganism was widespread, as club rivalries, including the South Wales derby between Cardiff City and Swansea City, carried over into international matches. Wales manager Mike England occasionally sternly criticised his side's supporters, and matches were frequently moved between grounds in the hope of generating more interest. Trevor Morris favoured matches at Vetch Field after voicing his frustration at low attendances for matches at Ninian Park and the Racecourse, including Wales's 3–0 victory over Northern Ireland in May 1982, which set a post-war low-attendance record of 2,315. The British Home Championship was discontinued in 1984 after 100 years, with falling crowd numbers cited as a main reason. The decision cost the FAW one of its main revenue streams, as the organisation lost about £80,000 in TV broadcasting rights alone. Wales's final match in the competition was a 1–1 draw with Northern Ireland at Vetch Field, which was attended by 7,845 fans.

The side had a much-improved qualifying campaign for the 1986 FIFA World Cup, and entered the final two matches with a chance of reaching the tournament finals. A 3–0 victory over Spain at the Racecourse left Wales tied with Scotland, with one match to play; the sides were due to meet in the final match. The victory against Spain was Wales's eighth consecutive undefeated match at the Racecourse, and most of the Welsh players were eager to return to North Wales for the deciding fixture. The FAW—which was experiencing severe financial difficulties—hoped to generate the largest possible income from the match, however, and unexpectedly announced the National Stadium, the new home of the Welsh rugby union side built on the site of the Arms Park, (Note: The National Stadium was built alongside the original Arms Park rugby ground and was often still referred to as part of Cardiff Arms Park.) as the venue. Although the Welsh Rugby Union (WRU) had initially agreed to the deal, it eventually backed out due to concerns about possible hooliganism. The FAW then chose Ninian Park, which could accommodate 12,000 more spectators than the Racecourse at the time. Needing a win, Wales drew 1–1 with the Scots and failed to qualify. The match was overshadowed by the death of Scotland manager Jock Stein, who collapsed with a heart attack on the touch-line after his side's equalising goal. The £200,000 generated by the two matches kept the FAW solvent for the next several years. Despite its financial problems, the FAW donated its gate receipts from a friendly with Sweden in April 1989 to a benefit fund for victims of the Hillsborough disaster. Swansea City also had severe financial problems which left Vetch Field in disrepair, and the ground hosted its final international fixture on 19 October 1988 against Finland. Wales's penultimate 1980s match, against West Germany, revived a move to the National Stadium. The match, the first international in Britain played in an all-seater stadium, ended in a goalless draw. It raised more than £250,000 for the FAW, and the venue was praised by the players and manager Terry Yorath.

=== Search for a new home (1990–present) ===
After defeating Belgium at the National Stadium in 1990, the FAW signed a deal with the WRU to host matches at the stadium for £50,000 per fixture. The decision to move the UEFA Euro 1992 qualifying match to the National Stadium because of concerns that necessary safety improvements at Ninian Park would not be completed in time was controversial, and FAW secretary Alun Evans alluded to matches between Belgium and the Home Nations being deemed "sensitive" after the 1985 Heysel Stadium disaster. Although Cardiff City threatened legal action over the decision, saying that the club could "meet any deadline" to complete the work, the game went ahead at the National Stadium. Matches became more frequent at the new venue, and a fixture against Germany attracted more than 37,000 fans; only 3,656 had attended Wales's previous match, against Iceland at Ninian Park. The FAW pushed ahead with developing the ground for future matches, installing floodlights at a cost of £400,000 with a Football Trust grant. Wales played Romania in a crucial qualifying match for the 1994 FIFA World Cup the following year, needing a win to reach the finals; however, the side suffered their first defeat at the site of the National Stadium since its original incarnation in 1910. The match was marred by the death of a Welsh supporter who was struck by a marine flare fired from the opposite side of the ground.

During the late 1990s, plans for the redevelopment of the National Stadium were considered. The ground's capacity was reduced after the publication of the Taylor Report, requiring the replacement of standing areas with seated sections. The WRU was also concerned that the stadium was being overshadowed by other rugby venues such as Twickenham and Murrayfield. When work began, the national side was forced to look for another venue. Ninian Park hosted a friendly against Jamaica, but the FAW were reluctant to keep qualifying matches for UEFA Euro 2000 at the ground because of its limited seating capacity. Despite the Welsh players voting for Ninian Park, the FAW decided to move matches against Italy in 1998 and Denmark the following year to Anfield to maximise revenue. Wales returned to Ninian Park for the side's next match, a 3–2 victory over Belarus, the final international match at the ground which hosted 88 matches in 88 years. The victory over Belarus saw the Welsh team lobby the FAW to play the match against Denmark at Ninian Park. Although the FAW agreed, Danish authorities complained to UEFA that they should receive the same treatment as the Italians to attract their planned 4,000 fans, who could not be accommodated at Ninian Park. The decision to move the tie was criticised by Wales assistant manager Graham Williams, who called it "shocking", and FAW president John Owen Hughes, who said: "They are entitled to ten per cent (of a stadium's capacity), not a set figure". Despite Wales's resistance to the move, the match was played at Anfield and the Danes won 2–0. It attracted only 10,000 spectators, despite Denmark's claim that it had a large following.

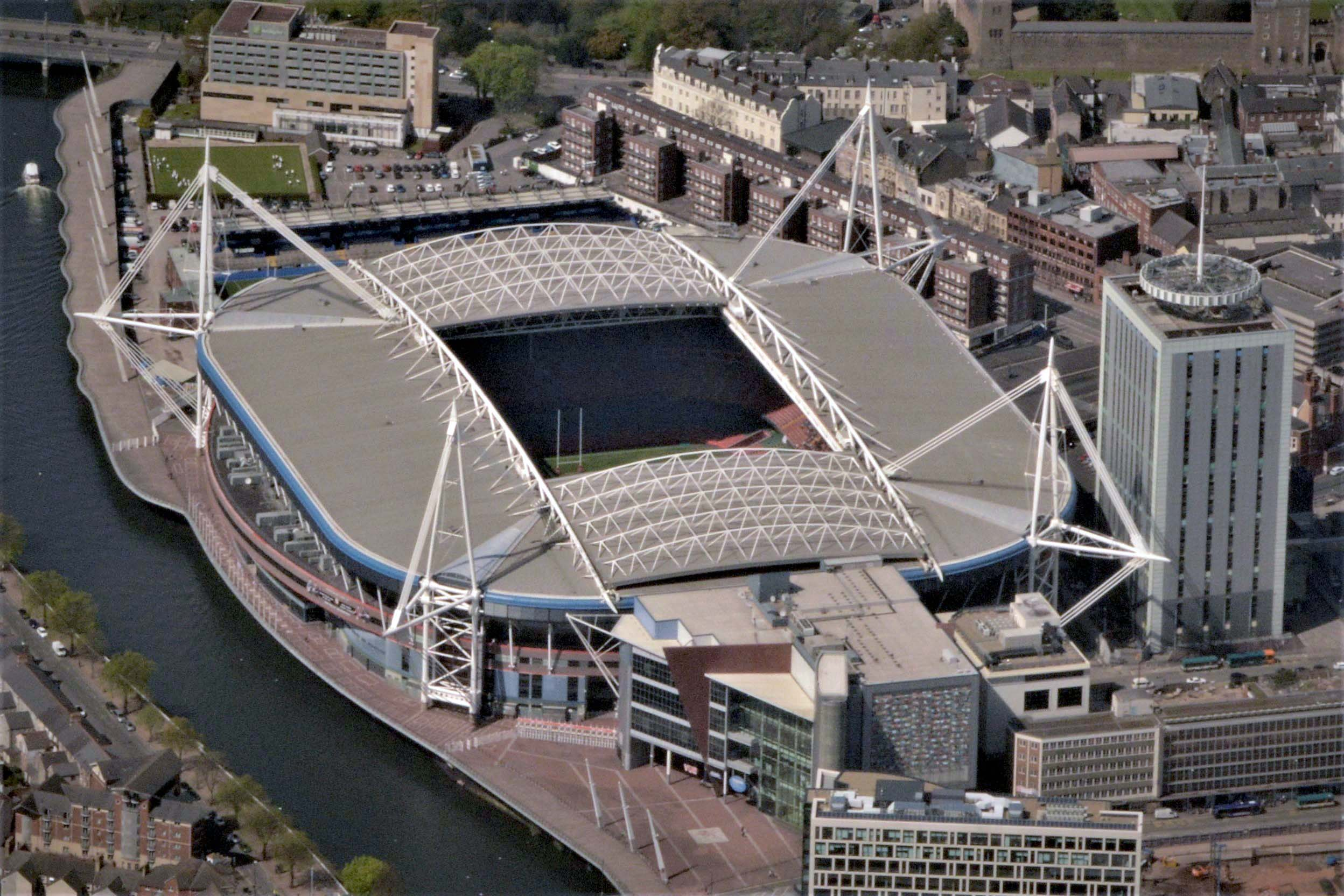
The Millennium Stadium, opened in 2000, holds the attendance record for a Wales home international.

The National Stadium's replacement, eventually named the Millennium Stadium, opened in 1999 at a cost of £121 million, including a contribution from the FAW. With a capacity of 74,500, the stadium immediately became the new home venue for Welsh football matches. The FAW signed an initial 21-year lease to play at the ground, based on three matches per calendar year at a cost of £100,000 per fixture. The Millennium Stadium hosted its first international match on 29 March 2000 against Finland which, due to the new stadium's increased capacity, set an attendance record for a Wales international match of 65,614. Two months later, Wales played a friendly against Brazil which was the first home match attended by more than 70,000 spectators.

The Millennium Stadium attracted large crowds for several years, boosted by Wales's success during the qualifying stage for UEFA Euro 2004. After finishing as runners-up in the initial group stage behind Italy, Wales met Russia in a two-legged playoff for a place at the finals. After a goalless draw in the first leg, a 1–0 defeat in the second leg attracted a record crowd for a Wales home match of 73,062. By the end of the decade, the ground experienced a dramatic drop in attendance for international matches due to poor Welsh results in qualifying competitions; this led to calls from several senior figures in Welsh football, including national team manager John Toshack and players such as Jason Koumas and Craig Bellamy, to move matches to another venue. The FAW experimented with the Liberty Stadium (Swansea City's replacement for Vetch Field) for a goalless draw with Slovenia. Matches also returned to the Racecourse, and two friendlies were held at Parc y Scarlets in Llanelli in 2009 and 2010; they were relatively unsuccessful, however, and both latter matches attracted less than 5,000 spectators. In November 2009, the Cardiff City Stadium (Cardiff City's replacement for Ninian Park) hosted its first international match with a 3–0 victory against Scotland.

Plans were announced in July 2010 to move three of Wales's four upcoming home matches during the qualifying stage of UEFA Euro 2012 from the Millennium Stadium, the first qualifying matches to be played away from the ground since it opened. The first match against Bulgaria was held at the Cardiff City Stadium but, after losing the first two fixtures, the FAW played a match against England at the Millennium to boost revenue. With average crowds remaining low, Wales chose to play matches at the Cardiff City Stadium. The decision was cited as a major factor in the team's success in qualifying for UEFA Euro 2016, Wales's first major international tournament since 1958. Although the Cardiff City Stadium remained the main venue for the national side, Wales played Spain in October 2018 at the Millennium Stadium due to ticket demand exceeding the Cardiff City Stadium's capacity; this increased the likelihood of the Millennium hosting future matches against sides likely to draw larger crowds. Wales played a friendly against Trinidad and Tobago on 20 March 2019 at the Racecourse, their first North Wales match in eleven years.

== Primary Venue ==
| Year: | 1877–1900 | 1933–1970, 1997–1999 | 1990–1996 | 2000–2009 | 2010– | 1900–1932, 1970–1990 |
|---|---|---|---|---|---|---|
| Venue: | | | | | | |
| Venue: | Racecourse Ground | Ninian Park | National Stadium | Millennium Stadium | Cardiff City Stadium | Alternating venues |

== List of venues ==
Home venues
| Number of matches | Stadium | First international | Opponent | Last international | Opponent |
|---|---|---|---|---|---|
| 95 | Racecourse Ground, Wrexham | 5 March 1877 | Scotland | 11 October 2023 | Gibraltar |
| 88 | Ninian Park, Cardiff | 6 March 1911 | Scotland | 13 October 1998 | Belarus |
| 67 | Cardiff City Stadium, Cardiff | 14 November 2009 | Scotland | 17 November 2026 | Portugal |
| 38 | Millennium Stadium, Cardiff | 29 March 2000 | Finland | 11 October 2018 | Spain |
| 20 | The National Stadium, Cardiff | 31 May 1989 | West Germany | 29 March 1997 | Belgium |
| 17 | Vetch Field, Swansea | 9 April 1921 | Ireland | 19 October 1988 | Finland |
| 9 | Liberty Stadium, Swansea | 17 August 2005 | Slovenia | 9 September 2025 | Canada |
| 6 | The Arms Park, Cardiff | 16 March 1896 | England | 14 March 1910 | England |
| 3 | Anfield, Liverpool | 12 October 1977 | Scotland | 9 June 1999 | Denmark |
| 3 | Parc y Scarlets, Llanelli | 29 May 2009 | Estonia | 15 August 2012 | Bosnia and Herzegovina |
| 2 | The Oval, Llandudno | 19 February 1898 | Ireland | 24 February 1900 | Ireland |
| 1 | Aberdare Athletic Ground, Aberdare | 11 April 1908 | Ireland | 11 April 1908 | Ireland |
| 1 | Cricket Ground, Bangor | 21 March 1904 | Ireland | 21 March 1904 | Ireland |
| 1 | Old Racecourse, Shrewsbury | 8 February 1890 | Ireland | 8 February 1890 | Ireland |
| 1 | Penrhyn Park, Bangor | 27 February 1892 | Ireland | 27 February 1892 | Ireland |
| 1 | St. Helen's, Swansea | 24 February 1894 | Ireland | 24 February 1894 | Ireland |
