= Albert Thomas Davies =

Welsh footballer

Albert Davies
Personal information
- Date of birth: 1869
- Place of birth: England
- Date of death: 1940 (aged 70–71)
- Position: Forward

Senior career*
Years	Team	Apps	(Gls)
- Shrewsbury Town

International career
1891	Wales	1	(1)
- * Club domestic league appearances and goals

Albert Davies (1869 – 1940) was a Welsh international football player. He was part of the Wales national football team, playing 1 match and scoring 1 goal on 7 February 1891 against Ireland. At club level, he played for Shrewsbury Town.

== See also ==
- List of Wales international footballers (alphabetical)
