= Thomas Chapman (footballer) =

English/Welsh footballer

Personal information
- Date of birth: 1871
- Place of birth: Newtown, Wales
- Date of death: 1929 (aged 57–58)
- Place of death: Chatham, England
- Height: 5 ft 10 in (1.78 m)
- Position: Half back

Senior career*
Years	Team	Apps	(Gls)
1890–1895	Newtown		
1895–1896	Manchester City	26	(3)
1896–1898	Grimsby Town	51	(0)
1898–1901	Chatham Town		
1901–1907	Maidstone United		

International career
1894–1897	Wales	7	(2)
- * Club domestic league appearances and goals

Thomas Chapman (1871–1929) was a Welsh professional footballer. He began his career with Newtown before joining Football League side Manchester City and Grimsby Town. He joined Chatham Town in 1898 but was forced to move on when the club folded in 1901. He later spent several season with Maidstone United. He also earned seven caps for Wales between 1894 and 1897.

== Career ==
Born in Newtown, Powys, Chapman began his career with his hometown side Newtown in 1890. He spent five years at the club, helping the side to victory in the 1895 Welsh Cup final in a 3–2 win over Wrexham. In 1895, he joined Football League side Manchester City, becoming the first former Newtown player to play in the league. At City, he joined up with fellow Welshman Billy Meredith who described Chapman as "a capital centre-half who never knew when he was beaten". He spent one season with City, making 26 league appearances and scoring 3 times.

Chapman signed for Grimsby Town in 1896, making 51 appearances in two years. During his time with Grimsby, he became one of the club's first international players when he and teammate Hugh Morris played in a 4–0 defeat to England in 1897. He dropped out of the Football League to join Chatham Town in 1898. He spent three years with Chatham but was forced to move on when the club suffered financial difficulties and folded in 1901. He subsequently joined Maidstone United where he finished his career in March 1907.

During his career, Chapman won seven caps for the Wales national football team. He made his debut in 1894, playing in all three of his countries' fixtures during the 1893–94 British Home Championship. He won his final cap in 1897 against England.
