= John Morgan (footballer, born 1854) =

Welsh footballer

Personal information
- Full name: John Richard Morgan
- Date of birth: 1 October 1854
- Place of birth: Llansamlet, Swansea, Wales
- Date of death: 11 April 1937 (aged 83)
- Place of death: Bath, England
- Position: Full back

Senior career*
| Years | Team | Apps | (Gls) |
| 1874–1877 | Cambridge University | | |
| | Notts County | 0 | (0) |
| 1877–1883 | Derby School | | |

International career
| 1877–1883 | Wales | 10 | (2) |
- * Club domestic league appearances and goals

John Richard Morgan (1 October 1854 – 11 April 1937) was a Welsh international footballer who earned ten caps between 1877 and 1883.

Born at Llansamlet, near Swansea, Glamorgan, where his father, the Rev. Morgan Rice Morgan, was Vicar. He was educated at Oundle School and St John's School, Leatherhead, and from 1874 to 1878 studied at Jesus College, Cambridge. where he was awarded in 1877 a Blue for Association Football. He was Assistant Master at Park House School, Reading; Derby School, 1879–1883; and Somersetshire College, Bath. In 1885 he founded with his wife, Katherine Emily Bennett (1887-1942), Connaught House Preparatory School in Weymouth, Dorset. He retired in 1920 and died on 11 April 1937 at 13, Somerset Place, Bath, and was buried at Lansdown Cemetery, Bath, Somerset.
