= Thomas Breckenridge =

Scottish footballer

Thomas Breckenridge (26 February 1865 – 3 May 1898) was a Scottish footballer from Edinburgh, who played for Heart of Midlothian, Leith Athletic and Scotland.

Breckenridge was the son of Alexander Breckenridge, a leather merchant, and Janet Russell. He later worked as a bookbinder in Edinburgh, where he died, aged 33, of "general paralysis".
