= Robert Albert Jones =

Welsh footballer

Albert Jones
Personal information
- Date of birth: 1864
- Place of birth: Wales

International career
Years	Team	Apps	(Gls)
1884–1885	Wales	4	(2)

Albert Jones (born 1864) was a Welsh international footballer. He was part of the Wales national football team between 1884 and 1885, playing 4 matches and scoring 2 goals. He played his first match on 9 February 1884 against Ireland and his last match on 23 March 1885 against Scotland.

== See also ==
- List of Wales international footballers (alphabetical)
