= John Buchanan (Cambuslang footballer) =

Scottish footballer

John Buchanan was a Scottish footballer, who played for Cambuslang and Scotland.
