= Thomas McKeown (footballer) =

Scottish footballer

Personal information
- Full name: Thomas Michael McKeown
- Date of birth: 24 January 1869
- Place of birth: Dalmellington, Scotland
- Date of death: 25 October 1903 (aged 34)
- Place of death: Glasgow, Scotland
- Position: Full back

Senior career*
Years	Team	Apps	(Gls)
–1888	Hibernian	0	(0)
1888–1891	Celtic	14	(0)
1891–1892	Blackburn Rovers	19	(0)
Total		33	(0)

International career
1889–1890	Scotland	2	(0)
- * Club domestic league appearances and goals

Thomas Michael McKeown (24 January 1869 – 25 October 1903) was a Scottish footballer who played for Hibernian, Celtic, Blackburn Rovers and Scotland. He died of asphyxia in 1903.
