= William Pryce-Jones =

Welsh footballer

William Ernest Pryce-Jones
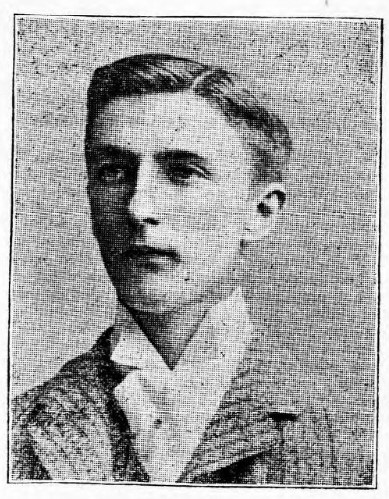
- Photo of Pryce-Jones, c. 1895

Personal information
- Date of birth: 29 December 1867
- Place of birth: Newtown, Wales
- Date of death: March 14, 1949 (aged 81)
- Place of death: Tywyn, Wales
- Position: Forward

Senior career*
Years	Team	Apps	(Gls)
1886–1890	Cambridge University		
1891–1899	Newtown		

International career
1887–1890	Wales	5	(3)
- * Club domestic league appearances and goals

William Ernest Pryce-Jones (29 December 1867 – 14 March 1949) was a Welsh international footballer.

He was born at Newtown, Montgomeryshire and educated at Shrewsbury School and Cambridge University. He died at Tywyn, Merionethshire. He was the son of Sir Pryce Pryce-Jones, a former Conservative member of the British House of Commons.

He was part of the Wales national football team between 1887 and 1890, playing five matches and scoring three goals. He played his first match on 21 March 1887 against Scotland whilst a Cambridge University player. His last match was on 8 February 1890 against Ireland.

In 1895 he captained Newtown to Welsh Cup victory. He appeared alongside his brother Albert Westhead Pryce-Jones who was also an international footballer for Wales.

He also played county cricket for Montgomeryshire, and between 1888 and 1896 for Shropshire while playing club for the Royal Welsh Warehouse at Newtown.

He served with the South Wales Borderers from 1897 to 1902, and later worked for his family wool manufacturer until 1937.

== See also ==
- List of Wales international footballers (alphabetical)
