= Richard Jarrett =

Welsh footballer

Personal information
- Date of birth: 9 October 1870
- Place of birth: Wales

International career
Years	Team	Apps	(Gls)
1889–1890	Wales	2	(3)

Richard Jarrett (born 9 October 1870) was a Welsh international footballer. He was part of the Wales national football team between 1889 and 1890, playing 2 matches and scoring 3 goals. He played his first match on 27 April 1889 against Ireland. In this game he scored a hattrick and Wales won with 3–0. He played his last match on 22 March 1890 against Scotland.

== See also ==
- List of Wales international footballers (alphabetical)
- List of Wales national football team hat-tricks
