= Neil Munro (footballer) =

Scottish footballer (1868–1948)

Neil Munro (25 January 1868 – 4 September 1948) was a Scottish footballer who played for Abercorn and Scotland.
