= Edmund Howell =

Welsh footballer

Edmund Gwynne Howell
Personal information
- Date of birth: 1867
- Place of birth: Wales

Senior career*
Years	Team	Apps	(Gls)
1884-1891	Builth Wells		

International career
1888–1891	Wales	3	(3)
- * Club domestic league appearances and goals

Edmund Howell (born 1867) was a Welsh international footballer. He was part of the Wales national football team between 1888 and 1891, playing 3 matches and scoring 3 goals. He played his first match on 3 March 1888 against Ireland and his last match on 7 March 1891 against England.

== See also ==
- List of Wales international footballers (alphabetical)
