= Alexandra Recreation Ground =

Multi-sport venue in Crewe, England

- Nantwich Road
- Interactive map of Alexandra Recreation Ground
- Location: Crewe, England
- Coordinates: 53.0884°N 2.4356°W
- Surface: Grass
- Record attendance: 7,000

Construction
- Opened: 1877
- Closed: 1896

Tenant
- Crewe Alexandra

The Alexandra Recreation Ground, also known as Nantwich Road, was a multi-sport venue in Crewe in England. Opened in 1877, it was the home ground of Crewe Alexandra for 19 years, and also hosted an FA Cup semi-final and the 1886-87 Welsh Cup final, both in 1887, and an England home match in 1888.

== History ==
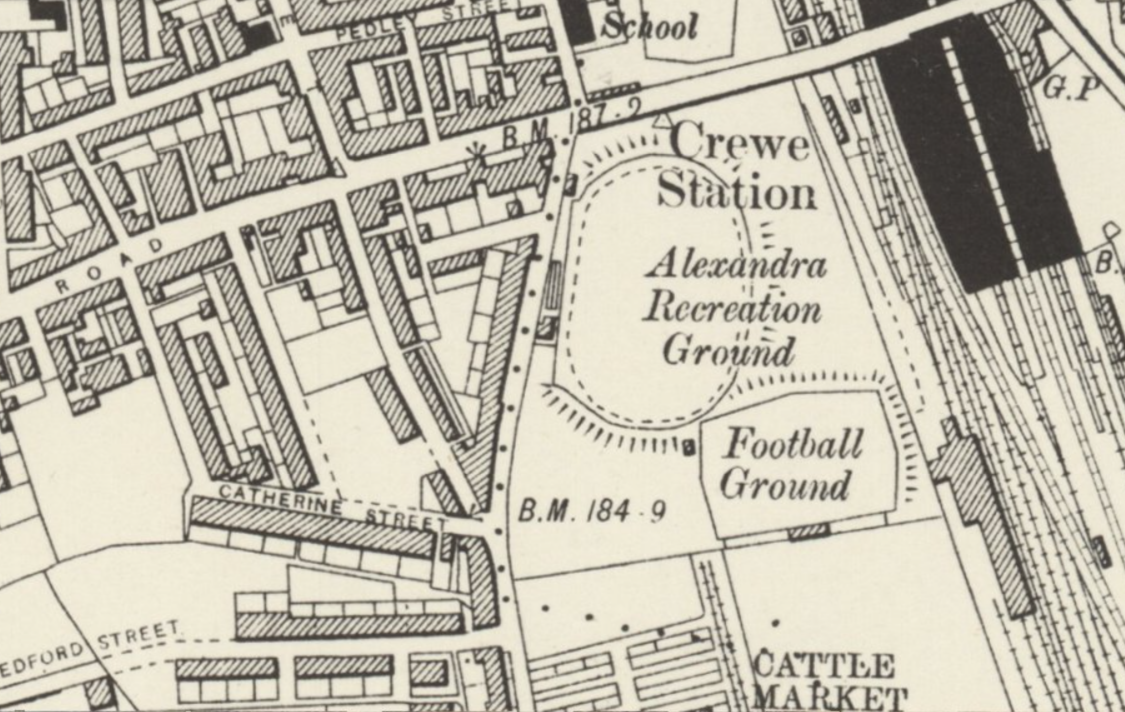
Detail of 1888 OS map showing Alexandra Recreation Ground in Crewe, with the first football ground to the southeast

The ground was opened in 1877 as the Royal Hotel Recreation Ground, and was used for athletics, cricket, cycle racing and football. An oval ground, it had a stand around 100 feet long on the western side and banking around the remainder of the pitch. To open the ground, Crewe Alexandra cricket club (established in September 1866 by employees of Crewe locomotive works, and named after Princess Alexandra; the related Crewe Alexandra Athletic Club was founded in 1867) hosted an athletics festival, which raised £75 and subsequently became a prominent meeting in the Northern athletics calendar. In August 1877, the cricket club formed a football division.

In July 1878, the ground hosted a cricket match between a team from Crewe and an Australia XI, during the inaugural first-class tour of England by a representative overseas side. The visitors won by 99 runs.

In the 1886–87 season the ground was the venue of the FA Cup semi-final between Aston Villa and Rangers, with the attendance of 7,000 probably being the ground record. On 16 April 1887 the ground was used for the Welsh Cup final between Chirk and Davenham. An attendance of 1,500 witnessed Chirk win 2–1. On 4 February 1888 the ground hosted the opening match of the 1887–88 British Home Championship, which saw England beat Wales 5–1.

In 1891, the Crewe Alexandra football club split away from the cricket club, becoming founder members of the Football League Second Division in 1892; the first Football League match played at the ground was on 10 September 1892 when Crewe defeated Grimsby Town 1–0 in front of 2,000 spectators. The last match at the ground was played on 28 March 1896, with Liverpool's 7–0 win on the day also being Crewe's record home defeat at the ground. However, it was not Crewe's last home league match of the season, which was played at the Vicarage in the nearby town of Sandbach. Crewe were voted out of the Football League at the end of the 1895–96 season, and subsequently played at several different grounds (including Edleston Road and Old Sheds Field) until returning to the area to play at the original football ground east of Gresty Road in 1897.

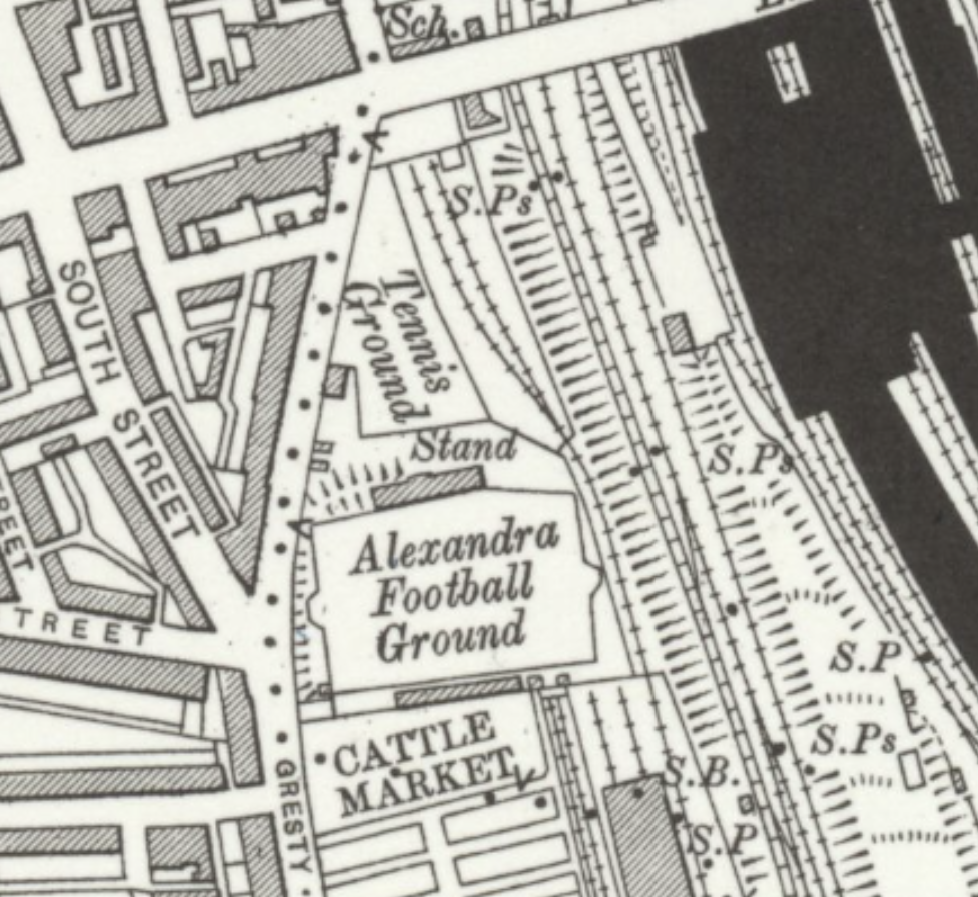
1911 Ordnance Survey map showing Alexandra Football Ground

The Alexandra Recreation Ground closed in 1898 to provide land for the expansion of the neighbouring railway station. It is now the site of the Rail House office building, a car park and part of the modern Gresty Road stadium. With support from prominent local railway engineer Francis Webb, a new cricket ground, encircled by a cycling and athletics track, was provided in a new stadium to the north, off Earle Street, in 1898. The new venue was also later used for speedway racing by Crewe Kings. Crewe Alexandra moved to its modern-day location, immediately adjacent to Gresty Road, in 1906.
