= Job Wilding =

Welsh footballer

Personal information
- Date of birth: 1862
- Place of birth: Wrexham, Wales
- Date of death: 15 March 1947 (aged 84–85)
- Place of death: Hoole, Chester, England
- Position: Forward

Senior career*
Years	Team	Apps	(Gls)
- Wrexham Olympic
1886	Everton		
1886	Bootle		
1888	Wrexham		
1891	Wrexham Victoria		
1895–1897	Westminster Rovers		
1900	Wrexham		

International career
1885–1892	Wales	9	(4)
- * Club domestic league appearances and goals

Job Wilding (1862 – 15 March 1947) was a Welsh professional footballer who played as a forward. He was among the first full-time professional football players in England.

He made his international debut for the Wales national team on 14 March 1885, in the Wales versus England match at Leamington Road, Blackburn. He was also Everton F.C.'s first player to represent Wales at full international level.
