= Racecourse Ground =

Football stadium in Wrexham, Wales

- Y Cae Ras (Welsh)
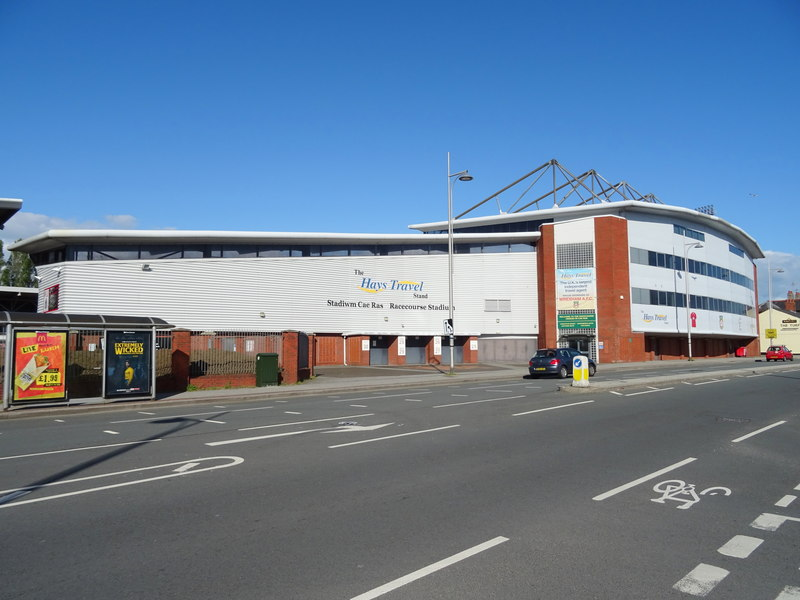
- Interactive map of Racecourse Ground
- Full name: Racecourse Ground; Y Cae Ras (Welsh)
- Former names: My Racecourse; Wrexham Glyndŵr University Racecourse Stadium
- Location: Mold Road, Wrexham, Wales LL11 2AH
- Coordinates: 53°3′7″N 3°0′13″W
- Owner: Wrexham A.F.C. (since 29 June 2022)
- Operator: Wrexham A.F.C.
- Capacity: 10,771 (Football)
- Surface: GrassMaster
- Field size: 102 m × 68 m (335 ft × 223 ft)
- Public transit: Wrexham General (0.3 mi)

Construction
- Opened: 1807, 1864 for football
- Cost: £3,500,000 (Mold Road Stand)
- Architect: Ward McHugh Associates (Yale Stand)

Tenants
- Wrexham A.F.C. (1864–present); Wales national football team (1877–1960; selected matches 1960–present); Wrexham A.F.C. Women (selected matches 2021-present); North Wales Crusaders (2012–2016)

Website
- wrexhamafc.co.uk/supporter-information/stok-cae-ras

The Racecourse Ground (Welsh: Y Cae Ras) is a football stadium in Wrexham, Wales. It is the home of Wrexham Association Football Club, and is the largest stadium in North Wales and the seventh-largest in Wales.

It is the world's oldest international football stadium still hosting international matches, having been the venue for Wales' first home international match in 1877, and has hosted more Wales international matches than any other ground. It is still one of the stadiums used by the Football Association of Wales for home international games.

The ground has also been used by North Wales Crusaders rugby league club, Scarlets rugby union club and Liverpool Reserves. In the early days, the ground was used for cricket and horse racing. It also occasionally hosts concerts.

== History ==
=== Inception (1864–1952) ===
Wrexham Football Club have played at the Racecourse Ground since being formed in the local Turf Hotel public house in October 1864. However, due to an increase in rent from the then owners, Wrexham Cricket Club, Wrexham played their home games in the 1881–82 and 1882–83 seasons at the Recreation Ground in Rhosddu, while also changing their name to Wrexham Athletic for one season. Before the club was formed, the ground was mainly used for cricket and, occasionally, horse racing.

The Racecourse was used extensively for aviation before the First World War, with Gustav Hamel performing public displays in August 1912 and June 1913. Wrexham Borough Council considered making the racecourse the town's municipal airport, but that was later developed at Borras.

=== Initial expansion (1952–2002) ===
1952 saw the laying down of concrete terracing on the Kop end, which is now the oldest part of the ground. Five years later, 34,445 people gathered to witness an FA Cup fourth-round tie against Manchester United, the largest-ever attendance at the Racecourse. On 30 September 1959, the Racecourse saw the switching-on of the newly installed floodlights.

In 1978, after Wrexham was promoted to the former Second Division, the Border Stand was built, taking its name from the Border Breweries which owned the ground. That part of the ground is now known as the Eric Roberts Builders Stand, where visiting supporters are normally seated.

The latest addition to the ground came about in 1999, after Grant Aid from Sport Lot, the Welsh Development Agency and the Football Trust, together with local sponsorship, financed the construction of a stand on the Mold Road side of the ground. The new structure was originally named the Pryce Griffiths Stand, after the then chairman, but was renamed the Mold Road Stand after Griffiths sold the club to Alex Hamilton. The stand has a capacity of 3,500 and also contains hospitality and conferencing facilities. The development also saw the Paddock areas of the Sainsbury's Stand and the Eric Roberts Builders Stand become all-seated, bringing the current capacity up to 15,500, thus permitting international football and rugby union to be played at the Racecourse once again.

=== Controversial ownership (2002–2006) ===
In 2002, then Wrexham F.C. chairman, William Pryce Griffiths, secured a 125-year lease on the Racecourse from Wolverhampton Dudley Breweries, for £750,000 and a peppercorn annual rent of £1. The club hosted TNS vs Liverpool in a UEFA Champions League qualifier in 2005.

On 26 June 2002, the freehold of the Racecourse Ground was acquired by Wrexham A.F.C. from Wolverhampton Dudley Breweries, for £300,000. On the same day, chairman, Alex Hamilton, transferred the ownership of the freehold from Wrexham A.F.C. to another of his companies, Damens Ltd, for a nominal fee. After that controversial change in ownership, the 125-year lease on the Racecourse, held by Wrexham F.C., was renegotiated. The new lease stated that Damens Ltd could evict Wrexham F.C. from the Racecourse Ground upon 12-months' notice and payment of £1,000,000. The new lease also saw the club's annual rent increase from £1 to £30,000.

In 2004, Wrexham F.C. was given a years' notice to quit the ground, which triggered a furious reaction from fans. In a legal case running until March 2006, the High Court ruled that the ownership of the freehold of the ground had been improperly transferred, and ownership reverted to the club's then-administrators, the club having gone into administration in December 2004, with debts of £2,600,000.

=== Transfer to Wrexham Village Ltd (2006–2016) ===
With the club's emergence from administration in May 2006, ownership of the ground passed to a new company, Wrexham Football Club (2006) Ltd, owned by Geoff Moss and Ian Roberts. They transferred the ownership of the ground to a new holding company, Wrexham Village Ltd, which owned both the new football club company, and later purchased the rugby league club, Crusaders, from its owners in Bridgend, South Wales. Thus the new company had two tenants for the stadium.

To make a permanent cash injection into the sporting clubs, Wrexham Village proposed in 2008 a joint venture development with a yet-to-be chosen third party, to develop a student village area near the site of the Kop stand. The £40 million project was to be developed in conjunction with Wrexham University to house over 800 students, and take place in two phases. The club would benefit from either land-lease income, or joint ownership within the development, and hence receive rental income direct from the tenants. However, due to the global recession that year, the company found it hard to find a development partner, and the freehold of the land, along with the development plans, was eventually sold in 2009 to another company owned by Moss and Roberts.

In August 2011, after a period of instability at Wrexham Village Ltd, which owned the stadium and both the football and rugby league clubs, the company agreed to sell the stadium and associated training grounds to Wrexham University (then known as Glyndŵr University). The proposed deal, subject to financial terms agreed by both parties, would allow both sporting teams to continue using the facilities. The purchase of the ground also resulted in the re-branding of the stadium, incorporating the university's name.

On 19 May 2014, work began at the Racecourse, which included a new pitch and sprinkler system, and changing rooms for players and officials. The medical and treatment facilities were also upgraded, together with improved seating for disabled supporters, better floodlighting and removal of cambers at the Kop end of the ground. That meant the stadium was reclassified to Category 3 level, meaning it was able to host international football matches.

=== University ownership (2016–2022) ===
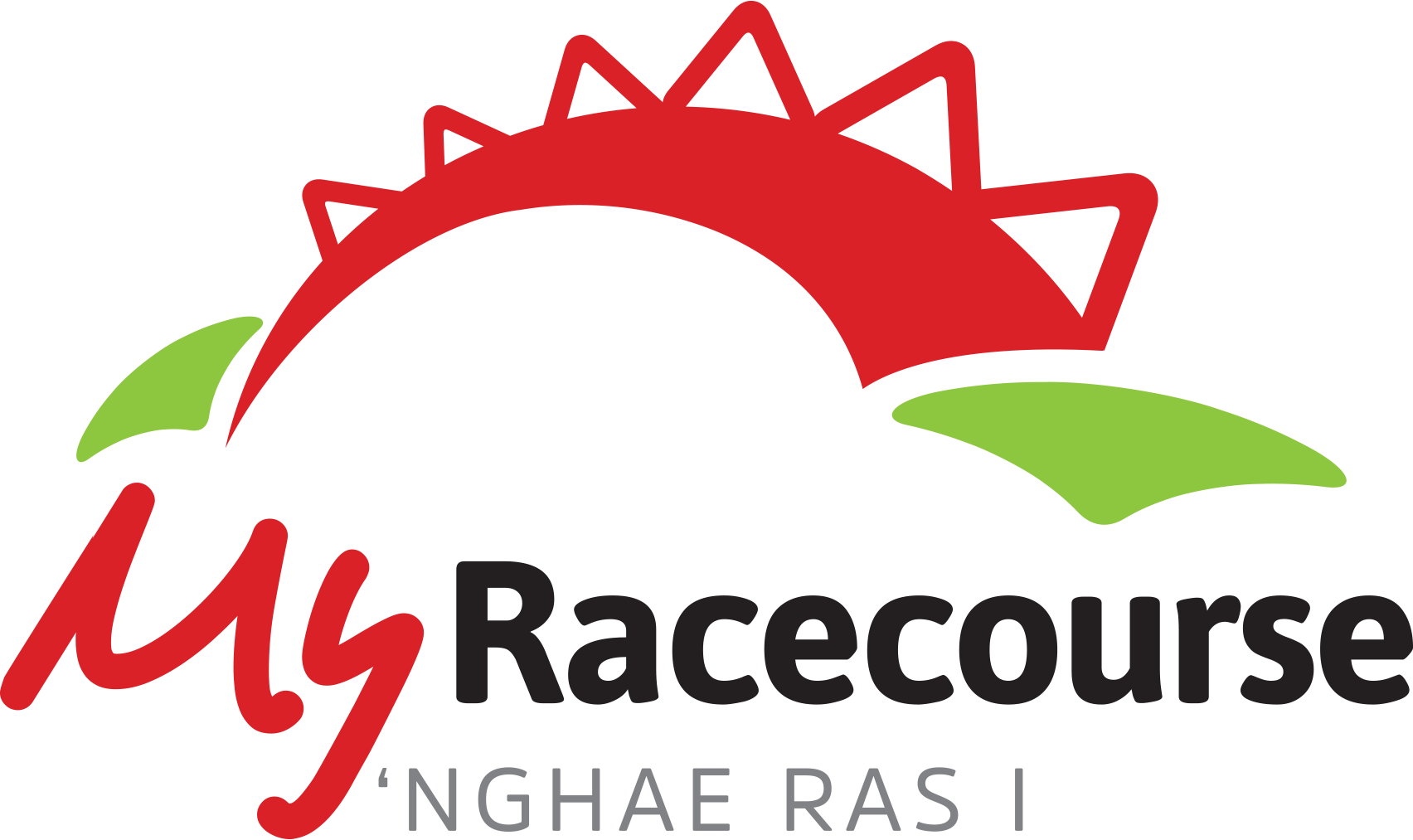
Logo used during Wrexham Glyndŵr University freehold lease.

In August 2016, Wrexham University and Wrexham A.F.C. signed a contract that signalled a new future for the Racecourse. The lease from the university was branded as "My Racecourse" (Welsh: 'Nghae Ras I).

The university, having saved the ground from possible extinction, handed operational control to the football club as part a 99-year lease.

=== Club ownership, sponsorship rebranding (2022–present) ===
After the takeover by Ryan Reynolds and Rob McElhenney, the club began talks with Wrexham University to purchase the freehold of the ground. On 29 June 2022, the club purchased the freehold of the stadium from the university.

In 2022, Wrexham Council launched a stadium redevelopment bid to be partly funded by the "levelling up" fund, a UK Government initiative aiming at increasing public investment outside south-east England. The construction of a new Kop stand, improved media, broadcast, and floodlight facilities, a car park, and groundworks for a future convention centre and hotel were presented as enabling the return of competitive Wales national football fixtures. Former Wales footballers Mickey Thomas and Malcolm Allen served as figureheads for the bid.

On 25 May 2023, it was announced that, following a three-year sponsorship deal with STōK Cold Brew Coffee, the stadium was to be known by the sponsorship name "STōK Cae Ras", also referred as the "STōK Racecourse" in English. The sponsorship name was officially adopted on 1 July 2023. It was also referred to in Welsh as Cae Ras STōK. On 16 April 2024, Gatorade is named as official sports drink and as part of partnership will be on sidelines.

On 30 July 2025, planning application submitted for additional 2,250 seats in new Kop Stand.

In August 2025, the club completed a comprehensive £1.7 million pitch overhaul that included the installation of undersoil heating, enhanced drainage systems, and goal-line technology to meet UEFA compliance standards. The renovation also saw the pitch repositioned two metres toward the Kop end and the dugouts relocated to the opposite touchline.

In July 2026, the club and Wrexham Supporter Trust (WST) complete collapse of Racecourse leases. As a condition of the deal, the club paid £187.000 to the Trust, an equivalent amount to that contributed by fans to save the Football Club in 2011, some of which has already been repaid to the fans who provided the funding by the WST.

== Stadium details ==
=== Stands ===
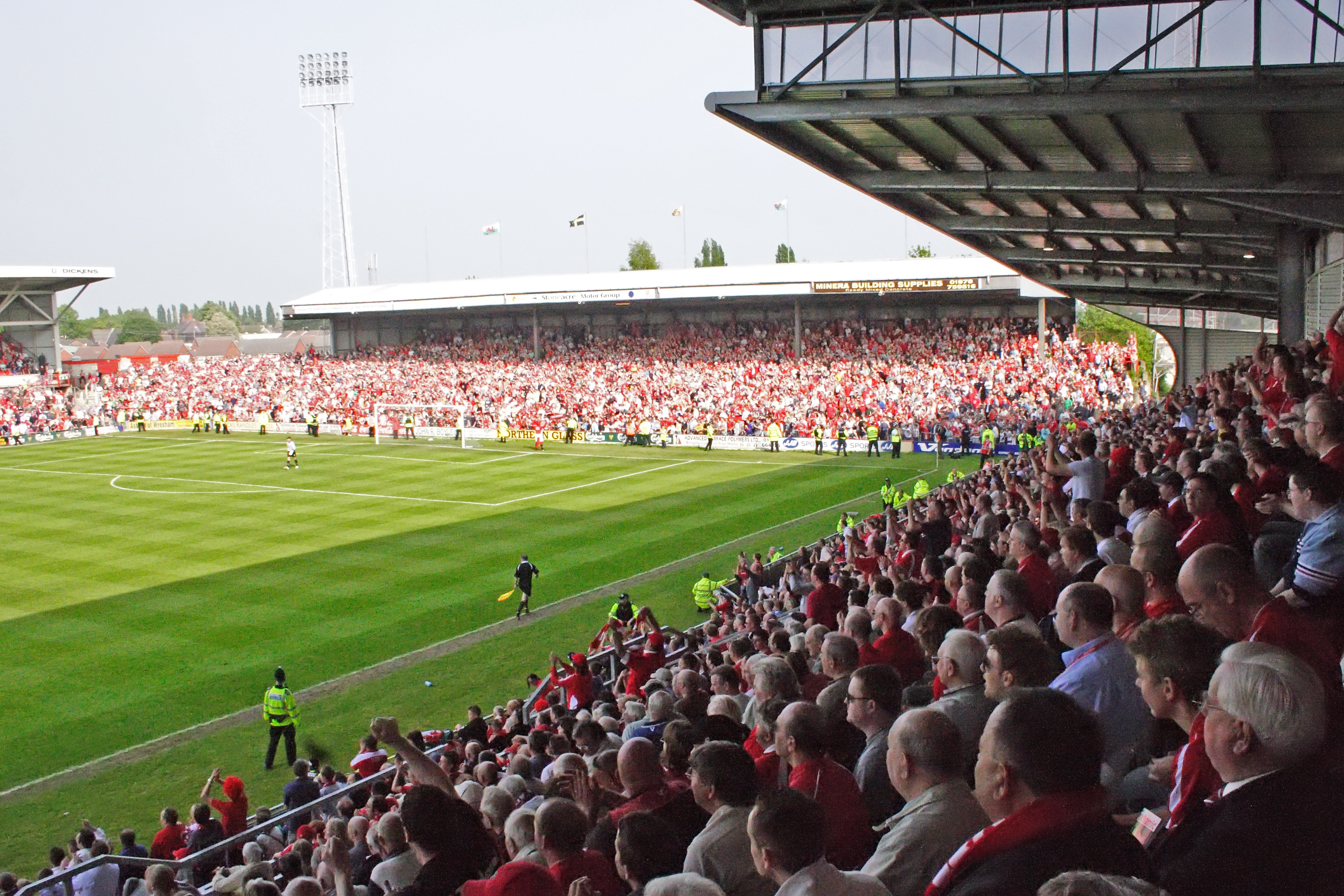
The Kop as seen from the Macron Stand in 2007

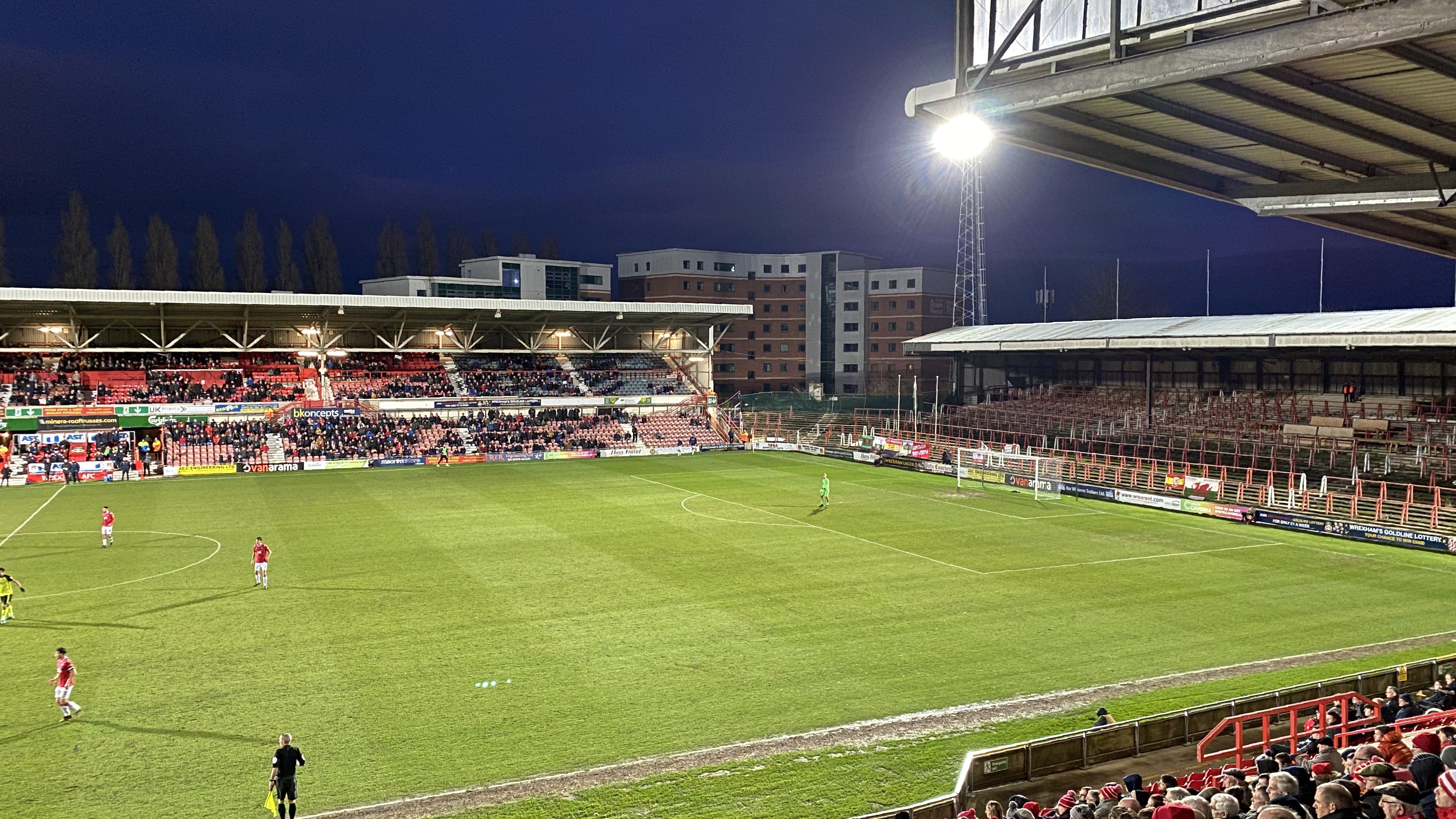
The Kop (right) in 2020

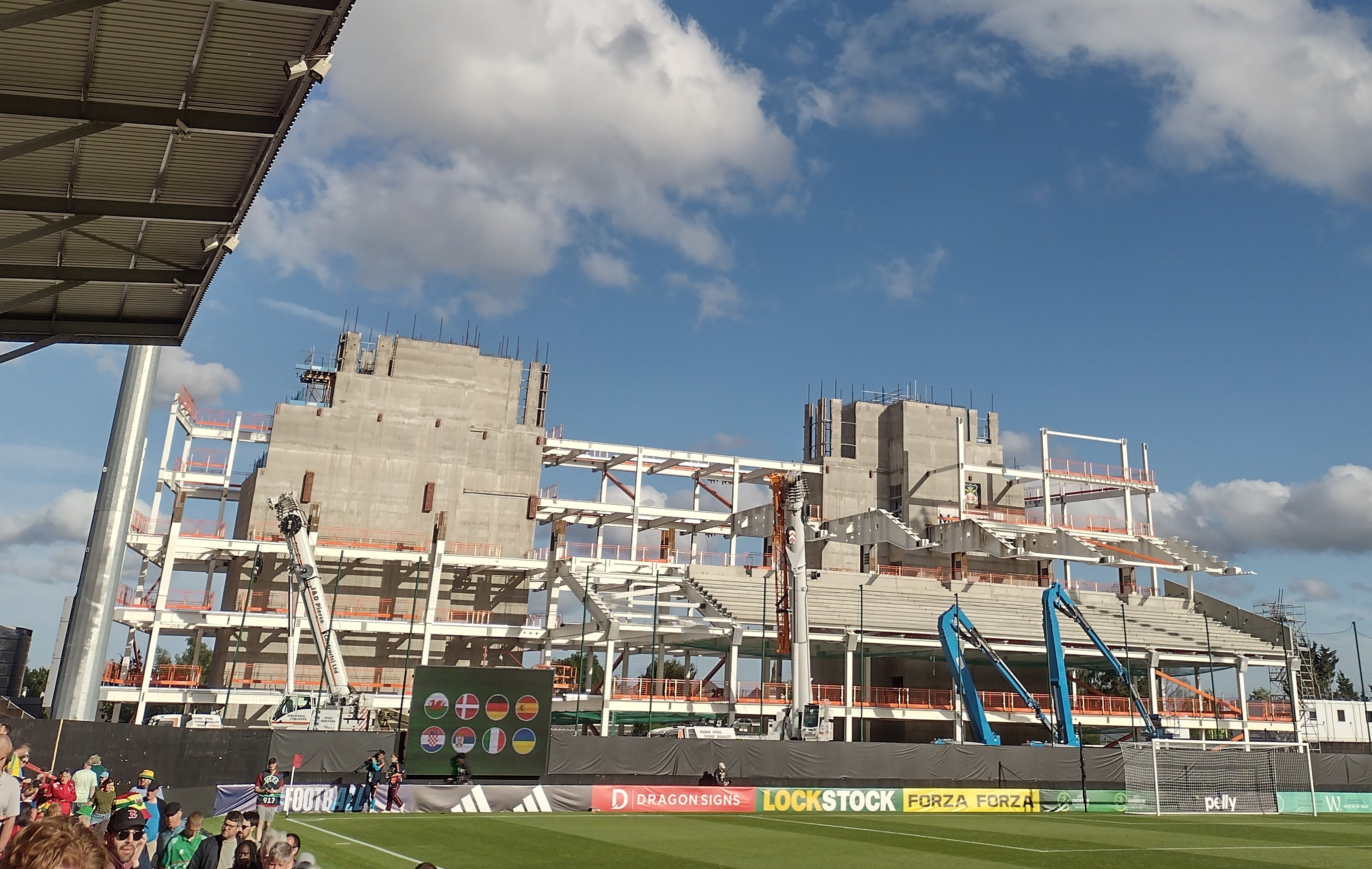
The New Kop under construction in 2026

The Kop
The home stand situated behind the goal was an all-standing terrace named, similar to multiple other grounds in the UK, after the Battle of Spion Kop. Officially it was known as the Crispin Lane End or "Town End." With a capacity of 5,000, the Spion Kop was the largest all-standing terrace in the English Football League. Due to safety concerns, the stand was closed in 2008 and demolished in January 2023 after securing permissions to rebuild.

In November 2022, Wrexham Council's planning committee approved project for a 5,500 capacity all-seater stand with a hospitality lounge, retail and office spaces for the club and its community trust. While initially slated for completion by the 2024-25 season, the timeline got voided due to additional challenges. As a result of increased demand to attend matches, the club set up a temporary Kop stand in time for the fixture against Newport County on 23 December 2023. The temporary stand, called The Four Walls Fourth Wall for sponsorship reasons, allowed access for an additional 2,309 home supporters, of which 20 were wheelchair spaces accessible via Crispin Lane. It was also expanded, peaking at 3,020 spectators during the 2024–25 season.

On 3 March 2025, the rebuild was again approved by the Wrexham County Borough councillors. The club aims to have it ready in time for the 2026/27 season in part due to planned hosting of the UEFA European Under-19 Championship matches. On 30 July 2025, Wrexham submitted revised plans to increase the new Kop Stand capacity to 7,750 seats by adding additional 2,250 seats in the upper tier. The expanded design aims to future-proof the stadium and strengthen its ability to host international fixtures. The construction works started in December 2025.

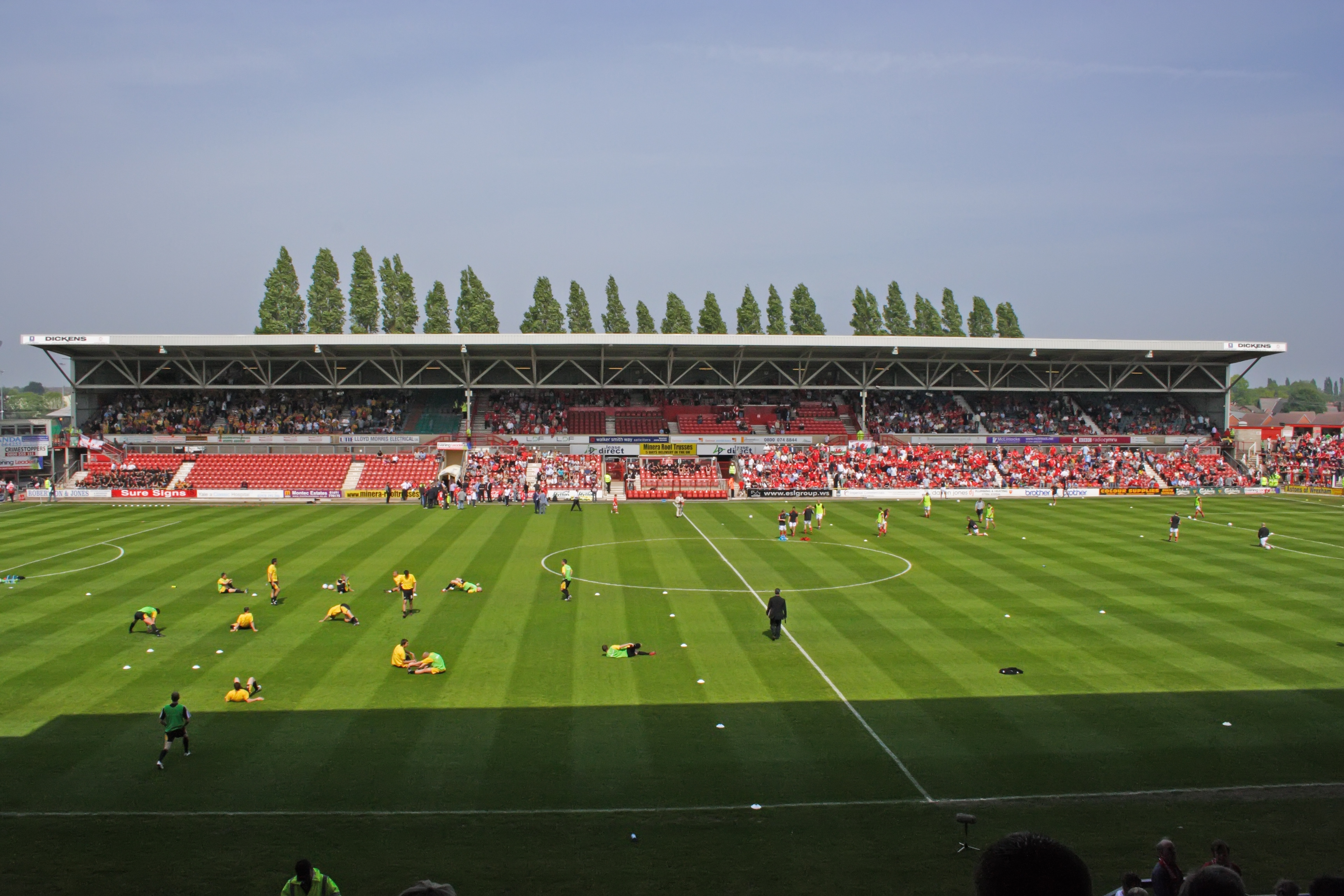
Wrexham Lager Stand

Wrexham Lager Stand
Capacity 4,200, backing onto where Yale College used to be. It was built in 1972 in preparation for the club's first venture into Europe, and also provided new dressing rooms, club offices and entertainment suites. The Centenary Club is also located here. The stand is sponsored by Wrexham Lager, a locally owned independent brewery. The club held a lottery during the 2009–10 season with the winner getting to name the stand for a season. The winning ticket resulted in the stand being called the Loyal Canadian Red Stand. For the 2010–11 season it had been renamed the Cash4Gold Stand.

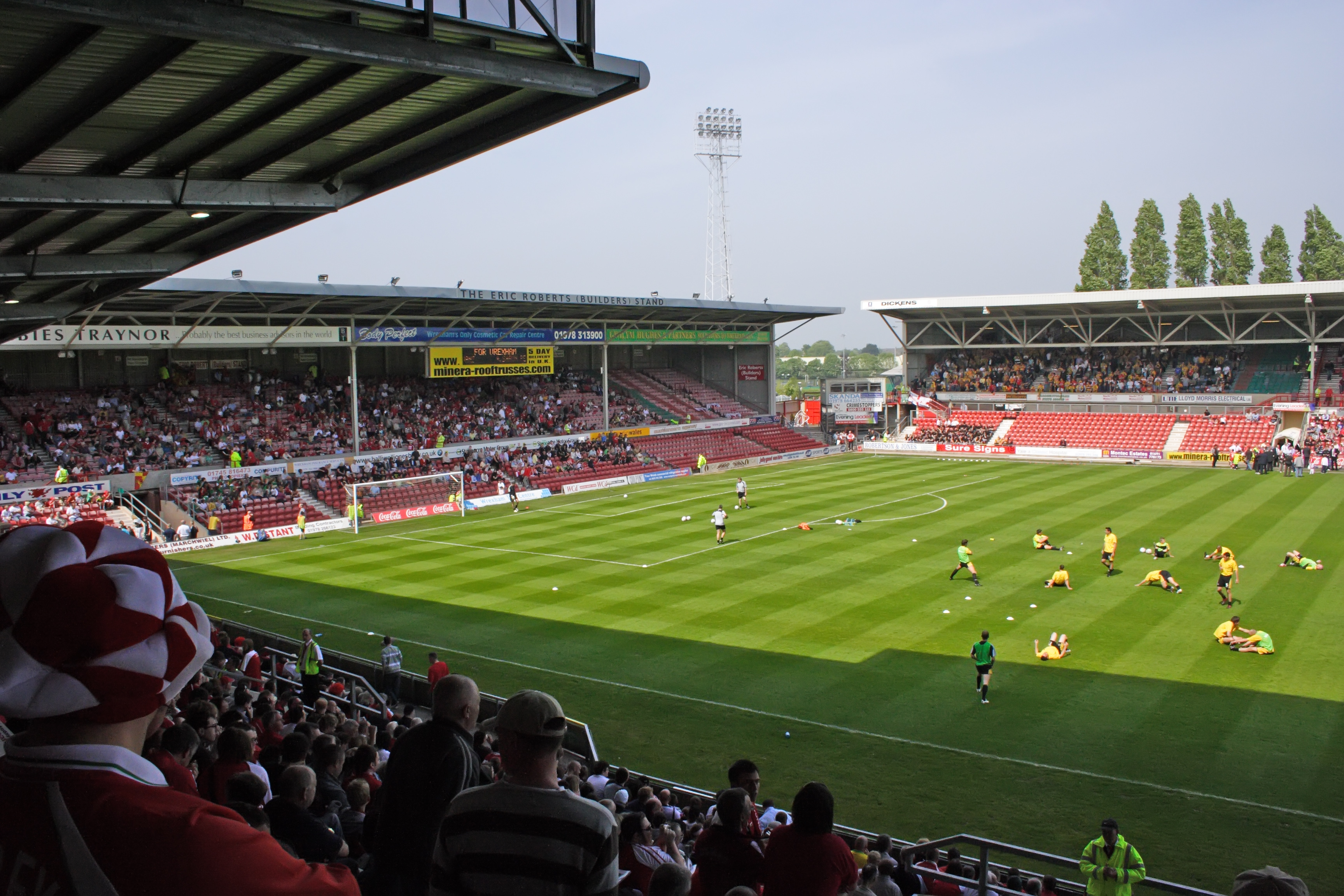
STōK Cold Brew Coffee Stand (a.k.a. "Tech End")

STōK Cold Brew Coffee Stand
Formerly the Wrexrent Stand, Marston's Stand, or Tech End. It holds 2,800 spectators and provides the supporters with excellent views of the pitch and excellent acoustics. From the 2007–08 season home fans will be located in this stand and away fans moved to the wing of the Yale Stand, with the exception of games where a large away attendance is anticipated. It was renamed for the 2023–24 season.

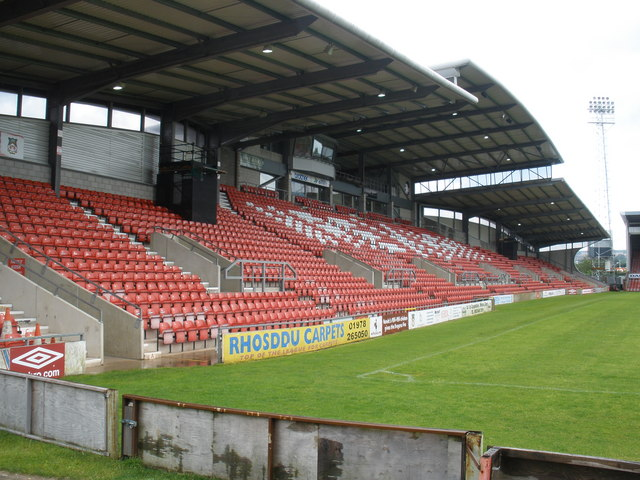
Macron Stand

Macron Stand
The newest stand, capacity 3,500, was secured with lottery funding, and built over the old Mold Road stand in 1999. The stand possesses a TV studio and eight fully equipped private boxes, and has a restaurant called "The Changing Rooms"; there is also a club shop which is run by the Supporters' Trust adjacent to the stand. The stand was initially named after the chairman Pryce Griffiths, but was renamed as the Mold Road Stand, following Pryce Griffith's endorsement of Alex Hamilton's redevelopment scheme. A family area, sponsored by Nando's was introduced in the 2009–10 season, located to the area of the stand nearest to the Kop. For the 2010–11 season, as part of the Crusaders presence, the stand was renamed the Greene King Stand

=== Disabled facilities ===
Wrexham have 38 disabled places available at the front of the Macron Stand. There are 22 parking spaces in the Wrexham University car park (next door) as well as two disabled toilets, plus low-counter refreshment kiosks, with steward assistance if required. Admission is £12 for disabled supporters (£5 concessions) and helpers are admitted free of charge.

The stadium has eight allocated spaces for those who are visually impaired; the commentary provided is also broadcast to the local hospital.

In October 2013, the stadium hosted the United Kingdom's first 'autism friendly' football match. A group of around 50 attended the Racecourse to watch Wrexham play against Woking.

In August 2015, a new viewing platform was opened by Lord Faulkner of Worcester, using funding from the Premier League's Football Stadia Improvement Fund. Located at the rear of the Macron Stand, this further increased the number of places available to disabled fans, as well as providing protection from the elements. It has space for six users and carers.

After the platform was opened, Baroness Tanni Grey-Thompson praised the club in the House of Lords, saying "This is a club, my Lords, that genuinely cares about its spectators. My Lords, the big clubs are hiding."

In January 2018, Wrexham Football Club hired Kerry Evans, its first disability liaison officer. At the beginning of the 2018–19 season it was announced that the Racecourse is now autism friendly, for every home game each season, with allocated seating in a quieter area of the stadium (if required) and the club also providing ear defenders and a quiet hub to use if required and a dedicated steward who is on hand to help. The club became the first in Wales to win an autism-friendly award in 2018, awarded by the National Autistic Society.

In November 2018, the DSA started the Audio Descriptive Commentary service, where blind or visually impaired supporters can listen to the game, live in the stadium. There are 10 handsets available, on a first come first served basis.

== Rugby League ==
=== Domestic ===
The ground was home to former Super League club Crusaders RL from 2010 after their departure from Brewery Field in Bridgend in South Wales. Crusaders were hoping to play at Rodney Parade in Newport but the deal fell through; they then decided to move to North Wales and a new franchise was created.

Crusaders have enjoyed some well-attended games at the Racecourse Ground during 2010 with their opening engage Super League match against Leeds attracted over 10,000 people, with large local support.

In 2011 Crusaders withdraw their Super League licence application and ultimately folded citing financial invalidity.

2012 saw the birth of a new club, born from the ashes of the old club. North Wales Crusaders currently play in the Co-operative Championship 1 competition. They are seen as a separate entity from the former club, and are starting their own chapter in rugby league history. From 2016, North Wales Crusaders no longer play at the Racecourse Ground.

=== International ===
International Rugby League games have also been staged at the ground. The stadium hosted Wales' clash with England in the 2012 Autumn International Series. In 2013, it held Wales' 2013 Rugby League World Cup home game with the USA on Sunday 3 November 2013, with the Tomahawks ending the home side's chance of a quarter-final appearance with a 24–16 win. The win by the US, a team expected to be beaten in their first ever Rugby League World Cup, would see them return to Wrexham for a quarter-final clash against tournament favourites Australia, on Saturday 16 November 2013. As expected, the Kangaroos (who would go on to win the World Cup) defeated the US 62–0, with 5,762 in attendance.

As part of the 2014 Rugby League European Cup, the Racecourse Ground hosted the match between Wales and Ireland on 2 November.

As of 2025, the Racecourse Ground has hosted ten Wales internationals. The results were as follows:

Date	Opponents	Result	Attendance	Part of
29 October 2000	Cook Islands	38–6	5,016	2000 World Cup
29 July 2001	England	33–42	6,373	Friendly
6 October 2010	Italy	6–13	2,971	Friendly
13 November 2011	Australia	14–56	5,233	2011 Four Nations
16 June 2012	France	16–28	1,464	Friendly
27 October 2012	England	12–80	4,014	2012 Autumn International Series
29 October 2013	United States	16–24	8,019	2013 Rugby League World Cup
2 November 2014	Ireland	14–46	1,293	2014 European Championship
16 October 2015	Scotland	18–12	1,253	2015 European Championship
11 November 2018	Ireland	40–0	1,257	2018 European Championship

== Rugby union ==
The Racecourse Ground has held four rugby union internationals. Three of them were Wales’ friendlies against Romania and won all three of them (70–21 30 August 1997, 40–3 on 3 October 1999 and 54–8 on 27 August 2003 which was a warm-up game before the 2003 Rugby World Cup). It also hosted a 1999 Rugby Union World Cup Pool 4 match between Japan and Samoa on 3 October 1999 with Samoa winning 43–9. The Racecourse has also played host to the Wales 'A' squad on numerous occasions.

Date	Competitors	Attendance	Part of
30 Aug. 1997	Wales 70-21 Romania		Autumn Internationals
3 Oct. 1999	Samoa 43-9 Japan	15,000	1999 Rugby World Cup Pool D
1 Nov. 2002	Wales 40-3 Romania	9,448	Autumn Internationals
27 Aug. 2003	Wales 54-8 Romania	4,000	2003 Rugby World Cup Warm-Up Tests

== Other uses ==
The first concert to be held at the Racecourse was in the summer of 1976 with the 'Festival of Entertainment.' Mac and Katie Kissoon, Junior Walker and KC and the Sunshine Band gave the occasion a distinctly soul/disco feel. The second concert to be held at the stadium took place in July 1982, when Motörhead headlined with Twisted Sister making their UK debut as the support act. Other concerts at the venue have included Stereophonics, as part of their Keep The Summer Alive tour, UB40 and Olly Murs. Kings of Leon performed two shows at the stadium in May 2023.

The stadium was used as a filming location in the 2014 television film Marvellous about the life of Neil Baldwin.

== Location ==
The ground is located on Mold Road close to the A483 dual carriageway. Wrexham General railway station is adjacent to the ground.

== Attendances ==
The five biggest attendances for Wrexham matches at the Racecourse have been:

Date	Competition	Opposition	Attendance
26 January 1957	FA Cup	Manchester United	34,445
26 December 1936	Third Division North	Chester City	29,261
17 January 1978	League Cup	Liverpool	25,641
11 March 1978	FA Cup	Arsenal	25,547
7 December 1935	Third Division North	Chester City	24,086

The largest all-seated attendance at the ground to date was 13,341 v Shrewsbury Town on 7 September 2024.
