= List of RC Strasbourg Alsace seasons =

Below is a list of RC Strasbourg Alsace's seasons since the club creation in 1906.

== Season per season detail ==
| Season | League | | | | | | | | | | Coupe de France | Coupe de la Ligue | European competition | Top goalscorer(s) | |
| Season | Division | Rank | Pts | Pld | W | D | L | GF | GA | GD | Coupe de France | Coupe de la Ligue | European competition | Player(s) | Goals |
|---|---|---|---|---|---|---|---|---|---|---|---|---|---|---|---|
Amateur era
| 1909–10 | SFV Div C | ? | ? | ? | ? | ? | ? | ? | ? | ? | | | | ? | ? |
| 1910–11 | SFV Div C | ? | ? | ? | ? | ? | ? | ? | ? | ? | | | | ? | ? |
| 1911–12 | SFV Div C | 2nd | ? | ? | ? | ? | ? | ? | ? | ? | | | | ? | ? |
| 1912–13 | SFV Div B | ? | ? | ? | ? | ? | ? | ? | ? | ? | | | | ? | ? |
| 1913–14 | SFV Div B | ? | ? | ? | ? | ? | ? | ? | ? | ? | | | | ? | ? |
| 1914–19 | No competition due to World War I | | | | | | | | | | | | | | |
| 1919–20 | Ch Alsace | 5th Gr Bas-Rhin | 24 | 14 | 4 | 2 | 8 | ? | ? | ? | – | | | ? | ? |
| 1920–21 | Ch Alsace | 5th | 7 | 10 | 3 | 1 | 6 | 15 | 15 | 0 | 1/32 f. | | | ? | ? |
| 1921–22 | Ch Alsace | 6th | 12 | 14 | 5 | 2 | 7 | ? | ? | ? | 1/32 f. | | | ? | ? |
| 1922–23 | Ch Alsace | Winners | 27 | 18 | 13 | 1 | 4 | 53 | 22 | +31 | – | | | ? | ? |
| 1923–24 | Ch Alsace | Winners | 29 | 18 | 14 | 1 | 3 | 62 | 21 | +41 | 1/16 f. | | | ? | ? |
| 1924–25 | Ch Alsace | 3rd Gr B | 12 | 10 | 4 | 4 | 2 | 21 | 16 | +5 | 1/16 f. | | | ? | ? |
| 1924–25 | Ch Alsace | 4th Final round | 9 | 10 | 3 | 3 | 4 | 24 | 20 | +4 | 1/16 f. | | | ? | ? |
| 1925–26 | Ch Alsace | 2nd Gr B | 14 | 10 | 5 | 4 | 1 | 24 | 16 | +8 | 1/16 f. | | | ? | ? |
| 1925–26 | Ch Alsace | 4th Final Round | 9 | 10 | 2 | 5 | 3 | 17 | 18 | −1 | 1/16 f. | | | ? | ? |
| 1926–27 | Ch Alsace | Winners | 28 | 18 | 11 | 6 | 1 | 39 | 15 | +24 | 1/32 f. | | | ? | ? |
| 1927–28 | Ch Alsace | 5th | 14 | 14 | 6 | 2 | 6 | 35 | 26 | +9 | Second round | | | ? | ? |
| 1928–29 | Ch Alsace | 4th | 13 | 14 | 6 | 1 | 7 | 36 | 35 | +1 | 1/32 f. | | | ? | ? |
| 1929–30 | Ch Alsace | 3rd | 14 | 13 | 5 | 4 | 4 | 26 | 15 | +11 | 1/32 f. | | | ? | ? |
| 1930–31 | Ch Alsace | 3rd | 18 | 14 | 8 | 2 | 4 | 33 | 26 | +7 | 1/8 f. | | | ? | ? |
| 1931–32 | Ch Alsace | 5th | 15 | 14 | 7 | 1 | 6 | 28 | 31 | −3 | 1/32 f. | | | ? | ? |
| 1932–33 | Ch Alsace | 3rd | 17 | 14 | 7 | 3 | 4 | 27 | 23 | +4 | 1/8 f. | | | ? | ? |
Professional era
| 1933–34 | D2 | 4th North pool | 30 | 24 | 13 | 4 | 7 | 64 | 42 | +22 | 1/16 f. | | | ? | ? |
| 1934–35 | D1 | 2nd | 47 | 30 | 21 | 5 | 4 | 73 | 33 | +40 | 1/16 f. | | | Oskar Rohr | 20 |
| 1935–36 | D1 | 3rd | 39 | 30 | 18 | 3 | 9 | 67 | 37 | +30 | 1/16 f. | | | Oskar Rohr | 28 |
| 1936–37 | D1 | 6th | 33 | 30 | 12 | 9 | 9 | 62 | 39 | +23 | Runners-up | | | Oskar Rohr | 30 |
| 1937–38 | D1 | 5th | 33 | 30 | 12 | 9 | 9 | 66 | 54 | +12 | 1/16 f. | | | Oskar Rohr | 25 |
| 1938–39 | D1 | 10th | 28 | 30 | 10 | 8 | 12 | 39 | 43 | −4 | Fifth round | | | Oskar Rohr | 14 |
| 1939–1940 | Ch Dordogne | Winners | ? | ? | ? | ? | ? | ? | ? | ? | 1/16 f. | | | ? | ? |
| 1940–1941 | Gauliga Elsaß | 1st Gr 1 | 24 | 14 | ? | ? | ? | 36 | 14 | +22 | | | | ? | ? |
| 1941–1942 | Gauliga Elsaß | 2nd | 38 | 22 | ? | ? | ? | 78 | 20 | +58 | | | | ? | ? |
| 1942–1943 | Gauliga Elsaß | 2nd | 31 | 18 | ? | ? | ? | 54 | 7 | +47 | | | | ? | ? |
| 1943–1944 | Gauliga Elsaß | 6th | 17 | 18 | ? | ? | ? | 25 | 36 | −11 | | | | ? | ? |
| 1944–1945 | No competition due to World War II | | | | | | | | | | | | | | |
| 1945–46 | D1 | 12th | 33 | 34 | 13 | 7 | 14 | 53 | 62 | −9 | 1/16 f. | | | ? | ? |
| 1946–47 | D1 | 3rd | 49 | 38 | 21 | 7 | 10 | 79 | 50 | +29 | Runners-up | | | ? | ? |
| 1947–48 | D1 | 6th | 37 | 34 | 13 | 11 | 10 | 82 | 58 | +24 | 1/32 f. | | | ? | ? |
| 1948–49 | D1 | 17th | 26 | 34 | 10 | 6 | 18 | 40 | 68 | −28 | 1/32 f. | | | ? | ? |
| 1949–50 | D1 | 13th | 31 | 34 | 11 | 9 | 14 | 46 | 73 | −27 | 1/16 f. | | | ? | ? |
| 1950–51 | D1 | 9th | 34 | 34 | 14 | 6 | 14 | 49 | 58 | −9 | Winners | | | ? | ? |
| 1951–52 | D1 | 18th | 16 | 34 | 4 | 8 | 22 | 38 | 80 | −42 | 1/8 f. | | | ? | ? |
| 1952–53 | D2 | 3rd | 53 | 34 | 23 | 7 | 4 | 87 | 32 | +55 | 1/32 f. | | | ? | ? |
| 1953–54 | D1 | 6th | 36 | 34 | 15 | 6 | 13 | 60 | 61 | −1 | 1/8 f. | | | ? | ? |
| 1954–55 | D1 | 4th | 37 | 34 | 15 | 7 | 12 | 74 | 55 | +19 | 1/2 f. | | | Ernst Stojaspal | 28 |
| 1955–56 | D1 | 14th | 30 | 34 | 12 | 6 | 16 | 54 | 66 | −12 | 1/16 f. | | | Ernst Stojaspal | 18 |
| 1956–57 | D1 | 17th | 26 | 34 | 9 | 8 | 17 | 43 | 66 | −23 | 1/16 f. | | | Ernst Stojaspal | 11 |
| 1957–58 | D2 | 4th | 54 | 42 | 22 | 10 | 10 | 89 | 53 | +37 | 1/4 f. | | | Antoine Groschulski | 19 |
| 1958–59 | D1 | 11th | 38 | 38 | 14 | 10 | 14 | 65 | 76 | −11 | 1/32 f. | | | Antoine Groschulski | 19 |
| 1959–60 | D1 | 19th | 25 | 38 | 9 | 7 | 22 | 55 | 92 | −37 | 1/16 f. | | – | Casimir Koza | 12 |
| 1960–61 | D2 | 4th | 45 | 36 | 19 | 7 | 10 | 70 | 38 | +32 | 1/8 f. | | – | Casimir Koza | 28 |
| 1961–62 | D1 | 15th | 34 | 38 | 12 | 10 | 16 | 45 | 54 | −9 | 1/32 f. | | ICFC: First round | Casimir Koza | 19 |
| 1962–63 | D1 | 14th | 34 | 38 | 9 | 16 | 13 | 54 | 63 | −9 | 1/16 f. | Winner | – | Casimir Koza | 14 |
| 1963–64 | D1 | 9th | 33 | 34 | 11 | 11 | 12 | 43 | 41 | +2 | 1/8 f. | | – | José Farías Casimir Koza | 10 |
| 1964–65 | D1 | 5th | 38 | 34 | 13 | 12 | 9 | 56 | 46 | +10 | 1/4 f. | – | ICFC: 1/4 f. | José Farías | 16 |
| 1965–66 | D1 | 8th | 38 | 38 | 13 | 12 | 13 | 59 | 47 | +12 | Winners | | ICFC: 1/32 f. | Gérard Hausser | 14 |
| 1966–67 | D1 | 12th | 36 | 38 | 14 | 8 | 16 | 54 | 52 | +2 | 1/8 f. | | CWC: Second round | José Farías | 12 |
| 1967–68 | D1 | 16th | 34 | 38 | 13 | 8 | 17 | 34 | 40 | −6 | 1/4 f. | | – | Philippe Piat | 9 |
| 1968–69 | D1 | 13th | 29 | 34 | 10 | 9 | 15 | 34 | 41 | −7 | 1/4 f. | | – | Philippe Piat | 10 |
| 1969–70 | D1 | 5th | 36 | 34 | 15 | 6 | 13 | 65 | 55 | +10 | 1/16 f. | | – | Wolfgang Kaniber Philippe Piat | 20 |
| 1970–71 | D1 | 18th | 31 | 38 | 13 | 5 | 20 | 54 | 63 | −9 | 1/16 f. | | – | Marc Molitor | 17 |
| 1971–72 | D2 | 1st Gr C | 52 | 30 | 24 | 4 | 2 | 92 | 19 | +73 | 1/32 f. | | – | Marc Molitor | 40 |
| 1972–73 | D1 | 16th | 30 | 38 | 9 | 12 | 17 | 42 | 62 | −20 | 1/32 f. | | – | Marc Molitor | 9 |
| 1973–74 | D1 | 8th | 45 | 38 | 13 | 11 | 14 | 62 | 67 | −5 | 1/8 f. | | – | Joseph Yegba Maya | 10 |
| 1974–75 | D1 | 9th | 43 | 38 | 16 | 8 | 14 | 49 | 56 | −7 | 1/4 f. | | – | Albert Gemmrich Giora Spiegel | 10 |
| 1975–76 | D1 | 19th | 32 | 38 | 9 | 11 | 18 | 39 | 56 | −17 | 1/32 f. | | – | Albert Gemmrich | 8 |
| 1976–77 | D2 | Winners | 49 | 34 | 23 | 3 | 8 | 84 | 26 | +58 | 1/8 f. | | – | Albert Gemmrich | 24 |
| 1977–78 | D1 | 3rd | 50 | 38 | 19 | 12 | 7 | 70 | 40 | +30 | 1/16 f. | | – | Albert Gemmrich | 21 |
| 1978–79 | D1 | Winners | 56 | 38 | 22 | 12 | 4 | 68 | 28 | +40 | 1/2 f. | | UC: 1/8 f. | Albert Gemmrich | 17 |
| 1979–80 | D1 | 5th | 43 | 38 | 17 | 9 | 12 | 58 | 50 | +8 | 1/16 f. | | EC: 1/4 f. | Carlos Bianchi | 8 |
| 1980–81 | D1 | 7th | 40 | 38 | 14 | 12 | 12 | 44 | 47 | −3 | 1/2 f. | | – | Vicky Peretz | 14 |
| 1981–82 | D1 | 10th | 36 | 38 | 12 | 12 | 14 | 41 | 41 | 0 | 1/32 f. | | – | Vicky Peretz | 13 |
| 1982–83 | D1 | 13th | 33 | 38 | 11 | 11 | 16 | 40 | 51 | −11 | 1/8 f. | | – | Olivier Rouyer | 6 |
| 1983–84 | D1 | 8th | 39 | 38 | 11 | 17 | 10 | 36 | 38 | −2 | 1/8 f. | | – | Albert Gemmrich | 8 |
| 1984–85 | D1 | 16th | 31 | 38 | 9 | 13 | 16 | 47 | 57 | −10 | 1/32 f. | | – | Walter Kelsch Éric Pécout | 12 |
| 1985–86 | D1 | 19th | 31 | 38 | 10 | 11 | 17 | 36 | 54 | −18 | 1/8 f. | | – | François Brisson | 10 |
| 1986–87 | D2 | 9th Gr A | 32 | 34 | 12 | 8 | 14 | 42 | 40 | +2 | 1/4 f. | | – | Peter Reichert | 13 |
| 1987–88 | D2 | Winners | 49 | 34 | 20 | 9 | 5 | 56 | 22 | +34 | 1/16 f. | | – | Peter Reichert | 15 |
| 1988–89 | D1 | 18th | 39 | 38 | 10 | 9 | 19 | 47 | 59 | −12 | 1/32 f. | | – | Peter Reichert | 12 |
| 1989–90 | D2 | 2nd Gr A | 43 | 34 | 16 | 11 | 7 | 70 | 39 | +31 | 1/16 f. | | – | Didier Monczuk | 26 |
| 1990–91 | D2 | 2nd Gr A | 43 | 34 | 19 | 5 | 10 | 70 | 37 | +33 | 1/32 f. | | – | Didier Monczuk | 23 |
| 1991–92 | D2 | 2nd Gr B | 49 | 34 | 20 | 9 | 5 | 75 | 26 | +49 | 1/32 f. | | – | Didier Monczuk | 21 |
| 1992–93 | D1 | 8th | 40 | 38 | 12 | 16 | 10 | 58 | 57 | +1 | 1/32 f. | | – | Frank Lebœuf | 12 |
| 1993–94 | D1 | 13th | 34 | 38 | 10 | 14 | 14 | 43 | 47 | −4 | 1/32 f. | | – | Michael Hughes Frank Lebœuf | 7 |
| 1994–95 | D1 | 10th | 51 | 38 | 13 | 12 | 13 | 43 | 43 | 0 | Runners-up | 1/16 f. | – | Xavier Gravelaine | 9 |
| 1995–96 | D1 | 9th | 54 | 38 | 14 | 12 | 12 | 46 | 44 | +2 | 1/4 f. | 1/16 f. | UIC: Winner | Aleksandr Mostovoi | 9 |
| 1995–96 | D1 | 9th | 54 | 38 | 14 | 12 | 12 | 46 | 44 | +2 | 1/4 f. | 1/16 f. | UC: 1/16 f. | Aleksandr Mostovoi | 9 |
| 1996–97 | D1 | 9th | 60 | 38 | 19 | 3 | 16 | 52 | 49 | +3 | 1/8 f. | Winners | UIC: Group stage | David Zitelli | 19 |
| 1997–98 | D1 | 13th | 37 | 34 | 9 | 10 | 15 | 39 | 43 | −4 | 1/32 f. | 1/16 f. | UC: 1/8 f. | Gérald Baticle Pascal Nouma | 8 |
| 1998–99 | D1 | 12th | 38 | 34 | 8 | 14 | 12 | 30 | 36 | −6 | 1/16 f. | 1/16 f. | – | Teddy Bertin | 8 |
| 1999–2000 | D1 | 9th | 46 | 34 | 13 | 7 | 14 | 42 | 52 | −10 | 1/4 f. | 1/4 f. | – | Olivier Echouafni | 9 |
| 2000–01 | D1 | 18th | 29 | 34 | 7 | 8 | 19 | 28 | 61 | −33 | Winners | 1/16 f. | – | Péguy Luyindula | 7 |
| 2001–02 | D2 | 2nd | 45 | 38 | 19 | 11 | 8 | 47 | 27 | +20 | 1/4 f. | 1/4 f. | UC: First round | Danijel Ljuboja | 15 |
| 2002–03 | L1 | 13th | 45 | 38 | 11 | 12 | 15 | 40 | 54 | −14 | 1/32 f. | 1/16 f. | – | Danijel Ljuboja | 9 |
| 2003–04 | L1 | 13th | 43 | 38 | 10 | 13 | 15 | 43 | 50 | −7 | 1/32 f. | 1/16 f. | – | Ulrich Le Pen Mamadou Niang | 9 |
| 2004–05 | L1 | 11th | 48 | 38 | 12 | 12 | 14 | 42 | 43 | −1 | 1/32 f. | Winners | – | Mickaël Pagis | 15 |
| 2005–06 | L1 | 19th | 29 | 38 | 5 | 14 | 19 | 33 | 56 | −23 | 1/16 f. | 1/16 f. | UC: 1/8 f. | Amara Diané | 9 |
| 2006–07 | L2 | 3rd | 70 | 38 | 19 | 13 | 6 | 47 | 33 | +14 | 1/16 f. | 1/16 f. | – | Eric Mouloungui | 11 |
| 2007–08 | L1 | 19th | 35 | 38 | 9 | 8 | 21 | 34 | 55 | −21 | 1/16 f. | 1/16 f. | – | Wason Rentería | 9 |
| 2008–09 | L2 | 4th | 65 | 38 | 18 | 11 | 9 | 57 | 45 | +12 | 1/64 f. | 1/32 f. | – | Fanchone | 13 |
| 2009–10 | L2 | 19th | 42 | 38 | 9 | 15 | 14 | 42 | 49 | -7 | 1/64 f. | 1/64 f. | – | Nicolas Fauvergue | 13 |
| 2010–11 | CN | 4th | 77 | 40 | 20 | 17 | 3 | 56 | 27 | +29 | 1/16 f. | 1/64 f. | – | Ali Mathlouthi | 13 |
| 2011–12 | CdFA2 | Winners | 100 | 30 | 21 | 7 | 2 | 66 | 14 | +52 | 1/64 f. | – | – | ? | ? |
| 2012–13 | CdFA | Winners | 96 | 34 | 17 | 11 | 6 | 47 | 29 | +18 | 1/64 f. | – | – | ? | ? |
| 2013–14 | CN | 16th | 35 | 34 | 8 | 11 | 15 | 36 | 40 | −4 | Eighth round | – | – | Dimitri Liénard | 8 |
| 2014–15 | CN | 4th | 65 | 34 | 19 | 8 | 7 | 50 | 29 | +21 | 1/64 f. | – | – | Jérémy Blayac | 12 |
| 2015–16 | CN | Winners | 58 | 34 | 15 | 13 | 6 | 35 | 19 | +16 | 1/128 f. | – | – | Jérémy Blayac | 8 |
| 2016–17 | L2 | Winners | 67 | 38 | 19 | 10 | 9 | 63 | 47 | +16 | 1/16 f. | 1/32 f. | – | Khalid Boutaïb | 20 |
| 2017–18 | L1 | 15th | 38 | 38 | 9 | 11 | 18 | 44 | 67 | −23 | 1/4 f. | 1/8 f. | – | Stéphane Bahoken | 7 |
| 2018–19 | L1 | 11th | 49 | 38 | 11 | 16 | 11 | 58 | 48 | +10 | 1/16 f. | Winners | – | Lebo Mothiba | 10 |
| 2019–20 | L1 | 10th | 38 | 27 | 11 | 5 | 11 | 32 | 32 | 0 | 1/8 f. | 1/4 f. | UEL: Play-off round | Ludovic Ajorque Adrien Thomasson | 8 |
| 2020–21 | L1 | 15th | 42 | 38 | 11 | 9 | 18 | 49 | 58 | −9 | 1/32 f. | – | – | Ludovic Ajorque | 16 |
| 2021–22 | L1 | 6th | 63 | 38 | 17 | 12 | 9 | 60 | 43 | +17 | 1/16 f. | – | – | Ludovic Ajorque | 12 |
| 2022–23 | L1 | 15th | 40 | 38 | 9 | 13 | 16 | 51 | 59 | −8 | 1/32 f. | – | – | Habib Diallo | 20 |
| 2023–24 | L1 | 13th | 39 | 34 | 10 | 9 | 15 | 38 | 50 | −12 | 1/4 f. | – | – | Emanuel Emegha | 8 |
| 2024–25 | L1 | 7th | 57 | 34 | 16 | 9 | 9 | 56 | 44 | +12 | 1/8 f. | – | – | Emanuel Emegha | 14 |
| 2025–26 | L1 | 8th | 53 | 34 | 15 | 8 | 11 | 58 | 47 | +11 | 1/2 f. | – | UECL: 1/2 f. | Joaquín Panichelli | 16 |
| Season | League | | | | | | | | | | Coupe de France | Coupe de la Ligue | European competition | Top goalscorer(s) | |
| Season | Division | Rank | Pts | Pld | W | D | L | GF | GA | GD | Coupe de France | Coupe de la Ligue | European competition | Player(s) | Goals |

== Key ==
- Pts = Points
- Pld = Matches played
- W = Matches won
- D = Matches drawn
- L = Matches lost
- GF = Goals for
- GA = Goals against
- GD = Goal difference
- L1/D1 = Ligue 1
- L2/D2 = Ligue 2
- CN = Championnat National
- CdFA = Championnat de France Amateur
- Ch Alsace = Alsace regional championship
- Ch Dordogne = Dordogne championship
- SFV Div B/C = Süddeutscher Fussball Verband Division B/C
- UCL = UEFA Champions League
- EC = European Cup
- CWC = UEFA Cup Winners' Cup
- UEL = UEFA Europa League
- UC = UEFA Cup
- UECL = UEFA Conference League
- UIC = UEFA Intertoto Cup
- ICFC = Inter-Cities Fairs Cup

| Winners | Runners-up | Promoted | Relegated | Inferior level championship |

== Total ==
As of 20 July 2008.

| League | Seasons | Titles | P | W | D | L | Gf | Ga | Dif |
|---|---|---|---|---|---|---|---|---|---|
| L1 | 56 | 1 | 2016 | 690 | 544 | 782 | 2795 | 2969 | −174 |
| L2 | 9 | 2 | 310 | 172 | 73 | 65 | 583 | 269 | +314 |
| European cups | Seasons | Titles | P | W | D | L | Gf | Ga | Dif |
| C1 | 1 | 0 | 6 | 3 | 1 | 2 | 8 | 6 | +2 |
| C2 | 1 | 0 | 4 | 2 | 1 | 1 | 3 | 3 | 0 |
| C3 | 8 | 0 | 44 | 18 | 12 | 14 | 64 | 57 | +20 |
| C4 | 2 | 1 | 10 | 6 | 4 | 0 | 22 | 3 | +19 |
