= Eric Johnson =

Eric Johnson may refer to:

== Arts ==
- Eric Johnson (guitarist) (born 1954), American guitarist and recording artist
- Eric D. Johnson (born 1976), American musician, member of indie-rock bands including Fruit Bats, The Shins and Califone
- Eric Johnson (sculptor) (born 1949) sculptor in San Pedro, California
- Eric Vale (born 1974), American voice actor sometimes credited as Eric Johnson
- Eric Johnson (actor) (born 1979), Canadian actor

== Politics ==
- Eric Johnson (Georgia politician) (born 1953), state senator
- Eric Johnson (New Hampshire politician), state representative
- Eric Johnson (Texas politician) (born 1975), mayor of Dallas
- Eric Johnson (British politician) (1897–1978), British Conservative Party politician

== Sports ==
=== American football ===
- Eric Johnson (defensive back, born 1976), American football linebacker
- Eric Johnson (defensive back, born 1952), American football defensive back
- Eric Johnson (tight end) (born 1979), American football tight end
- Eric Johnson (defensive tackle) (born 1998), American football defensive tackle

=== Other sportspeople ===
- Eric Johnson (golfer) (born 1962), American golfer
- Eric Johnson (basketball) (born 1966), American former basketball player
- Eric Johnson (Australian sportsman) (1902–1976), Australian rules footballer and cricketer
- Eric Johnson (footballer) (born 1944), English footballer
- Eric Johnson Jr. (born 2003), American stock car racing driver

== Other ==
- Eric Johnson (journalist), American news and sports reporter in Seattle
- Eric A. Johnson (historian) (born 1948), American historian and professor of history
- Eric A. Johnson (microbiologist), American microbiologist and professor of bacteriology
- Eric J. Johnson, professor of marketing at Columbia University
- Eric Johnson (theologian), professor at Southern Baptist Theological Seminary
- M. Eric Johnson, dean of the Owen Graduate School of Management, Vanderbilt University

== See also ==
- Erik Johnson (born 1988), American ice hockey defenseman
- Erik Johnson (disambiguation)
- Eric Johnston (disambiguation)
