= Eric A. Johnson =

Eric A. Johnson may refer to:

- Eric A. Johnson (historian) (born 1948), American historian and professor of history
- Eric A. Johnson (microbiologist), American microbiologist and professor of bacteriology
- Eric Johnson (Australian sportsman) (Eric Alfred Johnson, 1902–1976), Australian rules footballer and cricketer

== See also ==
- Eric Johnson (disambiguation)
