= 1927 in association football =

The following are the football (soccer) events of the year 1927 throughout the world.

== Events ==
- Cardiff City FC become the first football team from outside England to win the FA Cup beating Arsenal FC 1-0 in the final. The goal was scored by Hughie Ferguson who was played by Gary Dobbs in the 2007 Welsh TV recreation of the famous match.
- May 24 – Chilean club Universidad de Chile established
- November 1 – Peru plays its first ever international match. In Lima the hosts are beaten by Uruguay: 0-4.

=== Club formed in 1927 ===
- A.S. Roma
- FC Dynamo Kyiv

== Winners club national championship ==
- Denmark: B93
- England: Newcastle United
- Greece: Regional Championships:

EPSA (Athens) Panathinaikos
EPSP (Pireas) Olympiacos
EPSM (Thessaloniki) Iraklis
EPSP (Patras) A.P.S. Olympiakos Patras

- Iceland: KR
- Italy: no championships
- Kingdom of Serbs, Croats and Slovenes: Hajduk Split
- Paraguay: Olimpia Asunción
- Poland: Wisła Kraków
- Scotland:
  - Division One: Rangers F.C.
  - Scottish Cup: Celtic F.C.
- Turkey: Muhafızgücü

== International tournaments ==
- 1927 British Home Championship (October 20, 1926 – April 9, 1927)

Shared by England & Scotland

- 1924-28 Nordic Football Championship (June 15, 1924 – October 7, 1928) 1927: (June 19 – October 30, 1927)

Denmark (1927)
Denmark (1924-1928)

- South American Championship 1927 in Peru (October 30, 1927 – November 27, 1927)

Argentina

== Births ==
- January 18 – Werner Liebrich, German international footballer (died 1995)
- January 23 – Frank Bee, English professional footballer (died 2010)
- January 26 – Victor Mees, Belgian international footballer (died 2012)
- January 28 – Karl Bögelein, German international footballer and coach (died 2016)
- March 1 –George Davies, English footballer
- March 2 – Erol Keskin, Turkish international footballer (died 2016)
- March 27 – Karl Stotz, Austrian international footballer and manager (died 2017)
- April 1
  - Walter Bahr, American soccer player (died 2018)
  - Ferenc Puskás, Hungarian international forward (died 2016)
- April 6 – Harry Beitzel, Australian football umpire, broadcaster (died 2017)
- April 30 – Johann Zeitler, German footballer (died 2018)
- May 2 – Víctor Rodríguez Andrade, Uruguayan international footballer (died 1985)
- May 3 – Günter Schröter, East German international footballer (died 2016)
- May 9
  - Stewart McCallum, Scottish footballer (died 2008)
  - Juan José Pizzuti, Argentine footballer and manager (died 2020)
- June 16 – Ya'akov Hodorov, Israeli international football goalkeeper (died 2006)
- July 22
  - Bernard Bonner, Scottish professional footballer (died 2005)
  - Dagoberto Moll, Uruguayan footballer and manager
- August 20 – Derek Jackman, English footballer (died 2017)
- October 14 – Emil Pažický, Slovak international footballer (died 2003)
- October 19 – Hans Schäfer, German international footballer (died 2017)
- December 5 – Omar Oscar Míguez, Uruguayan footballer (died 2006)
