= Harry Hart =

Harry Hart may refer to:

== People ==
- Harry Hart (athlete) (1905–1979), South African discus thrower and shot putter
- Harry Hart (basketball), player for Omonia B.C.
- Harry Hart (footballer) (1926–2012), English footballer
- Harry Hart (mathematician), inventor ~1874 of Hart's inversor

== Characters ==
- Harry Hart, character in Something for the Boys
- Harry Hart, character in Kingsman: The Secret Service

== See also ==
- Henry Hart (disambiguation)
- Harold Hart (born 1952), American football player
- Harold Hart (cricketer) (1889–1953), Australian cricketer
- Harry Hart Frank (1908–1964), known by the pen name Pat Frank, American writer, newspaperman, and government consultant
