= 1927–28 Football League =

36th season of the Football League

The Football League
- Season: 1927–28
- Champions: Everton
- Relegated: Durham City
- New Team in League: Torquay United

The 1927–28 season was the 36th season of The Football League.

== Final league tables ==
The tables and results below are reproduced here in the exact form that they can be found at The Rec.Sport.Soccer Statistics Foundation website and in Rothmans Book of Football League Records 1888–89 to 1978–79, with home and away statistics separated.

Beginning with the season 1894–95, clubs finishing level on points were separated according to goal average (goals scored divided by goals conceded), or more properly put, goal ratio. In case one or more teams had the same goal difference, this system favoured those teams who had scored fewer goals. The goal average system was eventually scrapped beginning with the 1976–77 season. From the 1922–23 season on Re-election was required of the bottom two teams of both Third Division North and Third Division South.

== First Division ==
First Division
- Season: 1927–28
- Champions: Everton; 3rd English title
- Relegated: Tottenham Hotspur; Middlesbrough
- Matches: 462
- Goals: 1,765 (3.82 per match)
- Top goalscorer: Dixie Dean (60 goals)
- Biggest home win: Everton 7–0 West Ham United (22 October 1927)
- Biggest away win: Manchester United 1–7 Newcastle United (10 September 1927); Sheffield United 1–7 Huddersfield Town (12 November 1927)
- Highest scoring: Newcastle United 7–5 Aston Villa (10 March 1928)

Pos	Team	Pld	W	D	L	GF	GA	GAv	Pts	Relegation
1	Everton (C)	42	20	13	9	102	66	1.545	53	
2	Huddersfield Town	42	22	7	13	91	68	1.338	51	
3	Leicester City	42	18	12	12	96	72	1.333	48	
4	Derby County	42	17	10	15	96	83	1.157	44	
5	Bury	42	20	4	18	80	80	1.000	44	
6	Cardiff City	42	17	10	15	70	80	0.875	44	
7	Bolton Wanderers	42	16	11	15	81	66	1.227	43	
8	Aston Villa	42	17	9	16	78	73	1.068	43	
9	Newcastle United	42	15	13	14	79	81	0.975	43	
10	Arsenal	42	13	15	14	82	86	0.953	41	
11	Birmingham	42	13	15	14	70	75	0.933	41	
12	Blackburn Rovers	42	16	9	17	66	78	0.846	41	
13	Sheffield United	42	15	10	17	79	86	0.919	40	
14	The Wednesday	42	13	13	16	81	78	1.038	39	
15	Sunderland	42	15	9	18	74	76	0.974	39	
16	Liverpool	42	13	13	16	84	87	0.966	39	
17	West Ham United	42	14	11	17	81	88	0.920	39	
18	Manchester United	42	16	7	19	72	80	0.900	39	
19	Burnley	42	16	7	19	82	98	0.837	39	
20	Portsmouth	42	16	7	19	66	90	0.733	39	
21	Tottenham Hotspur (R)	42	15	8	19	74	86	0.860	38	Relegation to the Second Division
22	Middlesbrough (R)	42	11	15	16	81	88	0.920	37	Relegation to the Second Division

Source: World Football
Rules for classification: 1) Points; 2) Goal average; 3) Goals scored
(C) Champions; (R) Relegated

=== Results ===
Home \ Away	ARS	AST	BIR	BLB	BOL	BUR	BRY	CAR	DER	EVE	HUD	LEI	LIV	MUN	MID	NEW	POR	SHU	SUN	TOT	WED	WHU
Arsenal		0–3	2–2	3–2	1–2	4–1	3–1	3–0	3–4	3–2	0–0	2–2	6–3	0–1	3–1	4–1	0–2	6–1	2–1	1–1	1–1	2–2
Aston Villa	2–2		1–1	2–0	2–2	3–1	1–0	3–1	0–1	2–3	3–0	0–3	3–4	3–1	5–1	3–0	7–2	1–0	4–2	1–2	5–4	1–0
Birmingham	1–1	1–1		2–1	1–1	4–0	2–2	1–3	2–1	2–2	3–1	0–2	2–0	0–0	3–2	0–2	2–0	4–1	1–1	3–2	1–0	1–2
Blackburn Rovers	4–1	0–1	4–4		1–6	2–1	0–1	0–0	3–2	4–2	1–1	0–0	2–1	3–0	3–0	1–0	6–0	1–0	0–0	2–1	3–1	1–0
Bolton Wanderers	1–1	3–1	3–2	3–1		7–1	2–1	2–1	1–3	1–1	0–1	3–3	2–1	3–2	0–0	1–2	3–1	1–1	1–2	4–1	2–0	4–0
Burnley	1–2	4–2	2–1	3–1	2–2		2–3	2–1	4–2	3–5	0–1	5–1	2–2	4–0	1–1	5–1	2–0	5–3	3–0	2–2	3–1	0–0
Bury	5–1	0–0	2–3	2–3	1–0	2–0		3–0	3–0	2–3	2–3	2–1	5–2	4–3	1–4	1–4	4–0	1–0	5–3	1–2	4–2	3–1
Cardiff City	2–2	2–1	2–1	1–1	2–1	3–2	0–1		4–4	2–0	4–0	3–0	1–1	2–0	1–1	3–1	3–1	2–2	3–1	2–1	1–1	1–5
Derby County	4–0	5–0	4–1	6–0	1–0	3–4	5–2	7–1		0–3	0–0	2–1	2–3	5–0	2–1	1–1	2–2	2–1	1–0	1–1	4–6	2–3
Everton	3–3	3–2	5–2	4–1	2–2	4–1	1–1	2–1	2–2		2–2	7–1	1–1	5–2	3–1	3–0	0–0	0–0	0–1	2–5	4–0	7–0
Huddersfield Town	2–1	1–1	2–0	3–1	1–0	1–2	3–0	8–2	2–1	4–1		3–1	2–4	4–2	2–4	1–3	4–1	0–1	4–2	4–2	1–0	5–2
Leicester City	3–2	3–0	3–0	6–0	4–2	5–0	2–2	4–1	4–0	1–0	1–2		1–1	1–0	3–3	3–0	6–2	3–1	3–3	6–1	2–2	2–3
Liverpool	0–2	0–0	2–3	4–2	4–2	2–2	5–1	1–2	5–2	3–3	4–2	1–1		2–0	1–1	0–0	8–2	2–1	2–5	2–0	5–2	1–3
Manchester United	4–1	5–1	1–1	1–1	2–1	4–3	0–1	2–2	5–0	1–0	0–0	5–2	6–1		3–0	1–7	2–0	2–3	2–1	3–0	1–1	1–1
Middlesbrough	2–2	0–0	1–1	2–0	2–5	2–3	6–1	1–2	3–3	4–2	3–1	1–1	1–1	1–2		1–1	5–1	3–0	0–3	3–1	3–3	2–2
Newcastle United	1–1	7–5	1–1	0–1	2–2	1–1	2–3	2–0	4–3	2–2	2–3	1–5	1–1	4–1	3–3		1–3	1–0	3–1	4–1	4–3	3–1
Portsmouth	2–3	3–1	2–2	2–2	1–0	1–0	1–0	3–0	2–2	1–3	2–1	2–0	1–0	1–0	4–1	0–1		4–1	3–5	3–0	0–0	2–1
Sheffield United	6–4	0–3	3–1	2–3	4–3	5–2	3–1	3–4	1–0	1–3	1–7	1–1	1–1	2–1	4–1	1–1	3–1		5–1	3–1	1–1	6–2
Sunderland	5–1	2–3	4–2	1–0	1–1	2–3	1–0	0–2	0–1	0–2	3–0	2–2	2–1	4–1	1–0	1–1	3–3	0–1		0–0	2–3	3–2
Tottenham Hotspur	2–0	2–1	1–0	1–1	1–2	5–0	1–4	1–0	1–2	1–3	2–2	2–1	3–1	4–1	4–2	5–2	0–3	2–2	3–1		1–3	5–3
The Wednesday	1–1	2–0	2–3	4–1	3–0	5–0	4–0	3–3	2–2	1–2	0–5	1–2	4–0	0–2	2–3	0–0	2–0	3–3	0–0	4–2		2–0
West Ham United	2–2	0–0	3–3	4–3	2–0	2–0	1–2	2–0	2–2	0–0	4–2	4–0	3–1	1–2	4–5	5–2	4–2	1–1	2–4	1–1	1–2	

Updated to match(es) played on unknown. Source:
Legend: Blue = home team win; Yellow = draw; Red = away team win.

=== Maps ===
Locations of the Football League First Division London teams
Locations of the Football League First Division teams

== Second Division ==
Football League Second Division
- Season: 1927–28
- Champions: Manchester City (4th title)
- Relegated: Fulham; South Shields
- Matches: 462
- Goals: 1,607 (3.48 per match)
- Top goalscorer: Jimmy Cookson (West Bromwich Albion), 38
- Biggest home win: Notts County – Barnsley 9–0 (19 Nov 1927)
- Biggest away win: Grimsby Town – West Bromwich Albion 0–6 (7 Jan 1928)
- Highest scoring: Barnsley–Fulham 8–4 (28 Jan 1928)

Pos	Team	Pld	W	D	L	GF	GA	GAv	Pts	Promotion or relegation
1	Manchester City (C, P)	42	25	9	8	100	59	1.695	59	Promotion to the First Division
2	Leeds United (P)	42	25	7	10	98	49	2.000	57	Promotion to the First Division
3	Chelsea	42	23	8	11	75	45	1.667	54	
4	Preston North End	42	22	9	11	100	66	1.515	53	
5	Stoke City	42	22	8	12	78	59	1.322	52	
6	Swansea Town	42	18	12	12	75	63	1.190	48	
7	Oldham Athletic	42	19	8	15	75	51	1.471	46	
8	West Bromwich Albion	42	17	12	13	90	70	1.286	46	
9	Port Vale	42	18	8	16	68	57	1.193	44	
10	Nottingham Forest	42	15	10	17	83	84	0.988	40	
11	Grimsby Town	42	14	12	16	69	83	0.831	40	
12	Bristol City	42	15	9	18	76	79	0.962	39	
13	Barnsley	42	14	11	17	65	85	0.765	39	
14	Hull City	42	12	15	15	41	54	0.759	39	
15	Notts County	42	13	12	17	68	74	0.919	38	
16	Wolverhampton Wanderers	42	13	10	19	63	91	0.692	36	
17	Southampton	42	14	7	21	68	77	0.883	35	
18	Reading	42	11	13	18	53	75	0.707	35	
19	Blackpool	42	13	8	21	83	101	0.822	34	
20	Clapton Orient	42	11	12	19	55	85	0.647	34	
21	Fulham (R)	42	13	7	22	68	89	0.764	33	Relegation to the Third Division South
22	South Shields (R)	42	7	9	26	56	111	0.505	23	Relegation to the Third Division North

(C) Champions; (P) Promoted; (R) Relegated

=== Results ===
Home \ Away	BAR	BLP	BRI	CHE	CLA	FUL	GRI	HUL	LEE	MCI	NOT	NTC	OLD	PTV	PNE	REA	SOU	SSH	STK	SWA	WBA	WOL
Barnsley		2–1	2–3	3–1	4–2	8–4	1–4	1–1	2–1	0–3	2–1	0–0	0–1	4–2	2–1	2–0	0–1	0–0	3–1	3–3	2–4	2–2
Blackpool	1–3		6–2	2–4	0–1	4–0	4–5	2–1	0–2	2–2	5–3	3–3	1–2	1–6	4–1	3–1	1–0	4–1	3–1	2–2	4–3	3–0
Bristol City	2–0	2–2		1–1	5–1	3–0	0–0	0–1	1–2	2–0	0–0	1–2	2–1	4–0	1–3	4–1	3–0	1–1	4–0	2–1	0–1	4–1
Chelsea	1–2	3–0	5–2		1–0	2–1	4–0	2–0	2–3	0–1	2–1	5–0	2–1	1–0	2–1	0–0	0–2	6–0	1–0	4–0	1–1	2–0
Clapton Orient	2–0	2–5	4–2	2–1		3–2	1–2	0–0	2–1	0–2	2–2	0–1	2–0	0–1	1–1	3–0	2–0	2–2	3–2	1–1	0–0	0–0
Fulham	3–1	2–2	5–0	1–1	2–0		2–2	0–2	1–1	1–1	2–0	2–1	1–1	4–0	2–2	1–0	1–0	2–0	1–5	3–2	3–1	7–0
Grimsby Town	3–1	3–3	1–4	1–1	2–2	1–0		1–1	3–2	4–1	2–1	1–0	1–2	3–0	4–6	3–3	2–2	4–1	1–2	1–2	0–6	0–1
Hull City	2–1	2–2	1–1	0–2	2–2	3–2	0–1		3–1	0–0	2–0	1–1	2–2	1–0	0–0	0–1	1–0	1–0	1–0	0–2	1–1	2–0
Leeds United	2–2	4–0	3–2	5–0	4–0	2–1	0–0	2–0		0–1	4–0	6–0	1–0	3–0	2–4	6–2	2–0	3–0	5–1	5–0	1–2	3–0
Manchester City	7–3	4–1	4–2	0–1	5–3	2–1	2–0	2–1	2–1		3–3	3–1	3–1	1–0	2–2	4–1	6–1	3–0	4–0	7–4	3–1	3–0
Nottingham Forest	1–1	4–1	1–1	2–2	4–3	7–0	5–2	1–1	2–2	4–5		2–1	2–1	0–2	3–1	5–3	1–1	7–2	0–2	0–2	0–2	3–2
Notts County	9–0	3–1	1–2	0–1	3–0	0–1	3–2	1–1	2–2	2–1	1–2		2–1	2–4	6–2	1–1	0–0	4–1	1–2	2–0	3–0	1–2
Oldham Athletic	0–1	6–0	4–1	2–1	5–0	4–2	1–0	5–0	0–1	3–2	4–1	0–0		4–1	0–0	3–2	3–1	2–2	3–1	0–1	3–1	3–0
Port Vale	2–1	3–0	5–1	1–1	0–0	4–1	2–2	1–2	1–2	1–2	2–2	3–0	1–0		2–0	3–0	4–0	2–3	0–0	2–0	4–1	2–2
Preston North End	1–2	2–1	5–1	0–3	0–0	1–0	3–0	4–2	5–1	1–0	5–0	4–0	1–1	4–0		4–0	1–2	7–2	2–0	4–2	3–3	5–4
Reading	1–1	1–0	3–2	1–2	4–0	2–1	2–2	3–0	0–1	1–1	0–2	2–2	1–0	0–0	2–1		0–0	5–1	1–1	0–0	1–4	2–1
Southampton	6–1	2–0	3–2	2–4	1–3	5–2	5–0	2–0	1–4	1–1	2–1	5–1	5–2	1–3	0–0	0–0		3–5	3–6	0–2	3–2	4–1
South Shields	0–0	2–2	1–3	2–1	2–2	2–1	1–2	1–0	1–5	0–1	3–4	2–3	0–3	0–1	2–3	0–0	2–1		2–3	3–1	2–3	2–2
Stoke City	0–0	2–0	1–0	1–0	2–0	5–1	0–0	3–1	5–1	2–0	1–3	3–0	3–0	0–2	3–2	4–1	2–1	3–1		1–1	1–1	2–2
Swansea Town	3–0	1–0	1–1	0–0	5–0	2–1	3–2	2–0	1–1	5–3	2–0	1–1	0–0	2–0	0–1	0–1	2–0	6–3	1–1		3–2	6–0
West Bromwich Albion	1–1	6–3	0–0	3–0	4–1	4–0	3–1	1–1	0–1	1–1	2–3	2–2	0–0	0–0	2–4	5–3	2–1	3–0	2–4	5–2		4–0
Wolverhampton Wanderers	2–1	2–4	5–2	1–2	5–3	3–1	0–1	1–1	0–0	2–2	1–0	2–2	3–1	2–1	2–3	2–1	2–1	2–1	1–2	1–1	4–1	

Updated to match(es) played on unknown. Source: Ian Laschke: Rothmans Book of Football League Records 1888–89 to 1978–79. Macdonald and Jane’s, London & Sydney, 1980.
Legend: Blue = home team win; Yellow = draw; Red = away team win.

=== Maps ===
Locations of the Football League Second Division London teams
Locations of the Football League Second Division teams

== Third Division North ==
Football League Third Division North
- Season: 1927–28
- Champions: Bradford Park Avenue (1st title)
- Failed re-election: Durham City
- Matches: 462
- Goals: 1,676 (3.63 per match)
- Top goalscorer: Joe Smith (Stockport County), 38

Pos	Team	Pld	W	D	L	GF	GA	GAv	Pts	Promotion or relegation
1	Bradford (Park Avenue) (C, P)	42	27	9	6	101	45	2.244	63	Promotion to the Second Division
2	Lincoln City	42	24	7	11	91	64	1.422	55	
3	Stockport County	42	23	8	11	89	51	1.745	54	
4	Doncaster Rovers	42	23	7	12	80	44	1.818	53	
5	Tranmere Rovers	42	22	9	11	105	72	1.458	53	
6	Bradford City	42	18	12	12	85	60	1.417	48	
7	Darlington	42	21	5	16	89	74	1.203	47	
8	Southport	42	20	5	17	79	70	1.129	45	
9	Accrington Stanley	42	18	8	16	76	67	1.134	44	
10	New Brighton	42	14	14	14	72	62	1.161	42	
11	Wrexham	42	18	6	18	64	67	0.955	42	
12	Halifax Town	42	13	15	14	73	71	1.028	41	
13	Rochdale	42	17	7	18	74	77	0.961	41	
14	Rotherham United	42	14	11	17	65	69	0.942	39	
15	Hartlepools United	42	16	6	20	69	81	0.852	38	
16	Chesterfield	42	13	10	19	71	78	0.910	36	
17	Crewe Alexandra	42	12	10	20	77	86	0.895	34	
18	Ashington	42	11	11	20	77	103	0.748	33	
19	Barrow	42	10	11	21	54	102	0.529	31	
20	Wigan Borough	42	10	10	22	56	97	0.577	30	
21	Durham City (R)	42	11	7	24	53	100	0.530	29	Failed re-election and demoted
22	Nelson	42	10	6	26	76	136	0.559	26	Re-elected

Source: rsssf.com
(C) Champions; (P) Promoted; (R) Relegated

=== Results ===
Home \ Away	ACC	ASH	BRW	BRA	BPA	CHF	CRE	DAR	DON	DUR	HAL	HAR	LIN	NEL	NWB	ROC	ROT	SOU	STP	TRA	WIG	WRE
Accrington Stanley		3–1	5–1	1–1	2–1	0–0	5–0	0–0	1–3	2–0	3–2	2–2	1–0	7–1	2–1	1–0	3–1	4–1	1–0	2–3	2–4	2–0
Ashington	1–1		1–0	2–2	0–3	0–0	0–2	2–3	1–2	2–2	3–3	3–1	4–5	5–1	3–2	5–1	6–0	1–3	4–1	3–0	6–3	2–1
Barrow	1–0	1–1		0–0	0–0	2–0	1–1	2–0	0–0	1–2	6–2	2–0	3–3	3–1	2–1	1–3	1–1	3–1	2–3	2–1	6–2	2–2
Bradford City	2–0	5–0	4–1		2–3	3–3	4–1	0–1	1–0	4–0	0–0	2–1	3–1	9–1	3–1	2–2	3–1	2–0	2–2	3–1	3–0	2–0
Bradford Park Avenue	3–3	5–0	1–1	5–0		1–0	2–0	6–3	0–2	4–0	3–2	3–0	3–0	3–2	2–1	4–1	3–1	5–3	2–0	6–2	5–1	2–0
Chesterfield	3–1	3–0	6–0	2–0	0–0		3–2	1–3	1–0	4–2	3–0	1–3	0–1	6–0	2–3	1–3	2–5	5–2	1–1	2–2	0–0	0–1
Crewe Alexandra	2–3	3–0	4–1	2–1	1–3	4–1		3–3	4–1	5–2	1–1	4–0	0–0	6–1	1–1	1–1	3–2	0–1	3–0	2–3	1–2	1–1
Darlington	3–0	5–1	1–1	1–2	1–3	4–2	1–3		3–0	5–0	2–0	5–0	9–2	4–1	3–0	1–0	4–1	3–1	3–1	3–7	1–0	1–3
Doncaster Rovers	0–0	3–2	4–0	2–1	2–0	4–0	3–1	5–0		5–0	1–1	1–1	3–0	4–2	5–1	5–2	2–0	0–1	0–2	5–2	4–1	1–1
Durham City	2–1	0–0	4–1	3–2	0–1	2–0	5–1	3–3	1–3		1–1	1–0	0–4	3–0	2–1	3–2	1–4	0–0	1–2	1–3	3–0	1–1
Halifax Town	3–1	6–1	5–2	2–1	1–1	1–2	0–0	2–1	0–1	3–1		4–1	3–1	5–1	1–1	1–1	0–0	1–0	1–3	2–2	2–2	4–1
Hartlepool	0–2	4–1	6–2	2–3	1–1	1–0	4–3	0–1	1–0	2–1	0–1		1–2	4–5	3–3	0–2	1–3	2–1	2–1	2–0	1–1	4–2
Lincoln City	3–1	3–1	5–0	2–2	2–0	0–0	5–2	1–0	2–0	2–1	5–2	1–5		0–0	1–2	3–1	4–1	2–0	2–0	1–1	4–1	5–0
Nelson	1–4	1–5	4–0	0–3	1–2	3–3	3–3	4–0	0–1	2–1	3–2	4–2	1–3		0–3	6–3	6–1	1–1	0–4	3–5	3–3	4–0
New Brighton	3–1	6–0	3–3	1–1	1–2	3–3	5–1	0–0	3–1	4–0	3–1	2–1	2–3	4–0		2–1	1–1	0–1	0–0	0–1	2–1	0–0
Rochdale	3–2	2–2	3–0	3–3	0–4	5–1	4–0	4–1	1–0	1–0	2–2	0–1	0–3	1–0	0–0		2–1	5–1	2–1	1–2	3–0	3–0
Rotherham United	2–1	1–1	3–0	0–0	1–0	1–2	2–0	3–1	2–1	1–1	0–0	5–0	2–4	4–3	0–0	3–1		1–1	0–1	2–1	6–0	0–1
Southport	5–0	3–3	4–0	5–1	2–1	2–1	3–2	2–0	1–2	3–1	3–1	0–2	3–1	1–2	4–2	3–1	1–1		4–0	0–1	2–1	4–1
Stockport County	3–3	3–0	4–0	3–0	2–2	3–0	1–0	4–0	2–1	2–1	3–0	2–2	2–0	8–0	0–0	5–1	2–0	6–3		1–0	1–1	5–0
Tranmere	3–2	5–3	5–0	2–1	2–2	6–3	3–3	3–1	0–0	11–1	2–2	1–2	2–2	1–1	4–0	3–0	2–0	1–0	5–2		5–2	2–1
Wigan Borough	2–0	0–0	1–0	2–2	1–3	3–2	2–1	0–3	1–1	3–0	1–3	0–2	1–3	4–2	2–2	1–2	0–0	1–3	1–3	1–0		3–0
Wrexham	0–1	5–1	5–0	1–0	1–1	1–2	2–0	1–2	1–2	4–0	2–0	3–2	1–0	5–2	0–2	2–1	3–2	3–0	1–0	2–0	5–1	

Updated to match(es) played on unknown. Source: Ian Laschke: Rothmans Book of Football League Records 1888–89 to 1978–79. Macdonald and Jane’s, London & Sydney, 1980.
Legend: Blue = home team win; Yellow = draw; Red = away team win.

=== Maps ===
Locations of the Football League Third Division North teams

== Third Division South ==
Football League Third Division South
- Season: 1927–28
- Champions: Millwall (1st title)
- Failed re-election: None
- Matches: 462
- Goals: 1,680 (3.64 per match)
- Top goalscorer: Harry Morris (Swindon Town), 38

Pos	Team	Pld	W	D	L	GF	GA	GAv	Pts	Promotion
1	Millwall (C, P)	42	30	5	7	127	50	2.540	65	Promotion to the Second Division
2	Northampton Town	42	23	9	10	102	64	1.594	55	
3	Plymouth Argyle	42	23	7	12	85	54	1.574	53	
4	Brighton & Hove Albion	42	19	10	13	81	69	1.174	48	
5	Crystal Palace	42	18	12	12	79	72	1.097	48	
6	Swindon Town	42	19	9	14	90	69	1.304	47	
7	Southend United	42	20	6	16	80	64	1.250	46	
8	Exeter City	42	17	12	13	70	60	1.167	46	
9	Newport County	42	18	9	15	81	84	0.964	45	
10	Queens Park Rangers	42	17	9	16	72	71	1.014	43	
11	Charlton Athletic	42	15	13	14	60	70	0.857	43	
12	Brentford	42	16	8	18	76	74	1.027	40	
13	Luton Town	42	16	7	19	94	87	1.080	39	
14	Bournemouth & Boscombe Athletic	42	13	12	17	72	79	0.911	38	
15	Watford	42	14	10	18	68	78	0.872	38	
16	Gillingham	42	13	11	18	62	81	0.765	37	
17	Norwich City	42	10	16	16	66	70	0.943	36	
18	Walsall	42	12	9	21	75	101	0.743	33	
19	Bristol Rovers	42	14	4	24	67	93	0.720	32	
20	Coventry City	42	11	9	22	67	96	0.698	31	
21	Merthyr Town	42	9	13	20	53	91	0.582	31	Re-elected
22	Torquay United	42	8	14	20	53	103	0.515	30	Re-elected

(C) Champions; (P) Promoted

=== Results ===
Home \ Away	B&BA	BRE	B&HA	BRR	CHA	COV	CRY	EXE	GIL	LUT	MER	MIL	NPC	NOR	NWC	PLY	QPR	STD	SWI	TOR	WAL	WAT
Bournemouth & Boscombe Athletic		1–0	3–1	4–3	3–1	2–3	2–2	2–0	3–0	2–2	2–1	5–0	0–0	1–1	2–1	2–2	1–2	2–3	2–0	1–1	3–1	1–0
Brentford	2–1		1–3	5–1	1–1	4–1	2–1	1–1	2–0	4–2	4–0	6–1	3–1	3–0	3–1	0–2	0–3	2–2	1–4	1–2	3–2	1–1
Brighton & Hove Albion	3–2	5–2		5–0	2–2	3–0	4–2	0–2	0–0	3–1	5–0	3–1	1–4	2–1	1–0	4–1	1–3	1–0	4–2	3–0	0–0	1–1
Bristol Rovers	3–0	1–3	1–0		2–1	1–1	1–1	1–2	2–4	1–2	2–1	1–6	2–1	2–2	3–0	3–1	0–4	1–3	1–0	5–1	5–2	3–1
Charlton Athletic	1–1	3–2	3–0	2–1		2–1	0–4	0–0	1–0	4–3	0–0	1–1	3–2	2–2	3–2	2–0	1–0	1–2	3–1	1–0	1–3	0–2
Coventry City	3–2	0–0	2–2	2–3	3–3		2–2	0–0	1–2	4–2	1–2	0–3	0–2	2–4	2–2	1–1	0–0	6–1	4–0	5–1	0–1	2–3
Crystal Palace	6–1	0–2	1–1	3–2	5–0	1–0		2–0	2–2	3–2	2–0	0–4	2–0	1–0	2–1	0–2	1–1	4–1	1–0	3–2	5–1	2–1
Exeter City	4–1	0–1	0–3	4–1	2–1	0–1	2–2		2–2	3–2	2–0	2–4	5–1	1–1	2–2	2–0	4–0	3–2	0–0	5–0	3–0	3–3
Gillingham	2–1	2–1	0–1	3–1	1–1	1–2	3–1	1–1		0–4	1–1	0–1	4–0	1–3	3–0	3–1	1–2	1–0	0–1	4–1	2–0	0–3
Luton Town	3–3	5–2	2–5	2–0	2–1	3–1	6–1	2–1	6–1		5–1	1–1	1–1	2–0	1–3	1–1	0–1	0–0	2–1	5–0	4–1	3–2
Merthyr Town	1–1	3–1	4–2	2–3	0–0	3–2	2–2	0–3	3–1	0–0		0–0	0–2	1–3	1–1	1–4	0–4	2–3	8–2	1–3	3–2	3–1
Millwall	2–0	3–0	6–0	1–0	5–0	9–1	1–1	2–0	6–0	3–2	3–0		5–1	3–0	2–1	2–0	6–1	5–1	3–3	9–1	7–1	4–2
Newport County	4–3	3–0	3–1	3–1	4–3	3–0	0–3	1–0	1–1	7–2	1–1	1–3		4–1	2–2	1–1	1–6	3–2	1–3	2–2	4–1	3–2
Northampton Town	1–1	3–2	1–0	2–0	2–1	2–1	1–1	5–0	1–0	6–5	6–0	5–2	1–2		4–2	2–1	1–0	2–1	3–0	4–4	10–0	5–0
Norwich City	3–3	1–1	0–0	4–2	0–0	0–2	4–1	2–2	0–0	3–0	4–0	2–0	1–1	3–4		2–0	3–1	2–1	1–3	4–0	1–4	1–1
Plymouth Argyle	3–1	1–0	2–0	4–1	2–0	4–0	5–1	1–2	2–2	4–0	5–0	3–2	2–0	3–3	4–2		3–0	3–2	3–0	4–1	2–1	0–1
Queens Park Rangers	2–0	2–3	5–0	4–2	3–3	1–5	2–0	0–1	3–3	3–2	0–0	0–1	4–2	0–4	0–0	0–1		3–2	0–1	2–3	1–1	2–1
Southend	3–0	3–2	0–1	2–1	1–2	3–2	6–1	1–2	1–2	1–0	2–1	0–1	5–1	2–0	1–1	3–0	7–0		1–1	1–0	2–1	3–0
Swindon Town	3–2	1–1	4–3	2–1	2–2	6–0	3–3	3–0	6–1	4–2	1–2	3–0	4–1	4–0	1–1	2–2	0–2	0–1		2–2	5–0	4–0
Torquay United	2–2	2–1	1–1	0–0	1–2	2–3	0–2	1–1	1–1	0–4	2–2	0–1	1–1	1–5	4–2	1–2	1–0	3–3	2–1		1–1	1–1
Walsall	2–3	4–2	3–3	1–2	1–0	7–0	1–1	5–1	7–4	4–1	2–2	2–5	0–3	1–1	1–1	2–1	2–2	0–1	1–2	4–0		2–0
Watford	2–0	1–1	3–3	2–1	1–2	3–1	2–1	3–2	5–3	1–0	1–1	0–3	2–3	2–0	2–0	1–2	3–3	1–1	2–5	1–2	4–0	

Updated to match(es) played on unknown. Source: Ian Laschke: Rothmans Book of Football League Records 1888–89 to 1978–79. Macdonald and Jane’s, London & Sydney, 1980.
Legend: Blue = home team win; Yellow = draw; Red = away team win.

=== Maps ===
Locations of the Football League Third Division South London teams
Locations of the Football League Third Division South teams

== Attendances ==
=== Division One ===
No.	Club	Average
1	Everton FC	37,461
2	Aston Villa FC	32,505
3	Newcastle United FC	30,195
4	Liverpool FC	29,975
5	Arsenal FC	27,434
6	Manchester United	25,555
7	Leicester City FC	24,758
8	Portsmouth FC	22,752
9	Middlesbrough FC	22,632
10	The Wednesday	22,075
11	Tottenham Hotspur FC	21,928
12	West Ham United FC	21,419
13	Sunderland AFC	21,411
14	Birmingham City FC	21,217
15	Sheffield United FC	19,482
16	Bolton Wanderers FC	19,383
17	Huddersfield Town AFC	19,306
18	Blackburn Rovers FC	19,120
19	Burnley FC	17,408
20	Derby County FC	16,243
21	Bury FC	15,608
22	Cardiff City FC	15,607

=== Division Two ===
No.	Club	Average
1	Manchester City FC	37,468
2	Chelsea FC	33,546
3	Leeds United FC	21,829
4	Preston North End FC	17,537
5	West Bromwich Albion FC	17,381
6	Fulham FC	16,121
7	Bristol City FC	15,845
8	Wolverhampton Wanderers FC	15,298
9	Stoke City FC	14,395
10	Oldham Athletic FC	13,893
11	Leyton Orient FC	13,262
12	Swansea City AFC	12,153
13	Blackpool FC	11,421
14	Grimsby Town FC	11,237
15	Reading FC	11,215
16	Port Vale FC	11,121
17	Notts County FC	11,065
18	Nottingham Forest FC	10,478
19	Southampton FC	10,177
20	Hull City AFC	9,049
21	Barnsley FC	8,352
22	Gateshead AFC	5,379

== See also ==
- 1927-28 in English football
- 1927 in association football
- 1928 in association football
