= 1942 in association football =

The following are the football (soccer) events of the year 1942 throughout the world.

== Winners club national championship ==
- Argentina: River Plate
- Austria: Vienna
- Chile: Santiago Morning
- Costa Rica: CS La Libertad
- Croatia: Concordia Zagreb
- Germany: FC Schalke 04
- Italy: A.S. Roma
- Mexico: Spain (Mexican football team)
- Netherlands: ADO Den Haag
- Scotland:
  - Scottish Cup: No competition
- Spain: Valencia C.F.
- Switzerland: Grasshoppers
- Turkey: Harb Okulu
- Uruguay: Nacional

== Births ==
- January 22: Mimis Domazos, Greek footballer (died 2025)
- January 25: Eusébio, Portuguese international footballer (died 2014)
- February 27: Klaus-Dieter Sieloff, German international footballer (died 2011)
- February 28: Dino Zoff, Italian international footballer and coach
- April 19: Javier Fragoso, Mexican international footballer (died 2014)
- May 18: Nobby Stiles, English international footballer (died 2020)
- July: Shidrak Yousif, Iraqi international footballer (died 2025)
- July 2: Juan Cutillas, Spanish football player and manager (died 2025)
- July 5: Hannes Löhr, German international footballer and coach (died 2016)
- July 18: Giacinto Facchetti, Italian international footballer (died 2006)
- August 2
  - Leo Beenhakker, Dutch footballer and coach (died 2025)
  - Ilija Pantelić, Serbian Yugoslav international footballer (died 2014)
- August 7: Sigfried Held, German international footballer and coach
- October 1: Constantin Frățilă, Romanian international footballer (died 2016)
- October 3: Roberto Perfumo, Argentine international footballer (died 2016)
- October 7: Arthur Wilkie, English former footballer
- November 9: Nobby Upton, English former professional footballer
- December 3: Pedro Rocha, Uruguayan international footballer and manager (died 2013)
- December 17: Roy Thurnham, English former professional footballer
