= 1925–26 Football League =

34th season of the Football League

The Football League
- Season: 1925–26
- Champions: Huddersfield Town

The 1925–26 season was the 34th season of The Football League. This was the first season with the modern offside rule, where two defenders (as opposed to three, the rule before this season) needed to be in front of the attacker for him to be onside; as a result, offensive play flourished, with the number of goals scored in the First Division increasing from 1,192 to 1,703.

== Final league tables ==
The tables below are reproduced here in the exact form that they can be found at The Rec.Sport.Soccer Statistics Foundation website and in Rothmans Book of Football League Records 1888–89 to 1978–79, with home and away statistics separated.

Match results are drawn from Rothmans for all divisions.

Beginning with the season 1894–95, clubs finishing level on points were separated according to goal average (goals scored divided by goals conceded), or more properly put, goal ratio. In case one or more teams had the same goal difference, this system favoured those teams who had scored fewer goals. The goal average system was eventually scrapped beginning with the 1976–77 season. From the 1922–23 season on, re-election was required of the bottom two teams of both Third Division North and Third Division South.

== First Division ==
First Division
- Season: 1925–26
- Champions: Huddersfield Town; 3rd English title
- Relegated: Manchester City; Notts County
- Matches: 462
- Goals: 1,703 (3.69 per match)
- Top goalscorer: Ted Harper (43 goals)
- Biggest home win: Aston Villa 10–0 Burnley (29 April 1926)
- Biggest away win: Newcastle United 1–7 Blackburn Rovers (9 September 1925); Birmingham 1–7 Burnley (10 April 1926)
- Highest scoring: Sheffield United 11–2 Cardiff City (1 January 1926)

Pos	Team	Pld	W	D	L	GF	GA	GAv	Pts	Relegation
1	Huddersfield Town (C)	42	23	11	8	92	60	1.533	57	
2	Arsenal	42	22	8	12	87	63	1.381	52	
3	Sunderland	42	21	6	15	96	80	1.200	48	
4	Bury	42	20	7	15	85	77	1.104	47	
5	Sheffield United	42	19	8	15	102	82	1.244	46	
6	Aston Villa	42	16	12	14	86	76	1.132	44	
7	Liverpool	42	14	16	12	70	63	1.111	44	
8	Bolton Wanderers	42	17	10	15	75	76	0.987	44	
9	Manchester United	42	19	6	17	66	73	0.904	44	
10	Newcastle United	42	16	10	16	84	75	1.120	42	
11	Everton	42	12	18	12	72	70	1.029	42	
12	Blackburn Rovers	42	15	11	16	91	80	1.138	41	
13	West Bromwich Albion	42	16	8	18	79	78	1.013	40	
14	Birmingham	42	16	8	18	66	81	0.815	40	
15	Tottenham Hotspur	42	15	9	18	66	79	0.835	39	
16	Cardiff City	42	16	7	19	61	76	0.803	39	
17	Leicester City	42	14	10	18	70	80	0.875	38	
18	West Ham United	42	15	7	20	63	76	0.829	37	
19	Leeds United	42	14	8	20	64	76	0.842	36	
20	Burnley	42	13	10	19	85	108	0.787	36	
21	Manchester City (R)	42	12	11	19	89	100	0.890	35	Relegation to the Second Division
22	Notts County (R)	42	13	7	22	54	74	0.730	33	Relegation to the Second Division

Source: World Football
Rules for classification: 1) Points; 2) Goal average; 3) Goals scored
(C) Champions; (R) Relegated

=== Results ===
Home \ Away	ARS	AST	BIR	BLB	BOL	BUR	BRY	CAR	EVE	HUD	LEE	LEI	LIV	MCI	MUN	NEW	NTC	SHU	SUN	TOT	WBA	WHU
Arsenal		2–0	3–0	4–2	2–3	1–2	6–1	5–0	4–1	3–1	4–1	2–2	1–1	1–0	3–2	3–0	3–0	4–0	2–0	0–1	1–0	3–2
Aston Villa	3–0		3–3	1–2	2–2	10–0	1–1	0–2	3–1	3–0	3–1	2–2	3–0	3–1	2–2	2–2	2–1	2–2	4–2	3–0	2–1	2–0
Birmingham	1–0	2–1		2–0	0–1	1–7	2–3	3–2	3–1	1–3	2–1	1–1	2–0	1–0	2–1	1–1	0–1	2–0	2–1	3–1	3–0	1–0
Blackburn Rovers	2–3	3–1	4–4		3–0	6–3	1–2	6–3	2–2	2–1	2–2	0–0	1–1	3–3	7–0	1–2	4–1	3–1	3–0	4–2	1–2	1–0
Bolton Wanderers	1–1	1–3	5–3	2–2		4–2	3–2	0–1	0–2	6–1	1–0	2–2	0–1	5–1	3–1	2–2	2–1	2–1	3–2	1–1	2–2	1–0
Burnley	2–2	2–3	3–1	1–3	1–1		2–2	4–1	1–3	1–1	6–3	4–0	2–1	1–2	0–1	1–0	0–0	1–1	5–2	1–2	3–4	2–2
Bury	2–2	2–3	2–1	3–1	0–5	8–1		4–1	1–0	0–0	0–2	4–0	0–1	6–5	1–3	1–1	3–1	7–4	2–2	3–0	2–0	4–1
Cardiff City	0–0	2–0	2–0	4–1	0–1	2–3	3–2		2–1	1–2	0–0	5–2	2–2	2–2	0–2	0–0	2–1	0–1	0–1	0–1	3–2	0–1
Everton	2–3	1–1	2–2	3–0	2–1	1–1	1–1	1–1		2–3	4–2	1–0	3–3	1–1	1–3	3–0	3–0	2–2	2–1	1–1	4–0	2–0
Huddersfield Town	2–2	5–1	4–1	3–1	3–0	2–1	2–1	1–1	3–0		3–1	3–0	0–0	2–2	5–0	0–1	2–0	4–1	1–1	2–1	1–1	2–1
Leeds United	4–2	2–2	0–0	2–1	2–1	2–2	2–3	1–0	1–1	0–4		1–0	1–1	3–4	2–0	2–0	2–1	2–0	0–2	4–1	0–1	5–2
Leicester City	0–1	1–2	1–0	2–1	5–2	3–2	0–2	1–2	1–1	2–0	1–3		3–1	2–3	1–3	3–2	1–0	2–2	4–1	5–3	3–0	1–1
Liverpool	3–0	3–1	2–2	2–2	2–2	3–2	0–1	0–2	5–1	1–2	1–1	0–3		2–1	5–0	6–3	2–0	2–2	2–2	0–0	2–0	0–0
Manchester City	2–5	4–2	2–4	0–1	1–1	8–3	0–2	3–2	4–4	1–5	2–1	5–1	1–1		1–1	2–2	1–1	2–4	4–1	0–0	3–1	2–0
Manchester United	0–1	3–0	3–1	2–0	2–1	6–1	0–1	1–0	0–0	1–1	2–1	3–2	3–3	1–6		2–1	0–1	1–2	5–1	0–0	3–2	2–1
Newcastle United	7–0	2–2	1–3	1–7	5–1	1–3	4–0	0–1	3–3	0–2	3–0	3–2	3–0	3–2	4–1		6–3	3–1	0–0	3–1	3–0	4–1
Notts County	4–1	1–0	3–0	1–1	3–0	0–1	4–1	2–4	0–3	4–2	1–0	2–2	1–2	1–0	0–3	1–3		2–0	2–0	4–2	0–0	1–1
Sheffield United	4–0	4–1	4–1	1–1	2–0	6–1	3–1	11–2	1–1	2–3	2–0	2–4	3–1	8–3	2–0	4–3	3–0		4–1	2–3	3–2	1–1
Sunderland	2–1	3–2	3–1	6–2	2–1	2–2	1–0	1–3	7–3	4–1	1–3	3–0	3–2	5–3	2–1	2–2	3–1	6–1		3–0	4–0	4–1
Tottenham Hotspur	1–1	2–2	2–1	4–2	2–3	0–2	4–2	1–2	1–1	5–5	3–2	1–3	3–1	1–0	0–1	1–0	4–0	3–2	0–2		3–2	4–2
West Bromwich Albion	2–1	1–1	5–1	1–1	0–3	5–3	4–0	3–0	1–1	2–2	3–0	3–1	0–3	4–1	5–1	4–0	4–4	2–0	2–5	1–0		7–1
West Ham United	0–4	5–2	2–2	2–1	6–0	2–0	0–2	3–1	1–0	2–3	4–2	1–1	1–2	3–1	1–0	1–0	1–0	1–3	3–2	3–1	3–0	

Updated to match(es) played on unknown. Source:
Legend: Blue = home team win; Yellow = draw; Red = away team win.

=== Maps ===
Locations of the Football League First Division London teams
Locations of the Football League First Division teams

== Second Division ==
Football League Second Division
- Season: 1925–26
- Champions: The Wednesday (2nd title)
- Relegated: Stockport County; Stoke
- Matches: 462
- Goals: 1,487 (3.22 per match)
- Top goalscorer: Jimmy Trotter (The Wednesday), 37
- Biggest home win: Darlington – Portsmouth 7–1 (24 Oct 1925); Wolverhampton Wanderers – Barnsley 7–1 (26 Apr 1926); Darlington – Clapton Orient 6–0 (13 Feb 1926)
- Biggest away win: Port Vale – Chelsea 0–6 (5 Sept 1925)
- Highest scoring: Oldham Athletic – Nottingham Forest 8–3 (1 Mar 1926)

Pos	Team	Pld	W	D	L	GF	GA	GAv	Pts	Promotion or relegation
1	The Wednesday (C, P)	42	27	6	9	88	48	1.833	60	Promotion to the First Division
2	Derby County (P)	42	25	7	10	77	42	1.833	57	Promotion to the First Division
3	Chelsea	42	19	14	9	76	49	1.551	52	
4	Wolverhampton Wanderers	42	21	7	14	84	60	1.400	49	
5	Swansea Town	42	19	11	12	77	57	1.351	49	
6	Blackpool	42	17	11	14	76	69	1.101	45	
7	Oldham Athletic	42	18	8	16	74	62	1.194	44	
8	Port Vale	42	19	6	17	79	69	1.145	44	
9	South Shields	42	18	8	16	74	65	1.138	44	
10	Middlesbrough	42	21	2	19	77	68	1.132	44	
11	Portsmouth	42	17	10	15	79	74	1.068	44	
12	Preston North End	42	18	7	17	71	84	0.845	43	
13	Hull City	42	16	9	17	63	61	1.033	41	
14	Southampton	42	15	8	19	63	63	1.000	38	
15	Darlington	42	14	10	18	72	77	0.935	38	
16	Bradford City	42	13	10	19	47	66	0.712	36	
17	Nottingham Forest	42	14	8	20	51	73	0.699	36	
18	Barnsley	42	12	12	18	58	84	0.690	36	
19	Fulham	42	11	12	19	46	77	0.597	34	
20	Clapton Orient	42	12	9	21	50	65	0.769	33	
21	Stoke City (R)	42	12	8	22	54	77	0.701	32	Relegation to the Third Division North
22	Stockport County (R)	42	8	9	25	51	97	0.526	25	Relegation to the Third Division North

(C) Champions; (P) Promoted; (R) Relegated

=== Results ===
Home \ Away	BAR	BLP	BRA	CHE	CLA	DAR	DER	FUL	HUL	MID	NOT	OLD	POR	PTV	PNE	SOU	SSH	STP	STK	SWA	WED	WOL
Barnsley		2–0	0–0	2–3	3–1	1–1	0–1	2–2	2–1	0–1	4–1	3–4	2–2	3–0	2–0	2–0	3–1	1–1	2–1	2–0	1–1	1–1
Blackpool	4–0		3–0	0–0	3–0	0–1	1–2	2–0	2–2	2–3	3–0	2–1	2–2	2–2	3–1	2–1	1–0	4–1	0–0	0–0	1–0	4–0
Bradford City	4–1	1–0		4–2	0–3	2–0	0–0	0–0	0–1	2–0	0–1	1–1	0–1	2–0	2–0	0–5	1–1	2–2	2–1	3–1	1–4	1–2
Chelsea	3–2	2–3	2–0		1–3	5–2	2–1	4–0	4–0	0–1	0–0	3–0	0–0	3–1	5–0	0–0	0–0	3–2	1–1	1–3	0–0	3–3
Clapton Orient	4–0	2–2	3–1	1–2		1–2	0–1	1–1	0–0	1–0	0–1	1–2	1–1	1–2	1–1	2–1	1–2	2–1	4–0	2–0	0–0	2–1
Darlington	2–2	1–3	1–3	1–1	6–0		3–0	1–2	1–2	0–2	0–0	1–0	7–1	4–0	1–1	3–1	4–1	3–2	1–2	3–3	5–1	3–4
Derby County	4–0	5–2	0–0	4–2	3–1	0–2		3–1	3–1	2–0	2–0	1–0	0–2	2–0	2–0	2–2	2–0	4–0	7–3	5–0	4–1	2–0
Fulham	2–2	1–1	2–0	0–3	0–2	4–0	1–1		1–1	2–0	0–2	2–1	2–3	3–3	2–1	1–1	2–1	1–0	2–4	0–1	3–0	1–2
Hull City	2–2	1–2	5–0	0–1	2–0	1–1	0–0	1–0		1–2	4–1	1–2	1–0	3–0	1–1	4–0	1–3	4–0	1–0	4–2	0–1	3–1
Middlesbrough	5–0	3–2	2–5	1–2	1–2	3–2	1–2	4–0	3–3		1–0	2–1	4–1	3–1	5–1	3–0	1–2	4–0	3–0	0–3	3–0	4–1
Nottingham Forest	4–2	1–1	0–0	1–5	1–0	2–0	1–2	2–2	4–0	1–0		1–1	3–1	2–0	4–0	1–2	4–1	2–0	1–2	0–2	2–0	1–4
Oldham Athletic	2–1	3–2	3–0	1–1	1–1	0–1	2–0	4–0	2–1	4–1	8–3		1–3	3–2	3–2	1–0	2–1	3–0	7–2	0–0	1–1	1–2
Portsmouth	1–2	2–0	3–1	4–0	3–2	2–0	2–2	0–0	2–2	1–5	5–1	0–2		3–2	5–2	1–2	4–2	4–0	2–0	0–0	1–2	3–0
Port Vale	3–0	5–0	2–0	0–6	4–2	6–1	0–1	0–1	3–1	4–0	1–1	3–0	1–1		3–0	1–1	2–0	2–0	3–0	3–0	4–3	3–0
Preston North End	4–2	6–4	3–1	3–1	4–1	0–0	2–1	2–1	4–0	1–0	2–0	2–1	3–2	4–0		2–2	0–4	5–3	2–0	4–2	0–3	1–0
Southampton	0–0	2–2	1–2	0–1	2–0	4–1	2–1	2–0	0–2	3–1	2–0	3–1	1–3	2–3	2–0		0–1	3–0	1–2	4–1	1–2	4–2
South Shields	3–0	3–4	1–3	0–0	1–0	2–4	0–0	5–2	1–3	2–2	3–1	0–0	5–1	5–2	1–1	2–0		4–2	5–1	3–1	1–1	3–1
Stockport County	1–1	4–3	1–1	0–0	3–2	1–1	3–0	1–2	0–1	1–2	3–0	1–0	3–3	2–2	1–1	1–2	4–1		2–1	1–3	0–2	1–0
Stoke	1–2	1–3	1–0	1–3	0–0	6–1	0–1	5–0	3–1	4–0	1–1	1–0	2–1	0–3	1–3	1–1	0–1	3–0		1–1	0–1	0–0
Swansea Town	3–0	6–1	1–0	0–0	0–0	1–1	2–0	6–0	2–0	4–0	3–0	3–3	1–0	1–0	4–1	3–1	1–2	4–0	1–1		2–2	2–4
The Wednesday	3–0	2–0	5–1	4–1	3–0	4–0	1–4	3–0	2–0	2–0	2–0	5–1	4–2	0–2	5–1	2–1	1–0	6–2	2–0	3–1		2–1
Wolverhampton Wanderers	7–1	0–0	1–1	0–0	3–0	1–0	2–0	0–0	3–1	3–1	4–0	2–1	4–1	3–1	3–0	4–1	2–0	5–1	5–1	2–3	1–2	

Updated to match(es) played on unknown. Source: Ian Laschke: Rothmans Book of Football League Records 1888–89 to 1978–79. Macdonald and Jane’s, London & Sydney, 1980.
Legend: Blue = home team win; Yellow = draw; Red = away team win.

=== Maps ===
Locations of the Football League Second Division London teams
Locations of the Football League Second Division teams

== Third Division North ==
Football League Third Division North
- Season: 1925–26
- Champions: Grimsby Town (1st title)
- Failed re-election: None
- Matches: 462
- Goals: 1,628 (3.52 per match)
- Top goalscorer: Jimmy Cookson (Chesterfield), 44

Pos	Team	Pld	W	D	L	GF	GA	GAv	Pts	Promotion
1	Grimsby Town (C, P)	42	26	9	7	91	40	2.275	61	Promotion to the Second Division
2	Bradford (Park Avenue)	42	26	8	8	101	43	2.349	60	
3	Rochdale	42	27	5	10	104	58	1.793	59	
4	Chesterfield	42	25	5	12	100	54	1.852	55	
5	Halifax Town	42	17	11	14	53	50	1.060	45	
6	Hartlepools United	42	18	8	16	82	73	1.123	44	
7	Tranmere Rovers	42	19	6	17	73	83	0.880	44	
8	Nelson	42	16	11	15	89	71	1.254	43	
9	Ashington	42	16	11	15	70	62	1.129	43	
10	Doncaster Rovers	42	16	11	15	80	72	1.111	43	
11	Crewe Alexandra	42	17	9	16	63	61	1.033	43	
12	New Brighton	42	17	8	17	69	67	1.030	42	
13	Durham City	42	18	6	18	63	70	0.900	42	
14	Rotherham United	42	17	7	18	69	92	0.750	41	
15	Lincoln City	42	17	5	20	66	82	0.805	39	
16	Coventry City	42	16	6	20	73	82	0.890	38	Transferred to the Third Division South
17	Wigan Borough	42	13	11	18	68	74	0.919	37	
18	Accrington Stanley	42	17	3	22	81	105	0.771	37	
19	Wrexham	42	11	10	21	63	92	0.685	32	
20	Southport	42	11	10	21	62	92	0.674	32	
21	Walsall	42	10	6	26	58	107	0.542	26	Re-elected
22	Barrow	42	7	4	31	50	98	0.510	18	Re-elected

(C) Champions; (P) Promoted

=== Results ===
Home \ Away	ACC	ASH	BRW	BPA	CHF	COV	CRE	DON	DUR	GRI	HAL	HAR	LIN	NEL	NWB	ROC	ROT	SOU	TRA	WAL	WIG	WRE
Accrington Stanley		2–1	2–0	1–4	2–0	3–1	2–0	2–3	3–1	1–0	0–1	1–2	3–1	3–2	0–2	1–3	2–3	4–3	4–3	5–2	4–0	4–2
Ashington	3–1		1–4	1–1	0–0	2–0	2–0	6–1	0–1	4–2	0–1	2–0	4–1	5–1	1–1	0–1	4–2	1–1	1–0	2–0	3–3	2–2
Barrow	1–2	2–3		0–1	0–3	1–4	0–1	0–2	1–4	0–3	1–2	1–4	3–0	1–0	2–3	1–3	1–2	0–3	3–3	5–2	1–1	4–3
Bradford Park Avenue	3–0	1–0	3–0		1–0	3–0	3–0	2–0	2–1	0–1	2–2	4–0	4–1	3–0	1–0	3–1	6–1	6–1	3–0	8–0	6–1	1–1
Chesterfield	7–2	6–1	3–1	1–1		4–3	4–2	2–2	2–0	2–0	1–0	5–2	2–0	3–1	3–0	1–2	6–1	3–0	4–0	4–0	4–0	3–1
Coventry City	2–1	2–0	2–0	2–2	2–4		2–1	4–0	3–1	1–1	4–1	5–2	3–2	1–0	0–0	2–2	7–0	0–0	1–2	2–0	0–0	2–0
Crewe Alexandra	3–0	2–1	4–1	1–2	2–0	2–1		2–2	2–0	1–1	0–1	2–1	3–1	1–4	4–1	3–2	3–1	0–1	1–1	2–1	3–1	2–0
Doncaster Rovers	6–2	2–1	0–1	0–3	3–0	8–1	5–2		4–1	1–4	2–2	2–1	1–0	1–1	2–0	2–2	0–0	6–1	4–0	1–1	1–1	1–1
Durham City	5–1	0–0	2–1	2–1	5–2	4–1	1–1	3–0		0–0	2–0	0–0	3–2	0–2	0–0	0–2	5–1	3–2	2–1	4–1	2–0	2–1
Grimsby Town	5–2	3–1	4–0	3–0	1–0	2–0	2–0	3–0	3–1		1–0	2–0	4–0	3–0	1–0	3–0	3–0	3–2	8–0	5–1	1–1	1–0
Halifax Town	1–1	0–0	3–2	1–2	2–0	1–0	1–0	0–3	2–1	0–2		2–1	0–2	1–1	1–0	1–1	5–1	3–0	1–1	5–0	2–0	2–1
Hartlepool	5–1	2–1	2–0	0–3	2–1	3–2	0–0	2–1	1–1	1–1	1–1		4–2	2–0	6–1	4–2	2–1	5–0	3–2	9–3	0–0	5–0
Lincoln City	3–1	2–0	4–3	1–1	2–1	0–3	2–2	3–1	1–0	4–1	0–1	2–1		1–0	3–1	0–2	0–3	3–0	1–3	5–1	2–1	3–2
Nelson	1–0	2–2	3–3	2–2	3–3	4–1	2–1	5–3	4–0	1–1	1–1	5–2	5–2		1–1	1–3	3–0	3–3	7–0	2–0	7–0	5–1
New Brighton	4–1	1–1	2–1	1–1	1–2	5–1	2–3	2–1	1–2	1–4	2–1	3–2	5–0	0–0		3–0	5–1	1–0	3–2	3–2	4–2	2–2
Rochdale	3–2	1–3	2–1	2–0	2–4	4–1	2–0	4–1	5–0	5–2	2–1	6–0	0–1	2–0	2–1		2–2	3–1	3–2	2–0	2–1	1–2
Rotherham United	3–1	5–1	2–1	2–3	0–1	2–1	2–2	1–1	2–0	2–1	1–1	1–0	1–3	1–3	1–0	0–4		5–2	2–0	4–1	1–0	6–2
Southport	1–3	1–1	2–0	2–1	1–3	1–2	0–0	3–3	6–1	0–1	3–1	1–1	3–2	2–1	3–2	1–7	1–1		2–1	1–1	3–1	0–1
Tranmere	2–2	1–4	3–0	3–2	0–4	2–1	2–0	1–0	2–1	0–0	3–1	2–0	2–0	4–2	0–1	3–5	3–1	1–0		2–1	5–1	4–1
Walsall	3–3	2–0	1–2	3–1	3–1	4–1	0–3	2–1	0–1	2–2	3–1	1–2	0–0	0–2	3–1	1–5	4–1	2–2	1–3		0–1	5–1
Wigan Borough	5–0	0–2	4–1	1–3	2–0	5–1	3–1	0–1	4–1	2–2	0–0	1–0	3–3	5–0	3–1	2–2	0–1	3–1	2–2	2–0		6–0
Wrexham	5–6	2–3	0–0	4–2	1–1	3–1	1–1	0–2	3–0	4–1	2–0	2–2	1–1	3–2	1–2	1–0	2–2	3–2	0–2	0–1	1–0	

Updated to match(es) played on unknown. Source: Ian Laschke: Rothmans Book of Football League Records 1888–89 to 1978–79. Macdonald and Jane’s, London & Sydney, 1980.
Legend: Blue = home team win; Yellow = draw; Red = away team win.

=== Maps ===
Locations of the Football League Third Division North teams

== Third Division South ==
Football League Third Division South
- Season: 1925–26
- Champions: Reading (1st title)
- Failed re-election: None
- Matches: 462
- Goals: 1,555 (3.37 per match)
- Top goalscorer: Jack Cock (Plymouth Argyle), 32

Pos	Team	Pld	W	D	L	GF	GA	GAv	Pts	Promotion
1	Reading (C, P)	42	23	11	8	77	52	1.481	57	Promotion to the Second Division
2	Plymouth Argyle	42	24	8	10	107	67	1.597	56	
3	Millwall	42	21	11	10	73	39	1.872	53	
4	Bristol City	42	21	9	12	72	51	1.412	51	
5	Brighton & Hove Albion	42	19	9	14	84	73	1.151	47	
6	Swindon Town	42	20	6	16	69	64	1.078	46	
7	Luton Town	42	18	7	17	80	75	1.067	43	
8	Bournemouth & Boscombe Athletic	42	17	9	16	75	91	0.824	43	
9	Aberdare Athletic	42	17	8	17	74	66	1.121	42	
10	Gillingham	42	17	8	17	53	49	1.082	42	
11	Southend United	42	19	4	19	78	73	1.068	42	
12	Northampton Town	42	17	7	18	82	80	1.025	41	
13	Crystal Palace	42	19	3	20	75	79	0.949	41	
14	Merthyr Town	42	14	11	17	69	75	0.920	39	
15	Watford	42	15	9	18	73	89	0.820	39	
16	Norwich City	42	15	9	18	58	73	0.795	39	
17	Newport County	42	14	10	18	64	74	0.865	38	
18	Brentford	42	16	6	20	69	94	0.734	38	
19	Bristol Rovers	42	15	6	21	66	69	0.957	36	
20	Exeter City	42	15	5	22	72	70	1.029	35	
21	Charlton Athletic	42	11	13	18	48	68	0.706	35	Re-elected
22	Queens Park Rangers	42	6	9	27	37	84	0.440	21	Re-elected

(C) Champions; (P) Promoted

=== Results ===
Home \ Away	ADE	B&BA	BRE	B&HA	BRI	BRR	CHA	CRY	EXE	GIL	LUT	MER	MIL	NPC	NOR	NWC	PLY	QPR	REA	STD	SWI	WAT
Aberdare Athletic		3–3	3–0	2–2	3–3	0–1	3–1	2–0	5–0	0–1	2–5	0–0	1–2	2–0	1–0	3–1	6–1	1–0	2–2	2–0	1–1	8–1
Bournemouth & Boscombe Athletic	3–0		3–2	0–3	1–1	2–0	4–1	6–1	2–1	1–2	2–2	2–1	0–0	0–2	4–2	2–2	1–2	4–1	1–1	1–2	2–0	3–4
Brentford	1–0	0–2		1–6	2–1	4–1	4–0	3–2	2–0	0–0	1–0	1–1	2–0	3–3	3–4	5–1	2–2	1–2	1–0	1–3	3–1	4–3
Brighton & Hove Albion	6–2	3–4	3–2		0–0	2–3	1–0	3–2	1–3	1–2	2–0	3–1	3–1	2–1	2–2	1–1	1–2	2–1	2–2	3–2	3–1	3–1
Bristol City	1–0	5–0	3–0	1–0		0–0	4–0	1–0	1–0	4–0	5–1	2–1	1–1	1–2	1–1	0–1	2–1	3–1	0–1	1–4	5–1	1–0
Bristol Rovers	0–3	7–2	1–2	4–0	0–1		4–1	3–1	0–1	2–0	2–2	0–0	0–1	2–2	1–2	2–2	2–3	5–0	4–2	2–0	1–2	2–1
Charlton Athletic	1–0	5–0	0–2	1–1	3–1	0–1		1–1	1–0	1–0	2–1	0–0	1–4	0–0	3–3	3–0	0–5	1–1	1–2	5–0	2–0	1–1
Crystal Palace	0–1	3–1	2–0	2–1	5–2	0–2	4–1		3–2	0–2	3–0	3–0	1–2	4–2	1–0	2–0	5–5	1–0	3–0	3–0	1–0	4–0
Exeter City	4–0	0–1	6–1	2–4	1–1	3–0	5–3	0–1		2–1	2–2	6–2	3–1	2–1	1–0	0–1	4–0	3–0	3–2	0–1	1–2	6–1
Gillingham	0–1	1–2	1–3	3–1	0–1	6–3	0–0	1–1	2–0		2–1	3–1	0–0	2–0	1–1	2–0	2–0	3–0	4–1	3–1	0–1	0–1
Luton Town	2–1	4–1	4–2	3–3	4–1	1–0	1–0	3–2	1–1	5–3		4–0	2–2	4–2	3–2	3–2	1–1	4–0	0–1	2–0	4–1	5–0
Merthyr Town	1–1	0–2	6–0	0–1	3–2	2–3	0–1	4–0	3–1	0–0	2–1		0–2	4–1	5–3	3–1	1–1	1–0	5–2	5–1	2–1	4–1
Millwall	4–2	0–1	2–1	2–0	3–0	0–0	1–1	1–0	3–0	0–0	7–0	1–1		3–3	4–1	3–1	0–0	3–0	1–0	8–1	3–0	3–0
Newport County	0–0	1–2	2–3	4–3	1–0	3–1	0–0	2–3	3–0	4–0	2–1	3–1	1–0		3–0	1–1	0–3	4–1	1–1	1–0	0–4	3–3
Northampton Town	3–2	1–1	6–1	1–2	1–2	2–0	2–1	4–0	2–1	1–2	0–1	4–1	3–1	2–0		3–2	2–1	3–2	0–1	3–3	2–0	2–2
Norwich City	2–3	3–1	1–0	1–2	1–3	1–0	3–0	4–3	3–1	1–0	2–0	2–2	1–0	0–0	2–1		0–3	1–1	3–1	1–2	2–2	1–1
Plymouth Argyle	7–2	7–2	4–0	5–3	3–1	1–2	1–0	6–2	2–2	2–1	4–3	3–0	2–0	3–0	2–4	6–3		3–1	1–3	6–2	1–1	2–1
Queens Park Rangers	1–3	2–2	1–1	0–2	0–2	2–1	2–2	1–3	0–0	0–1	1–0	1–1	3–0	0–2	3–2	0–1	0–4		1–2	2–2	1–1	2–0
Reading	2–1	5–2	7–1	0–0	1–1	3–0	1–1	2–1	3–2	1–0	3–0	1–1	2–0	2–1	4–2	2–0	1–1	2–1		1–0	2–0	4–1
Southend	0–1	3–0	3–1	4–0	1–2	3–1	1–2	5–1	3–1	1–1	2–0	5–1	0–2	4–1	6–1	0–1	2–0	2–1	2–2		3–0	0–1
Swindon Town	2–1	8–2	2–1	1–0	1–3	4–2	3–0	3–1	2–1	1–0	2–0	0–2	1–1	2–1	1–2	3–1	2–0	2–0	1–1	2–0		5–3
Watford	2–0	0–0	2–2	3–3	2–2	2–1	1–1	3–0	3–1	3–1	2–0	6–1	0–1	5–1	3–2	3–1	0–1	3–1	0–1	1–4	3–2	

Updated to match(es) played on unknown. Source: Ian Laschke: Rothmans Book of Football League Records 1888–89 to 1978–79. Macdonald and Jane’s, London & Sydney, 1980.
Legend: Blue = home team win; Yellow = draw; Red = away team win.

=== Maps ===
Locations of the Football League Third Division South London teams
Locations of the Football League Third Division South teams

== Attendances ==
=== First Division ===
#	Football club	Home games	Average attendance
1	Manchester City	21	31,614
2	Arsenal FC	21	31,471
3	Newcastle United	21	29,957
4	Tottenham Hotspur	21	27,806
5	Manchester United	21	27,647
6	Liverpool FC	21	27,240
7	Everton FC	21	26,876
8	Aston Villa	21	26,496
9	Leicester City	21	24,692
10	Sunderland AFC	21	21,399
11	Leeds United	21	21,382
12	Bolton Wanderers	21	20,437
13	West Ham United	21	20,040
14	Huddersfield Town	21	19,569
15	Sheffield United	21	19,149
16	Birmingham City	21	19,075
17	West Bromwich Albion	21	17,968
18	Cardiff City	21	17,946
19	Burnley FC	21	17,857
20	Blackburn Rovers	21	17,775
21	Bury FC	21	15,728
22	Notts County	21	14,908

=== Second Division ===
#	Football club	Home games	Average attendance
1	Chelsea FC	21	32,355
2	The Wednesday	21	23,661
3	Fulham FC	21	16,594
4	Derby County	21	16,314
5	Swansea Town	21	16,118
6	Preston North End	21	14,705
7	Portsmouth FC	21	14,457
8	Wolverhampton Wanderers	21	14,322
9	Middlesbrough FC	21	13,259
10	Clapton Orient	21	12,757
11	Stoke City	21	12,144
12	Oldham Athletic	21	11,959
13	Bradford City	21	11,833
14	Port Vale	21	10,747
15	Blackpool FC	21	10,606
16	Southampton FC	21	9,965
17	Darlington FC	21	9,052
18	Nottingham Forest	21	8,966
19	Hull City	21	8,380
20	Stockport County	21	8,086
21	Barnsley FC	21	8,044
22	South Shields	21	7,325

== See also ==
- 1925–26 in English football
- 1925 in association football
- 1926 in association football
