= John Van Alphen =

Belgian footballer

Personal information
- Full name: Jan van Alphen
- Date of birth: 17 June 1914
- Place of birth: Antwerp, Belgium
- Date of death: 19 December 1961 (aged 47)
- Height: 1.69 m (5 ft 7 in)
- Positions: Defender; midfielder

Senior career*
Years	Team	Apps	(Gls)
1936–1946	Beerschot VAC		

International career
1938–1944	Belgium	11	(0)

Managerial career
- 1960–1961: KSV Waregem
- * Club domestic league appearances and goals

Jan "John" van Alphen (17 June 1914 – 19 December 1961) was a Belgian footballer, born in Antwerp, Belgium.

He played as a midfielder for Beerschot VAC. With the anversois, he twice won the Belgian Championship, in 1938 and 1939. He played for the Diables Rouges from 1938 to 1944, with whom he played eleven games, including one at the 1938 World Cup.

== Honours ==
- International from 1938 to 1944 (11 caps)
- First international match: Belgium-Netherlands, 1-1, 3 April 1938
- Participation in the 1938 World Cup (Played one match)
- Belgian Champion in 1938 and 1939 with Beerschot VAC
- Belgian Vice-Champion in 1937 with Beerschot VAC
