= 1925 in association football =

The following are the football (soccer) events of the year 1925 throughout the world.

== Winners club national championship ==
- Belgium: Germinal Beerschot
- Denmark: Kjøbenhavns Boldklub
- England: Huddersfield Town
- Germany: 1. FC Nürnberg
- Greece: Regional Championships :EPSA (Athens) Panathinaikos, EPSP (Piraeus)Olympiacos, EPSP (Patras) Panachaiki
- Hungary: MTK Hungária
- Iceland: Fram
- Italy: Bologna F.C. 1909
- Paraguay: Olimpia Asunción
- Poland: Pogoń Lwów
- Scotland: For fuller coverage, see 1924–25 in Scottish football.
  - Scottish Division One – Rangers
  - Scottish Division Two – Dundee United
  - Scottish Cup – Celtic

== International tournaments ==
- 1925 British Home Championship (October 22, 1924 – April 18, 1925)

Scotland

- 1924-28 Nordic Football Championship (June 15, 1924 – October 7, 1928) 1925: (June 14 – August 23, 1925)

Denmark (1925)
Denmark (1924–1928)

- South American Championship 1925 in Argentina (November 29, 1925 – December 25, 1925)

Argentina

== Births ==
- 17 February: Erich Retter; German international footballer (died 2014)
- 28 February: Josef Röhrig, German international footballer (died 2014)
- 22 April: Sebastião Silva, Portuguese former footballer
- 4 May: Jenő Buzánszky, Hungarian international footballer (died 2015)
- 5 May: Željko Čajkovski, Croatian international footballer and coach (died 2016)
- 11 May: Max Morlock, German international footballer (died 1994)
- 16 May: Nílton Santos, Brazilian international footballer (died 2013)
- 5 June: Terry McNee, English professional footballer (died 1999)
- 23 June: Len Rowland, English footballer (died 2014)
- 17 July: James Rønvang, Danish amateur footballer (died 2001)
- July 25: Juan Alberto Schiaffino, Uruguayan international footballer (died 2002)
- August 6: Matías González, Uruguayan international footballer (died 1984)
