= Eric Johnston (disambiguation) =

Eric Johnston (1896–1963) was an American business owner.

Eric Johnston may also refer to:

- Eric Johnston (NT Administrator) (1933–1997), Royal Australian Navy officer and administrator of the Northern Territory
- Eric Johnston (water polo) (1914–2005), Australian water polo player
- Eric Johnston (engineer), a software engineer who created Eric's Pixel Expansion (EPX) and developed Ben's Game

== See also ==
- Eric Johnstone (born 1943), footballer
- Eric Johnson (disambiguation)
- Eric St Johnston (1911–1986), Chief Inspector of Constabulary, UK
