= 1928 in association football =

The following are the football (soccer) events of the year 1928 throughout the world.

== Events ==
- February 10 – La Liga, a top class league of Spain, was official founded.
- 29 August – Honduran club C.D. Motagua was established.

== Winners club national championship ==
- Argentina: Huracán
- Belgium: R. Antwerp F.C.
- Canada: Westminster Royals
- Denmark: B93
- England: Everton F.C.
- Greece: Aris Thessaloniki F.C.
- Iceland: KR
- Italy: Torino F.C.
- Kingdom of Serbs, Croats and Slovenes: Građanski Zagreb
- Netherlands: Feyenoord Rotterdam
- Paraguay: Olimpia Asunción
- Poland: Wisła Kraków
- Scotland:
  - Division One: Rangers F.C.
  - Scottish Cup: Rangers F.C.

== International tournaments ==
- 1928 British Home Championship (October 22, 1927 – March 31, 1928)

Wales

- Olympic Games in Amsterdam, Netherlands (May 27 – June 13, 1928)
  1. Uruguay
  2. Argentina
  3. Italy
- Baltic Cup 1928 in Estonia (July 25–27, 1928)

Latvia

- 1924-28 Nordic Football Championship (June 15, 1924 – October 7, 1928) 1928: (June 7 - October 7, 1928)

Denmark (1928)
Denmark (1924-1928)

== Births ==
- January 13 – Bengt Gustavsson, Swedish international footballer and manager (died 2017)
- January 13 – William Martínez, Uruguayan international footballer (died 1997)
- January 25 – Cor van der Hart, Dutch international footballer (died 2006)
- February 23 – André Strappe, French international footballer (died 2006)
- February 29 – Gustau Biosca, Spanish international footballer and manager (died 2014)
- March 12 – Gerhard Harpers, German international footballer (died 2016)
- March 19 – Åke Johansson, Swedish international footballer (died 2014)
- May 29 – Harald Hennum, Norwegian international footballer (died 1993)
- June 16 – Bobby Craig, English professional footballer (died 2016)
- July 1 – Karim Allawi Homaidi, Iraqi footballer
- July 11 – Marcos Calderón, Peruvian football coach (died 1987)
- July 22 – Jimmy Hill, English footballer and broadcaster (died 2015)
- July 25 – Jimmy Jones, Northern Irish international footballer (died 2014)
- August 14 – Gunnar Andersson, Swedish-born French club player (died 1969)
- September 9 – Fritz Herkenrath, German international goalkeeper (died 2016)
- September 23 – Santiago Vernazza, Argentine footballer (died 2017)
- September 29 – Mihály Lantos, Hungarian international footballer and manager (died 1989)
- October 1: Eddie Grant, Scottish professional footballer (died 1979)
- October 8: Didi, Brazilian international footballer (died 2001)
- October 19 – Mustapha Zitouni, French-Algerian international footballer (died 2014)
- October 28 – Lawrie Reilly, Scottish international footballer (died 2014)
- October 30 – Raúl Cárdenas, Mexican international footballer (died 2016)
- November 7 – Harry Hetherington, English professional footballer (died 1987)
- November 26 – Károly Sándor, Hungarian international footballer (died 2014)
