= 1926 in association football =

The following are the football (soccer) events of the year 1926 throughout the world.

== Events ==
PAOK FC was founded in Thessaloniki, Greece. SC Lourinhanense was founded in Lisbon, Portugal.

- November 8 – APOEL FC is founded in Cyprus.

== Winners club national championship ==
- Denmark: B1903
- England: Huddersfield Town
- Greece: Regional Championships:

EPSA (Athens) Panathinaikos
EPSP (Pireas)Olympiacos
EPSM (Thessaloniki) Aris
EPSP (Patras) A.P.S. Olympiakos Patras

- Iceland: KR
- Ireland: Shelbourne
- Italy: Juventus
- Kingdom of Serbs, Croats and Slovenes: Građanski Zagreb
- Netherlands: SC Enschede
- Poland: Pogoń Lwów
- Scotland:
  - Division One: Celtic F.C.
  - Scottish Cup: St. Mirren F.C.

== International tournaments ==
- 1926 British Home Championship (October 24, 1925 – April 17, 1926)

Scotland

- 1924-28 Nordic Football Championship (June 15, 1924 – October 7, 1928) 1926: (June 9 - October 3, 1926)

Denmark (1926)
Denmark (1924-1928)

- South American Championship 1926 in Chile (October 12, 1926 – November 3, 1926)

Uruguay

== Births ==
- January 22 – Otto Hemele, Czech international footballer (died 2001)
- February 4 – Gyula Grosics, Hungarian international football player and manager (died 2014)
- May 1 – Doug Cowie, Scottish international footballer (died 2021)
- May 5 – Víctor Ugarte, Bolivian international footballer (died 1995)
- May 27 – Kees Rijvers, Dutch football player and manager (died 2024)
- June 2 – Pat Hewson, English former footballer (died 2017)
- June 19 – Juan Hohberg, Uruguayan international footballer (died 1996)
- June 19 – Julio Pérez, Uruguayan international footballer (died 2002)
- July 4 – Alfredo Di Stéfano, Argentine-Spanish international footballer and coach (died 2014)
- September 29 – Harry Hart, English professional footballer (died 2012)
- December 19 – René Pascucci, Luxembourgian footballer (died 2018)
- December 22 – Alcides Ghiggia, Uruguayan international footballer (died 2015)

== Clubs founded ==
- APOEL FC
- ACF Fiorentina
- SSC Napoli
- PAOK FC
- Real Oviedo
