= Henry Hart =

Henry Hart may refer to:

== Military men ==
- Henry Hart (soldier) (1566–1637), Anglo-Irish landowner in Donegal
- Henry Hart (Royal Navy officer) (1781–1856), British diplomat in Zanzibar
- Henry George Hart (1808–1878), British Army officer and founding author of Hart's Army List

== Writers ==
- Henry Chichester Hart (1847–1908), Anglo-Irish botanist and explorer
- Henry M. Hart Jr. (1904–1969), American legal scholar at Harvard
- Henry Hart (author) (born 1954), American poet, historian and academic

== Others ==
- Henry Hart (died c. 1578) (1531–1578), English MP for Old Sarum in 1559
- Henry Hart (musician) (1839–1915), African-American composer, singer and violinist from Indiana

== Characters ==
- Henry Hart / Kid Danger, 13-year-old American boy among Characters of Henry Danger and Danger Force in 2014

== See also ==
- Henry Hert, English MP for Melcombe Regis in 1388
- Henry Hickman Harte (1790–1848), Irish mathematician
- Harry Hart (disambiguation)
