= 1944 in association football =

The following are the football (soccer) events of the year 1944 throughout the world.

== Winners club national championship ==
- Argentina: Boca Juniors
- Austria: First Vienna
- Belgium: R. Antwerp F.C.
- Czechoslovakia: Sparta Prague
- Denmark: Boldklubben Frem
- Finland: VIFK Vaasa
- Germany: Dresdner SC
- Iceland: Valur
- Ireland: Shelbourne
- Israel: Hapoel Tel Aviv
- Italy: Spezia Calcio
- Mexico: Real Club España
- Portugal: Sporting Clube de Portugal
- Romania: Nagyváradi AC
- Peru: Sucre FC
- Scotland:
  - Scottish Cup: No competition
- Spain: Valencia CF
- Sweden: Malmö FF
- Switzerland: Lausanne Sports
- Turkey: Fenerbahçe

== Births ==
- March 15 – Gérard Farison, French international footballer (died 2021)
- April 4 – Ronnie Rees, Welsh international footballer
- April 15 – Kunishige Kamamoto, Japanese international footballer
- May 6 – Hugo Bravo, Chilean footballer (died 2020)
- June 28 – Georgi Hristakiev, Bulgarian international footballer (died 2016)
- July 7 – Jürgen Grabowski, German international footballer (died 2022)
- July 14 – Juan Carlos Touriño, Spanish international footballer (died 2017)
- July 17 – Carlos Alberto Torres, Brazilian international footballer (died 2016)
- August 23 – Augustin Deleanu, Romanian international footballer (died 2014)
- September 11 – Alan Bermingham, English former professional footballer (died 1944)
- September 30 – Jimmy Johnstone, Scottish international footballer (died 2006)
- November 9 – Herbert Wimmer, German international footballer
- December 16 – Eric Johnson, English former professional footballer
- December 17 – Ferenc Bene, Hungarian international footballer (died 2006)
- December 25 – Jairzinho, Brazilian international footballer

== Deaths ==
- January 31 – Árpád Weisz (47), Hungarian footballer (born 1896)
- April 11 – Alejandro Villanueva (35), Peruvian footballer (born 1908)
- July 18 – Wim Anderiesen (40), Dutch footballer (born 1903)
