= Erik Johnson (disambiguation) =

Erik Johnson is an American former ice hockey player.

Erik Johnson may also refer to:

- Erik Johnson (infielder) (born 1965), baseball player
- Erik Johnson (pitcher) (born 1989), baseball player
- Erik Johnsen (born 1965), Norwegian ski jumper
- J. Erik Jonsson (1901–1995), businessman and mayor of Dallas

== See also ==
- Eric Johnson (disambiguation)
