= M. Eric Johnson =

M. Eric Johnson is Dean (emeritus) and the Bruce D. Henderson Professor at Vanderbilt University’s Owen Graduate School of Management Owen Graduate School of Management, Vanderbilt University. At Vanderbilt, he served two terms as the Ralph Owen Dean, advancing the school through faculty and infrastructure development while enhancing its academic reputation as reflected in key business school rankings. Formerly, he was Associate Dean and the Benjamin Ames Kimball Professor at the Tuck School of Business at Dartmouth College in Hanover, New Hampshire, United States. He was also Director of the Glassmeyer/McNamee Center for Digital Strategies. Prior to Tuck, he was a professor of management at Vanderbilt University and a development engineer at Hewlett-Packard.

His teaching and research focus on digital strategies and the impact of information technology on the extended enterprise. He is currently focused on the role of information technology to improve healthcare. He has authored patents on interface design and has testified before the U.S. Congress on information risk. In addition to his academic research, Johnson has consulted with global companies such as Accenture, Hewlett-Packard, Nike, Oracle, and Philips Healthcare. His writing and expert commentary have been featured in global media outlets, including the Financial Times, Wall Street Journal, New York Times, and Bloomberg News. His book, The Economics of Financial and Medical Identity Theft (2012) exposes the information security challenges in US Healthcare. He also edited the book, Managing Information Risk and the Economics of Security (Springer 2009), which examines how organizations can protect their information assets. He has published many related articles in the Wall Street Journal, Financial Times, Sloan Management Review, Harvard Business Review, and CIO Magazine.

His achievements include the Dean's Award for Teaching Excellence, Owen Graduate School of Management, Vanderbilt University, 1995, 1997; winner, CIBER/POMS international case competition, 2000; Accenture Award for outstanding research paper in logistics, 2001. Research funding: Departments of Homeland Security and Justice, 2005– present; U.S. Bureau of Justice, 2005–07; National Institute of Standards and Technology, 2006–07; National Science Foundtation, 2009-2020.

He is president of POMS (2025-2027) and a department editor for the academic journal - Production and Operations Management. He serves on the editorial boards of several journals and the boards of both for-profit and nonprofit organizations. Johnson received his undergraduate and master's degrees from Pennsylvania State University and his doctorate from Stanford University.
