= Eric Johnstone =

English footballer (born 1943)

Personal information
- Full name: Eric Johnstone
- Date of birth: 22 March 1943 (age 83)
- Place of birth: Newcastle upon Tyne, England
- Position: Winger

Senior career*
Years	Team	Apps	(Gls)
19??–1963	Tow Law Town		
1963–1965	Carlisle United	15	(3)
1965–1966/7	Darlington	26	(9)
1966/7–1970	South Shields (1936)		
1970–197?	Gateshead		
- Marine Park
1974–197?	South Shields (1974)		
- * Club domestic league appearances and goals

Eric Johnstone (born 22 March 1943) is an English former footballer who scored 12 goals from 41 appearances in the Football League playing as a winger for Carlisle United and Darlington in the 1960s. He also played non-league football for clubs including Tow Law Town, South Shields (1936), Gateshead, Marine Park and South Shields (1974).

== Life and career ==
Johnstone was born in Newcastle upon Tyne in 1943. He played football for Northern League club Tow Law Town, scored twice in a 7–0 defeat of Shildon in the last match of the 1962–63 season, and signed for Carlisle United of the Football League Fourth Division in June. Johnstone came into the first team for the League Cup match against Crewe Alexandra on 4 September 1963, scored in the 3–2 win, and kept his place to make his Football League debut three days later. He started the following three league matches, scoring once more, but did not appear again until February 1964. Carlisle finished as runners-up so were promoted to the Third Division for the 1964–65 season. Johnstone had three goals from 13 matches by the end of October, but lost his place. Fourth Division club Darlington's initial attempts to sign Johnstone in December broke down, but at the end of the season, after he took no further part in Carlisle's second successive promotion, the move took place.

Johnstone made his debut on 23 August 1965, 78 minutes into a 2–0 defeat at Lincoln City, replacing Les O'Neill who had twisted a knee. He thus became Darlington's first substitute since their use was permitted at the start of the season. He was a member of the Darlington team that beat a Blackpool team containing four England internationals, including full-back Jimmy Armfield, in the third round of the 1965–66 League Cup away from home. According to the Journal, he "had particularly bad luck with two drives, one of which hit the bar from 25 yards (23 m) and the other England international goalkeeper Tony Waiters did well to palm away". He had better luck with a third: after it "hammered the crossbar", Bill Hopper equalised from the rebound, before George McGeachie's goal eliminated the First Division side. The next day's report in the Northern Echo told how Johnstone had "time and again led Armfield a merry dance". He scored his first goal for Darlington on 25 September, and had seven by the end of October. Although his goalscoring dried up, he finished with nine goals from 25 appearances as Lol Morgan led Darlington to runners-up spot in the 1965–66 Fourth Division, which gave them their first promotion since the 1920s. Morgan was replaced over the close season by Jimmy Greenhalgh, and Johnstone played in the first two matches of the following season before himself leaving the club.

Johnstone returned to non-league football with South Shields of the North Regional League, who became founder members of the Northern Premier League in 1968. He was a member of the Shields side that eliminated two Football League opponents – Bradford Park Avenue and Oldham Athletic, for which he was marked by 1966 World Cup-winner Ray Wilson – to reach the third round of the 1969–70 FA Cup, in which they faced a Queens Park Rangers side including the likes of Rodney Marsh and Terry Venables. South Shields lost 4–1, ended the match with only nine men because of injuries, and four players received hospital treatment afterwards. He refused to re-sign for another season because he thought the terms offered were inadequate, and joined Gateshead of the Wearside League. In September 1972, Johnstone was playing for Northern Alliance club Marine Park, and in the 1974–75 season he was on the books of the new South Shields club, formed when the previous incarnation moved to Gateshead.

Outside football, Johnstone worked for engineering companies and for the Department of Social Security.

== Sources ==
- Tweddle, Frank (2000). The Definitive Darlington F.C. Nottingham: Soccerdata. ISBN 978-1-899468-15-7.
