= Len Rowland =

English footballer

Personal information
- Full name: Leonard Charles Rowland
- Date of birth: 23 June 1925
- Place of birth: Manchester, England
- Date of death: 2014 (aged 88–89)
- Place of death: Stockport, England
- Position: Left-back

Senior career*
| Years | Team | Apps | (Gls) |
- Mansfield Town
| 1949–1951 | Wrexham | 18 | (0) |
| 1951–1952 | Ashton United | | |
| 1952–1957 | Stockport County | 61 | (0) |
- Winsford United
| | Mossley | 16 | (0) |

International career
| | England Amateur | 6 | (0) |
- * Club domestic league appearances and goals

Leonard Charles Rowland (23 June 1925 – May 2014) was an English footballer who played as a left-back. He played in the English football league for Wrexham and Stockport County.

He later played for Winsford United before signing for Mossley in the 1960–61 season.

He also won 6 caps for the England national amateur football team.
