= Roy Thurnham =

English footballer

Personal information
- Full name: Roy Thomas Thurnham
- Date of birth: 17 December 1942 (age 83)
- Place of birth: Macclesfield, Cheshire, England
- Position: Defender

Youth career
- Manchester City

Senior career*
Years	Team	Apps	(Gls)
	Manchester City	0	(0)
1962–1963	Wrexham	2	(0)
- George Cross
- * Club domestic league appearances and goals

Roy Thomas Thurnham (born 17 December 1942) is an English former professional footballer who played as a defender. He made appearances in the English Football League for Wrexham.
