= Nobby Upton =

English footballer

Personal information
- Full name: Robin Patrick Upton
- Date of birth: 9 November 1942 (age 83)
- Place of birth: Lincoln, England
- Height: 5 ft 10 in (1.78 m)
- Positions: Wing half; centre half

Youth career
- 195?–1959: Brighton & Hove Albion

Senior career*
Years	Team	Apps	(Gls)
1959–1966	Brighton & Hove Albion	40	(0)
1966–196?	Crawley Town	8	(0)
1968–1969	Durban United		
1969–197?	East London Celtic		
- * Club domestic league appearances and goals

Robin Patrick Upton (born 9 November 1942), commonly known as Nobby Upton, is an English former professional footballer who played as a wing half or centre half in the Football League for Brighton & Hove Albion.

== Life and career ==
Upton was born in 1942 in Lincoln, Lincolnshire, where he attended the local grammar school. Against the advice of his teachers, he joined Brighton & Hove Albion as a 15-year-old, and turned professional on his 17th birthday. Beginning his career as a wing half, he made his debut in November 1962, and played twice more before a knee cartilage operation kept him out for the rest of the season. He played regularly at centre half the following season, broke his leg in late 1964, broke it again ahead of the 1965–66 campaign, and played just twice more for Brighton. He moved on to Crawley Town in September 1966, and tried his luck in South African football in 1968 with Durban United and then East London Celtic. He quit football after injuring knee cartilage in the first minute of a trial with AFC Bournemouth, and then worked for a bakery, ran a mobile grocery business, and worked on the railway as ticket inspector and train manager.
