= Eddie Grant (footballer) =

Scottish footballer

Personal information
- Full name: Edward Anthony Grant
- Date of birth: 1 October 1928
- Place of birth: Greenock, Scotland
- Date of death: 30 June 1979 (aged 50)
- Place of death: Greenock, Scotland
- Height: 6 ft 0 in (1.83 m)
- Position: Inside forward

Senior career*
Years	Team	Apps	(Gls)
1947–1949	Hibernian	0	(0)
1949–1950	Weymouth		
1950–1951	Sheffield United	4	(0)
1951–1952	Kilmarnock	2	(0)
1952–1954	Grimsby Town	15	(5)
1954–195?	Corby Town		
Total		21	(5)
- * Club domestic league appearances and goals

Edward Anthony Grant (1 October 1928 – 30 June 1979) was a Scottish professional footballer who played as an inside forward.
