= Bernard Bonner =

Scottish footballer (1927–2005)

Personal information
- Full name: Bernard Bonner
- Date of birth: 22 July 1927
- Place of birth: Motherwell, Scotland
- Date of death: 14 February 2005 (aged 77)
- Place of death: East Kilbride, Lanarkshire, Scotland
- Position: Forward

Senior career*
Years	Team	Apps	(Gls)
- Stonehouse Violet
1949–1951	Dunfermline Athletic	12	(5)
1951–1952	Airdrieonians		
1952	Wrexham	1	(0)
- Blantyre Celtic
- * Club domestic league appearances and goals

Bernard Bonner (22 July 1927 – 14 February 2005) was a Scottish professional footballer who played as a forward. Spending most of his playing career in Scotland, he made an appearance in the English Football League with Wrexham.
