= Frank Bee =

English footballer

Personal information
- Full name: Francis Eric Bee
- Date of birth: 23 January 1927
- Place of birth: Nottingham, England
- Date of death: 2010 (aged 82–83)
- Position: Inside forward

Youth career
- Nottingham Forest

Senior career*
Years	Team	Apps	(Gls)
1947–1949	Sunderland	5	(1)
1949–1950	Blackburn Rovers	4	(0)
- * Club domestic league appearances and goals

Francis Eric Bee (23 January 1927 – 2010) was an English professional footballer who played as an inside forward for Sunderland.
