= Stewart McCallum =

Scottish footballer (1927–2008)

Personal information
- Date of birth: 9 May 1927
- Place of birth: Bearsden, Scotland
- Date of death: December 2008 (aged 81)
- Place of death: Bodelwyddan, Wales
- Position: Wing-half

Senior career*
Years	Team	Apps	(Gls)
- Rhyl
1950–1953	Wrexham	67	(0)
1953–1954	Kettering Town		
1954–1956	Workington	10	(1)
1956	Coventry City	0	(0)
1956–1957	Hartlepool United	2	(0)
1957–1958	Southport	9	(0)
- Holyhead Town
- * Club domestic league appearances and goals

Stewart McCallum (9 May 1927 – December 2008) was a Scottish footballer who made English football league appearances with Wrexham, Workington, Hartlepool United and Southport.

== Career ==
Starting out at Welsh club Rhyl, McCallum signed for Wrexham in 1950. He stayed there until 1953 before moving to non-league Kettering Town.

McCallum would return to the English football league with Workington, however he would only make 10 appearances before moving to Coventry City, where he did not make a single league appearance.

After short stints at Hartlepool United and Southport, McCallum would move back to the Welsh league with Holyhead Town
