= Derek Jackman =

English footballer

Personal information
- Full name: Derek Clive Jackman
- Date of birth: 20 August 1927
- Place of birth: Colchester, England
- Date of death: 21 November 2017 (aged 90)
- Place of death: Essex, England
- Position: Wing half

Senior career*
Years	Team	Apps	(Gls)
- Chelmsford City
1945–1948	Crystal Palace	0	(0)
1948–1951	West Ham United	8	(0)
1951–1956	Chelmsford City		
- * Club domestic league appearances and goals

Derek Clive Jackman (20 August 1927 — 21 November 2017) was an English footballer who played as a wing half.

== Career ==
Born in Colchester, Jackman began his career with Essex club Chelmsford City. In 1945, Jackman signed for Crystal Palace. During his time at the club, Jackman failed to make a senior appearance.

On 11 August 1948, Jackman joined Second Division club West Ham United. On 21 August 1948, Jackman made a goalscoring debut for West Ham 'A' in an Eastern Counties League fixture away to Harwich & Parkeston. Two days later, Jackman moved up to West Ham's reserve side, making another goalscoring debut in a 4–1 victory against Ipswich Town reserves. On 5 March 1949, after becoming a regular for the reserves, Jackman made his Football League debut for the club in a 2–1 win against Blackburn Rovers at the Boleyn Ground. Jackman would go on to make seven more league appearances for West Ham, before re-signing for Chelmsford City in July 1951 for £1,000.
