= René Pascucci =

Luxembourgish footballer (1926–2018)

Personal information
- Date of birth: 19 December 1926
- Date of death: 9 March 2018 (aged 91)

International career
| Years | Team | Apps | (Gls) |
| 1951–1960 | Luxembourg | 15 | (0) |

René Pascucci (19 December 1926 – 9 March 2018) was a Luxembourgish footballer. He played in 15 matches for the Luxembourg national football team from 1951 to 1960.
