= Sebastião Silva =

Portuguese footballer (born 1925)

Sebastião
Personal information
- Full name: Sebastião Loureiro da Silva
- Date of birth: 22 April 1925
- Place of birth: Portugal
- Position: Goalkeeper

Senior career*
Years	Team	Apps	(Gls)
- G.D. Estoril-Praiabenfica e vitoria de guimaraes

International career
1952	Portugal	1	(0)
- * Club domestic league appearances and goals

Sebastião Loureiro da Silva (born 22 April 1925) is a Portuguese former footballer who played as goalkeeper.

== See also ==
- Football in Portugal
- List of football clubs in Portugal
