= Alan Bermingham =

English footballer

Personal information
- Full name: Alan Bermingham
- Date of birth: 11 September 1944 (age 82)
- Place of birth: Liverpool, England
- Position: Full-back

Senior career*
Years	Team	Apps	(Gls)
- Skelmersdale United
1967–1971	Wrexham	116	(2)
- Durban City
- * Club domestic league appearances and goals

Alan Bermingham (born 11 September 1944) is an English former professional footballer who played as a full-back. He made over 100 appearances for Wrexham in the English Football League. He also played for Durban City in South Africa.
