= 1941 in association football =

The following are the football (soccer) events of the year 1941 throughout the world.

== Events ==
- January 19 – FK Austria Wien defeat LASK Linz 21–0 in the Gauliga Ostmark (Austrian First Division).
- June 24 – The USSR First Division championship is abandoned after the German invasion of the USSR.
- Alajuelense win the Costa Rican First Division with a 100% record – played 6, won 6, drew 0, lost 0.
- Nacional win the Uruguayan First Division with a 100% record – played 20, won 20, drew 0, lost 0.
- Two matches are not played in the final round of the Chilean First Division. They are Colo-Colo versus Badminton FC, and Unión Española versus Green Cross.

== Winners club national championship ==
- Argentina: River Plate
- Austria (Gauliga Ostmark) and Germany: Rapid Vienna
- Chile: Colo-Colo
- Costa Rica: Alajuelense
- Croatia: Hajduk Split
- Iceland: KR
- Italy: Bologna
- Mexico: Atlante
- Scotland:
  - Scottish Cup: No competition
- Spain: Atlético Aviación (Atlético Madrid in Post-War)
- Switzerland: Lugano
- Romania: Unirea Tricolor București
- Turkey: Gençlerbirliği
- Uruguay: Nacional

== Births ==
- January 11
  - Gérson, Brazilian international footballer
  - Pak Seung-zin, North Korean footballer (died 2011)
- January 20 – Allan Young, English club footballer (died 2009)
- January 28 – Fernando Serena, Spanish footballer (d. 2018)
- February 1 – Teofil Codreanu, Romanian international footballer (died 2016)
- March 2 – Bert Jacobs, Dutch footballer and manager (died 1999)
- April 12 – Bobby Moore, English international footballer. England captain and World cup winner (died 1993)
- May 21 – Anton Pronk, Dutch international footballer (died 2016)
- June 2 – Dinko Dermendzhiev, Bulgarian footballer and manager (died 2019)
- July 8 – Dario Gradi, Italian amateur football player, coach and manager known for his association with English club Crewe Alexandra
- July 10 – Henk Bosveld, Dutch footballer (died 1998)
- July 22 – Harry Bähre, German footballer
- July 26 – Hans Dorjee, Dutch footballer and manager (died 2002)
- August 2 – Jean Cornelis, Belgian international footballer (died 2016)
- August 20 – Marian Szeja, Polish international footballer (died 2015)
- August 24 – Jean Plaskie, Belgian international footballer (died 2017)
- September 15 – Flórián Albert, Hungarian international footballer (died 2011)
- October 9 – Giancarlo Bercellino, Italian international footballer
- October 28 – David Sloan, Northern Irish international footballer (died 2016)
- November 23 – Alan Mullery, English international footballer and manager
