= Harry Hetherington =

English footballer

Personal information
- Full name: Henry Hetherington
- Date of birth: 7 November 1928
- Place of birth: Chester-le-Street, England
- Date of death: October 1987 (aged 58)
- Place of death: Westhoughton, England
- Position: Winger

Youth career
- Shiney Row St Oswald's

Senior career*
Years	Team	Apps	(Gls)
1946–1949	Sunderland	2	(0)
1949	Gateshead	2	(1)
- * Club domestic league appearances and goals

Henry Hetherington (7 November 1928 – October 1987) was an English professional footballer who played as a winger for Sunderland.
