= Bobby Craig (footballer, born 1928) =

English footballer

Personal information
- Full name: Robert Craig
- Date of birth: 16 June 1928
- Place of birth: Consett, England
- Date of death: 2016 (aged 87–88)
- Position: Full-back

Youth career
- Leadgate Juniors

Senior career*
Years	Team	Apps	(Gls)
1948–1951	Sunderland	1	(0)
1951–1955	Headington United		
1955–19??	Bedford Town		
- * Club domestic league appearances and goals

Robert Craig (16 June 1928 – 2016) was an English professional footballer who played as a full-back for Sunderland.
