= Casimir Koza =

French footballer (1935–2010)

Personal information
- Date of birth: 27 January 1935
- Place of birth: Fouquières-lès-Lens, France
- Date of death: 30 November 2010 (aged 75)
- Height: 1.82 m (6 ft 0 in)
- Position: Forward

Senior career*
| Years | Team | Apps | (Gls) |
- Lens
- Red Star
- Racing Club de France
- Strasbourg
- Limoges FC

International career
| 1962 | France | 1 | (0) |
- * Club domestic league appearances and goals

Casimir Koza (27 January 1935 – 30 November 2010) was a French footballer who played as a forward. He made one appearance for the France national team in 1962.
