= Pat Hewson =

English footballer

Personal information
- Full name: Patrick Carroll Hewson
- Date of birth: 2 June 1926
- Place of birth: Gateshead, England
- Date of death: 28 March 2017 (aged 90)
- Position: Full-back

Senior career*
Years	Team	Apps	(Gls)
1949–1950	Crook Town		
1950–1953	West Bromwich Albion	0	(0)
1953–1958	Gateshead	130	(0)
1958–19??	Craghead		
- * Club domestic league appearances and goals

Patrick Carroll Hewson (2 June 1926 – 28 March 2017) was an English footballer who played as a full-back.

Hewson played in The Football League for Gateshead between 1953 and 1958 after a spell at West Bromwich Albion. He was also on the books at Northern League side Crook Town earlier in his career.

== Sources ==
- "PAT HEWSON". Post War English & Scottish Football League A–Z Player's Transfer Database.
- "Pat Hewson". English National Football Archive.
