= Arthur Wilkie =

English footballer

Personal information
- Full name: Arthur William Wilkie
- Date of birth: 7 October 1942 (age 84)
- Place of birth: Woolwich, England
- Position: Goalkeeper

Youth career
- Reading

Senior career*
Years	Team	Apps	(Gls)
1961–1968	Reading	169	(2)
1968–1970	Chelmsford City	34	(0)
1970–1972	Basingstoke Town		
1972–1973	Cotswold		
- * Club domestic league appearances and goals

Arthur William Wilkie (born 7 October 1942) is an English former footballer who played as a goalkeeper.

== Career ==
Wilkie began his career at Reading, rising up from the youth ranks at the club. In total, Wilkie made 169 Football League for the club. On 31 August 1962, in a match against Halifax Town, Wilkie suffered a back injury. Wilkie was thus utilised as a winger for the rest of the game, scoring twice in a 4–2 win.

Following his time at Reading, Wilkie signed for Chelmsford City. In 1970, Wilkie signed for Basingstoke Town. In 1972, Wilkie signed for Reading Combination League side Cotswold, where he was utilised as a forward. In February 1973, after 22 goals in 15 appearances, Wilkie left Cotswold in order to emigrate to New Zealand.
