= Eric Johnson (theologian) =

American psychologist and academic

Eric L. Johnson is an American psychologist, academic, and pastoral counselor known for his contributions to the development of a distinctly Christian version of psychological science and psychotherapy. He is the founding director of the Society for Christian Psychology and currently serves as the Director of Training at the Christian Psychology Institute.

== Education and career ==
Johnson earned his PhD from Michigan State University. His academic career includes ten years teaching psychology and worldview studies at the University of Northwestern – St. Paul. He later served for 17 years as the Lawrence and Charlotte Hoover Professor of Pastoral Care at the Southern Baptist Theological Seminary (SBTS). He retired from SBTS in 2017 and was subsequently named Senior Research Professor.

From 2018 to 2024, Johnson was Professor of Christian Psychology at Houston Christian University (HCU), where he developed an M.A. in Christian Counseling degree based on a Christian worldview. In May 2024, he retired from HCU to focus on the national expansion of the Christian Psychology Institute.

== Contributions ==
Johnson’s research focuses on three primary areas: the theological and philosophical foundations of psychology, the development of Christian psychology, and "Christian soul care"—a Christ-centered framework encompassing psychotherapy, counseling, and spiritual direction. He argues that while empirical research in modern psychology provides valuable data, it requires reinterpretation through a theological lens because it is often based on secularist and naturalist worldviews.

At the Christian Psychology Institute, his training programs focus on "Christ-centered therapy," which draws primarily from the Christian spiritual direction tradition and inner healing prayer, and is informed by classical Reformational theology and philosophy as well as modern psychology and psychotherapy.

== Selected publications ==
=== Books ===
- Johnson, Eric L. (2007). Foundations for Soul Care: A Christian Psychology Proposal. InterVarsity Press. ISBN 978-0830875276.
- Johnson, Eric L. (2010). Johnson, Eric L. (ed.). Psychology & Christianity: Five Views (2nd ed.). InterVarsity Press. ISBN 978-0830828487.
- Johnson, Eric L. (2017). God and Soul Care: The Therapeutic Resources of the Christian Faith. InterVarsity Press. ISBN 978-0830851836.

=== Articles and chapters ===
- Johnson, Eric L. (1997). "Christ, the Lord of psychology". Journal of Psychology and Theology. 25 (1): 11–27. doi:10.1177/009164719702500102.
- Johnson, Eric L. (2013). "Mapping the field of the whole human: Toward a form psychology". New Ideas in Psychology. 31 (2): 130–150. doi:10.1016/j.newideapsych.2013.05.005.
