= Terry McNee =

English footballer

Personal information
- Full name: Terence Allan McNee
- Date of birth: 5 June 1925
- Place of birth: Birkenhead, England
- Date of death: 1999 (aged 73–74)
- Place of death: Birkenhead, England
- Position: Goalkeeper

Senior career*
Years	Team	Apps	(Gls)
- Park Villa
1946–1947	Wrexham	11	(0)
- Rhyl
- * Club domestic league appearances and goals

Terence Allan McNee (5 June 1925 – October 1999) was an English professional footballer who played as a goalkeeper. He made 11 appearances in the English football league for Wrexham in the 1946–47 season. He also played for Park Villa and Rhyl.
