= Albert Gemmrich =

French footballer (born 1955)

Personal information
- Date of birth: 13 February 1955 (age 71)
- Place of birth: Haguenau, France
- Height: 1.75 m (5 ft 9 in)
- Position: Striker

Youth career
- AS Mutzig

Senior career*
Years	Team	Apps	(Gls)
1973–1979	Strasbourg	197	(86)
1979–1982	Bordeaux	94	(35)
1982–1983	Lille	17	(0)
1983–1984	Strasbourg	30	(8)
1984–1986	Nice	30	(4)

International career
1978	France	5	(2)
- * Club domestic league appearances and goals

Albert Gemmrich (born 13 February 1955) is a French former professional footballer who played as a striker. He obtained five caps scoring twice for the France national team.

== Career statistics ==
Scores and results list France's goal tally first, score column indicates score after each Gemmrich goal.

List of international goals scored by Albert Gemmrich
No.	Date	Venue	Opponent	Score	Result	Competition
1	11 May 1978	Stadium Municipal, Toulouse, France	Iran		2–1	Friendly
2	7 October 1978	Stade Josy Barthel, Luxembourg, Luxembourg	Luxembourg		3–1	UEFA Euro 1980 qualifying

== Honours ==
- French championship in 1979 with RC Strasbourg
