= Harold Hart (cricketer) =

Australian cricketer

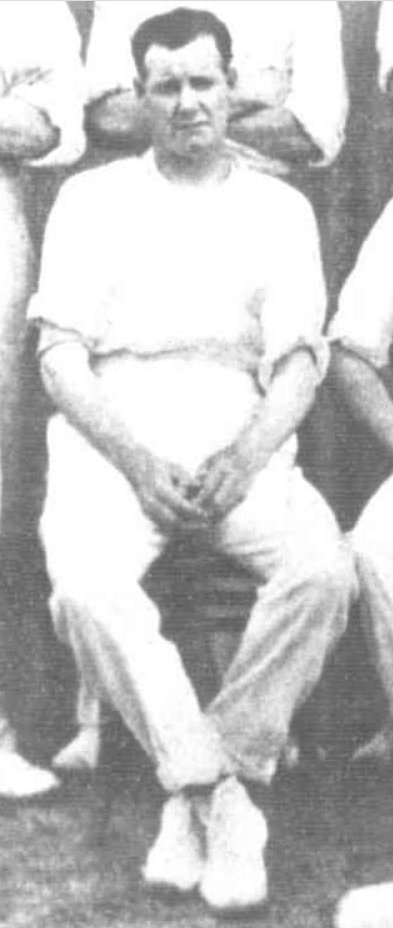

Personal information
- Born: 4 January 1889; Melbourne, Australia
- Died: 2 January 1953 (aged 63); Yarraville, Australia

Domestic team information
- Years: Team
- 1910-1915: Victoria
- Source: Cricinfo, 15 November 2015

Harold Hart (4 January 1889 – 2 January 1953) was an Australian cricketer. He played ten first-class cricket matches for Victoria between 1910 and 1915.

== See also ==
- List of Victoria first-class cricketers
