= Oskar Rohr =

German footballer (1912–1988)

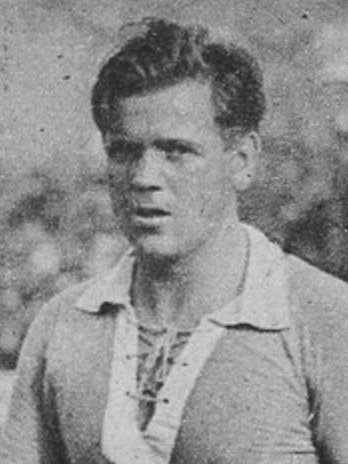
- Rohr in 1937

Personal information
- Date of birth: 24 April 1912
- Place of birth: Mannheim, Germany
- Date of death: 8 November 1988 (aged 76)
- Position: Striker

Senior career*
| Years | Team | Apps | (Gls) |
| 1928–1930 | VfR Mannheim | | |
| 1930–1933 | Bayern Munich | 57 | (57) |
| 1933–1934 | Grasshoppers Zürich | 20 | (23) |
| 1934–1939 | Strasbourg | 136 | (118) |
| 1940–1941 | Sète | | |
| 1945 | Schwaben Augsburg | 15 | (8) |
| 1946 | VfR Mannheim | 7 | (3) |
| 1946–1948 | FK Pirmasens | | |
| 1948–1949 | Waldhof Mannheim | 17 | (5) |
| Total | | 252 | (214) |

International career
| 1932–1933 | Germany | 4 | (5) |
- * Club domestic league appearances and goals

Oskar Rohr (24 April 1912 – 8 November 1988) was a German footballer and one of the first footballers to play abroad in a foreign league. He was born in Mannheim, Germany.

== Early career ==
Rohr, known primarily by his nickname "Ossi", began his career in the 1920s as a striker for hometown clubs FC Phönix Mannheim and later for VfR Mannheim. He was quickly marked as a talented striker with a natural instinct for scoring goals. Fueled by the desire to display his talents at a higher level, he signed with FC Bayern Munich in 1930. In his first season with FC Bayern, Rohr and his teammates barely missed out on the final round of the German Championship. In his second season with the club, FC Bayern went on to defeat Eintracht Frankfurt in the final and claim its first German Championship with a 2–0 victory. Ossi Rohr, who scored one of the two goals in the match against Eintracht, was German Champion at the young age of 20 years. The following year, Bayern's fortunes were significantly poorer, resulting in a mid-table finish within Bavaria. This lackluster finish encouraged Rohr to continue his career elsewhere.

At the age of 19, Rohr received his first Germany national team call-up by German manager Otto Nerz. There he found himself on the pitch with stars such as Ernst Kuzorra and Richard Hofmann. He played in a total of four national team matches through March 1933, receiving his first cap a year earlier against Switzerland (2–0) in March 1932. He later scored two goals in a 4–3 win against Sweden, one goal in a 1–3 loss to Italy, and two goals in a 3–3 draw with France. With five goals in four matches, Rohr looked to be on the verge of a very successful national career.

== Success Abroad ==
During the summer of 1933, Rohr transferred to Grasshoppers Zürich in the Swiss League, where he would go on to win the Swiss Cup. Although football results were important to him, Rohr's real mission was to earn a living playing football. In September 1934 he was expelled from Switzerland due to incorrect statements in his tax return. The pursuit of money convinced him to transfer to French League side Racing Strasbourg. Due to his numerous transfers, football magazine "Der Fußball" referred to Rohr as "the Gladiator, whom sells himself abroad."

This antagonism towards Rohr only endeared him even more to the press and fans in the Alsace. During the 1934–35 season, he proved his worth scoring 20 goals in 22 matches while leading Strasbourg to runner-up in the French Championship. The following season Rohr scored at an even higher rate, netting 28 goals in 28 matches. This performance saw him end up second on the French goal scoring list, with Strasbourg finishing third in the league. Although only finishing 6th in the league during the 1936–37 season, Rohr did obtain a French Cup runners-up medal with Strasbourg, as well as becoming the French League scoring champion with 30 goals. The following season he would finish again in second on the goal scoring list with 25 goals. With 117 Ligue 1 goals, Rohr is still the all-time goal scorer at Racing Strasbourg. He is still fondly remembered by fans of the club.

== War Years ==
The start of World War II in 1939, as well as the occupation of various parts of France by the German Army in 1940, troubled Rohr and he decided to flee to Sète in southern, unoccupied France where he live until 1942. During this time, the Third Reich declared him Persona non grata. It is unknown if he played at local club FC Sète during this time period; he was however, not listed on the players roster during the 1941–42 season. Additionally disputed is whether Rohr served as a member of the French Foreign Legion between 1940 and 1942.

In November 1942, he was sentenced to a three-month prison term after his arrest by French police in Marseille for "anti-French or communist propaganda." He was handed over to the authorities by his nephew, Philip Rohr. He served his sentence at the Strasbourg Citadel, after which he was handed over to German authorities. The Gestapo interned him in a concentration camp at Karlsruhe-Kieslau; two months later he was sent to the Eastern Front. After arriving at the Eastern Front, Rohr was permitted to join a German Army football team, enabling him to perform the one task he truly enjoyed; scoring goals. Shortly before the end of the war, a German pilot recognized him from his football days and offered him a flight back to Germany.

== Post war ==
After the war ended, Rohr decided to remain in Germany instead of returning to Strasbourg. Until 1949 he continued to play in the first division of German football (Oberliga Süd) for VfR Mannheim (1945–46, 7 matches, 3 goals), TSV Schwaben Augsburg (1945–46, 15 matches, 8 goals) and SV Waldhof (1948–49, 17 matches, 5 goals) as well as for (Oberliga Südwest) FK Pirmasens (1947–48, 21 matches, 11 goals). At VfR Rohr briefly played in the same side as his nephew Philipp. After his retirement, he worked as a clerk for the Mannheim city prosecutors office.

Gernot Rohr, grandnephew of Oskar Rohr, would eventually also play for FC Bayern as well as in the French League with Girondins Bordeaux; Gernot even became a French citizen in 1982 and worked as a football manager until 2005 in the same country where his great uncle, Oskar Rohr, made his name as the greatest goal scorer of the 1930s.
