= Harry Hart (footballer) =

English footballer (1926–2012)

Personal information
- Full name: Harry Hart
- Date of birth: 29 September 1926
- Place of birth: Sheffield, England
- Date of death: 2012 (aged 85–86)
- Position: Forward

Senior career*
Years	Team	Apps	(Gls)
1945–1950	Rotherham United	10	(4)
1950–1952	Coventry City	10	(1)
1952–1953	Grimsby Town	13	(3)
1953–1954	Frickley Colliery		
1954–1956	Gainsborough Trinity		
1956–195?	Stocksbridge Works		
- * Club domestic league appearances and goals

Harry Hart (29 September 1926 – 2012) was an English professional footballer who played as a forward.
