= Eric A. Johnson (microbiologist) =

American microbiologist and academic

- Occupations: Microbiologist and academic

Academic background
- Education: BS., Fermentation Science, UC Davis; MS., Food Science, UC Davis; Sc.d., Biotechnology, MIT; Postdoctoral fellowship., Bacterial Physiology and Genetics, Harvard Medical School
- Alma mater: University of California-Davis; Massachusetts Institute of Technology; Harvard Medical School

Eric A. Johnson is a microbiologist and an academic. He is a retired Professor of Bacteriology from the University of Wisconsin-Madison, serving from 1985 to 2020.

Johnson, most known for his research on Clostridium botulinum and its neurotoxins in food and industrial microbiology, has developed physiochemical-based methods for basic and applied research of Clostridium botulinum and botulinum neurotoxins. His laboratory is among the few US facilities for botulism studies. Together with his mentor Edward J. Schantz, he developed and produced the first FDA-approved batch of botox for human treatment.

Johnson is a Fellow of the American Academy of Microbiology and has been a member of numerous professional organizations. He served as a Member of the NIH study panel for bioterrorism-related research proposals and contributed to two NIH-NIAD review panels, namely Small Business: Infectious Diseases and Microbiology and Bacterial Biodefense. In addition, he served as the Editor for Applied and Environmental Microbiology and participated in the CDC program for bioterrorism preparedness. He was appointed as the ASM Waksman Foundation for Microbiology Lecturer and received the Educator Award from the International Association for Food Protection as well as the Society for Industrial Microbiology Waksman Outstanding Educator Award.

== Education and early career ==
In 1976, Johnson obtained his B.S. degree in Fermentation Science from the University of California-Davis. He held a position as a Staff Research Associate in the Bodega Marine Lab Aquaculture Program at the University of California-Davis from 1979 to 1980. In 1978, he earned his M.S. degree in Food Science from the same university and then completed his Sc.D. in Biotechnology in 1983 from the Massachusetts Institute of Technology. Following this, he pursued a postdoctoral fellowship at Harvard Medical School in Bacterial Physiology and Genetics, which he concluded in 1985.

== Career ==
Following his post-doctoral research, Johnson began his academic career in 1984 as an Assistant Instructor of Microbiology and Molecular Genetics at Harvard Medical School. He then joined the University of Wisconsin-Madison, served as an assistant professor of Food Microbiology and Toxicology from 1985 to 1990, and was appointed as a professor of Food Microbiology and Toxicology in 1996. Since 2007, he held an appointment as a professor of Bacteriology at the University of Wisconsin until his retirement in 2020.

== Research ==
Johnson's research has focused on toxicology and microbiology, with a particular focus on investigating the utilization of Phaffia rhodozyma yeast for astaxanthin production, studying different Clostridium strains, including Clostridium botulinum, and exploring the properties and applications of botulinum toxin.

=== Botulinum therapy ===
Johnson's research in toxicology has revealed insights into the properties, uses, and administration of botulinum toxin and other microbial neurotoxins in medicine, highlighting their implications. He, in collaboration with Edward J. Schantz, produced the first FDA-approved batch of botox, and developed Chemistry, Manufacturing, and Control (CMC) procedures for manufacture of botox, enabling its approval by the FDA on the last day of 1989. More specifically, he contributed to the purification and standardization of botulinum toxin preparations, as well as determined critical manufacturing and testing steps for FDA approval in initial strabismus studies. Having explored botulinum toxin therapy for regional movement disorders, he investigated dosage limitations to mitigate immunologic resistance associated with repeated high-dose injections, proposing a threshold of 100 LD50 units or less per injection cycle. Additionally, he explored different immunotypes of botulinum toxin, aiming to increase specific activity to reduce antigen exposure and prevent immunoresistance in human therapy. He made contributions by serving on a team that identified SV2 as the protein receptor for botulinum neurotoxin A, demonstrating its binding mechanism and the impact of SV2 expression on toxin entry. Furthermore, he highlighted advancements in botulinum treatment systems, explored new indication areas, addressed challenges in therapy, and emphasized the importance of drug development projects and enhanced accessibility.

=== Clostridium botulinum strains ===
Johnson has conducted research on Clostridium botulinum strains. In 2001, he examined the production of neurotoxin (BoNT) by Clostridium botulinum, shedding light on the regulatory factors involved in neurotoxigenic clostridia. Additionally, he investigated the cellulase system of Clostridium thermocellum, demonstrating comparable solubilization rates to Trichoderma reesei. His focus extended to exploring the therapeutic potential of clostridial toxins, particularly botulinum toxin, for various diseases. He emphasized the abundance of protein toxins in clostridia and proposed solutions to address the limitations of botulinum toxin. Furthermore, he developed a minimal chemically defined medium for the growth of Clostridium thermocellum, identifying specific growth factors such as biotin, pyridoxamine, vitamin B(12), and p-aminobenzoic acid. His research on Clostridium botulinum and Clostridium thermocellum improved understanding of clostridial metabolism, growth media, and cellulose degradation. Studying Clostridium botulinum strains Hall A, Okra B, and Iwanai E, he identified minimal nutritional requirements, advancing our understanding of essential nutrients and defined media for specific serotypes.

=== Phaffia rhodozyma ===
Johnson has also focused his research on Phaffia rhodozyma. Specifically, he initiated studies of astaxanthin formation in P. rhodozyma and identified optimal conditions for maximizing yeast and carotenoid production, contributing to advancements in astaxanthin production from P. rhodozyma. He has also explored astaxanthin production in microorganisms and revealed the influence of environmental factors on carotenogenesis. Additionally, he has optimized yeast cell preparation for enhanced astaxanthin production and deposition in salmonid diets.

== Awards and honors ==
- 2008 – Society for Industrial Microbiology Waksman Outstanding Educator Award

== Selected articles ==
- Johnson, E. A., & An, G. H. (1991). Astaxanthin from microbial sources. Critical reviews in Biotechnology, 11(4), 297–326.
- Schantz, E. J., & Johnson, E. A. (1992). Properties and use of botulinum toxin and other microbial neurotoxins in medicine. Microbiological reviews, 56(1), 80–99
- Borodic, G., Johnson, E., Goodnough, M., & Schantz, E. (1996). Botulinum toxin therapy, immunologic resistance, and problems with available materials. Neurology, 46(1), 26–29.
- Johnson, E. A., & Schroeder, W. A. (2006). Microbial carotenoids. Downstream processing biosurfactants carotenoids, 119–178.
- Dong, M., Yeh, F., Tepp, W. H., Dean, C., Johnson, E. A., Janz, R., & Chapman, E. R. (2006). SV2 is the protein receptor for botulinum neurotoxin A. Science, 312(5773), 592–596.
- Dressler, D., & Johnson, E. A. (2022). Botulinum toxin therapy: past, present and future developments. Journal of Neural Transmission, 129(5–6), 829–833.
