= Eric Johnson (footballer) =

Welsh association football player

Personal information
- Full name: Eric Johnson
- Date of birth: 16 December 1944 (age 81)
- Place of birth: Birkenhead, England
- Position: Left-half

Youth career
- Everton

Senior career*
| Years | Team | Apps | (Gls) |
| 1963–1966 | Wrexham | 28 | (0) |
- Rhyl
- * Club domestic league appearances and goals

Eric Johnson (born 16 December 1944) is an English former professional footballer who played as a left-half. He made appearances in the English Football League with Wrexham in the 1960s, along with playing in the Welsh league with Rhyl.
