= Eric Johnson (Australian sportsman) =

Australian rules footballer, born 1902

Personal information
- Full name: Eric Alfred Johnson
- Born: 17 July 1902; Norwood, South Australia
- Died: 10 January 1976 (aged 73); Adelaide
- Position: Rover

Playing career^{1}
Years	Club	Games (Goals)
1925–1934	Norwood	124 (192)
- ^{1} Playing statistics correct to the end of 1934.

Eric Alfred Johnson (17 July 1902 – 10 January 1976) was a South Australian sportsman who represented his state as both an Australian rules footballer and first-class cricketer. He played his league football for Norwood in the South Australian National Football League (SANFL) and cricket with the South Australia cricket team in the Sheffield Shield.

Johnson wasn't selected in Norwood's 1925 premiership team, during his first league season, but was a member of their premiership side in 1929. He captained Norwood to a grand final in 1933, from fourth in the ladder, but they lost to West Torrens. A rover, he represented the South Australian interstate team on one occasion.

As a right-handed batsman, Johnson played in six first-class cricket matches for South Australia. He had a modest record, only scoring 141 runs in ten completed innings, with a highest score of just 28. He took part in South Australia's 1927/28 and 1928/29 Sheffield Shield campaigns.

Soon after his football playing career ended, Johnson was appointed Norwood's treasurer, a role he would hold for almost 40 years.
