= 1936 in association football =

The following are the football events of the year 1936 throughout the world.

== Events ==
- Foundation of Beitar Jerusalem F.C.

== Winners club national championship ==
- Argentina: River Plate
- England: Sunderland
- France: RC Paris
- Italy: Bologna
- Netherlands: Feyenoord Rotterdam
- Paraguay: Olimpia Asunción
- Poland: Ruch Chorzów
- Romania: Ripensia Timișoara
- Scotland:
  - Division One: Celtic F.C.
  - Scottish Cup: Rangers F.C.
- Spain: Athletic Bilbao
- Soviet Union: see 1936 in Soviet football

== International tournaments ==
- 1936 British Home Championship (October 5, 1935 – April 4, 1936)

England

- Olympic Games in Berlin, Germany (August 3 – 15 1936)
  1. Italy
  2. Austria
  3. Norway

== Births ==
- January 6 – Anton Allemann, Swiss international footballer (died 2008)
- January 9 – Ion Nunweiller, Romanian international footballer (died 2015)
- January 16 – Tinus Bosselaar, Dutch footballer (died 2018)
- January 29 – Brian Hodgson, English professional footballer (died 2018)
- February 2 – Metin Oktay, Turkish international footballer (died 1991)
- February 7 – Luis Santibañez, Chilean football manager (died 2008)
- March 10 – Sepp Blatter, 8th President of FIFA
- April 25 – Leonel Sánchez, Chilean international footballer (died 2022)
- June 22 – Ferran Olivella, Spanish footballer
- July 2 – Eusebio Escobar, Colombian footballer
- July 11 – John McTurk, Scottish former footballer
- September 9 – Eddie Werge, English professional footballer (died 2007)
- September 20 – Salvador Reyes Monteón, Mexican football player (died 2012)
- October 1 – Ken Jones, English professional footballer (died 2018)
- October 9 – Sverre Andersen, Norwegian international footballer (died 2016)
- October 12 – Les Dodds, English retired professional footballer
- November 5 – Uwe Seeler, German international footballer

== Deaths ==
- March 9 – Alexander Watson Hutton, Scottish sportsman, founder of the Argentine Football Association and Alumni Athletic Club. (82)
