= 1935–36 Football League =

44th season of the Football League

The Football League
- Season: 1935–36
- Champions: Sunderland

The 1935–36 season was the 44th season of The Football League.

This season saw two significant changes in the First Division. Prior to this season Aston Villa and Blackburn Rovers had been the only ever-present members of English football's top division since the first edition in 1888–89. Both were relegated this season and ended their uninterrupted streaks.

== First Division ==
First Division
- Season: 1935–36
- Champions: Sunderland; 6th English title
- Relegated: Aston Villa; Blackburn Rovers
- Matches: 462
- Goals: 1,556 (3.37 per match)
- Top goalscorer: W. G. Richardson (39 goals)
- Biggest home win: Wolverhampton Wanderers 8–1 Blackburn Rovers (30 November 1935); West Bromwich Albion 8–1 Blackburn Rovers (18 January 1936); Manchester City 7–0 Bolton Wanderers (31 March 1936)
- Biggest away win: Aston Villa 0–7 West Bromwich Albion (19 October 1935)
- Highest scoring: Aston Villa 2–7 Middlesbrough (9 September 1935); Liverpool 7–2 Grimsby Town (14 September 1935); Sunderland 7–2 Blackburn Rovers (21 September 1935); Leeds United 7–2 Sheffield Wednesday (9 November 1935); Wolverhampton Wanderers 8–1 Blackburn Rovers (30 November 1935); Sunderland 7–2 Bolton Wanderers (7 December 1935); West Bromwich Albion 8–1 Blackburn Rovers (18 January 1936); Birmingham 2–7 Sunderland (13 April 1936)

| Pos | Team | Pld | W | D | L | GF | GA | GAv | Pts | Relegation |
|---|---|---|---|---|---|---|---|---|---|---|
| 1 | Sunderland (C) | 42 | 25 | 6 | 11 | 109 | 74 | 1.473 | 56 | |
| 2 | Derby County | 42 | 18 | 12 | 12 | 61 | 52 | 1.173 | 48 | |
| 3 | Huddersfield Town | 42 | 18 | 12 | 12 | 59 | 56 | 1.054 | 48 | |
| 4 | Stoke City | 42 | 20 | 7 | 15 | 57 | 57 | 1.000 | 47 | |
| 5 | Brentford | 42 | 17 | 12 | 13 | 81 | 60 | 1.350 | 46 | |
| 6 | Arsenal | 42 | 15 | 15 | 12 | 78 | 48 | 1.625 | 45 | |
| 7 | Preston North End | 42 | 18 | 8 | 16 | 67 | 64 | 1.047 | 44 | |
| 8 | Chelsea | 42 | 15 | 13 | 14 | 65 | 72 | 0.903 | 43 | |
| 9 | Manchester City | 42 | 17 | 8 | 17 | 68 | 60 | 1.133 | 42 | |
| 10 | Portsmouth | 42 | 17 | 8 | 17 | 54 | 67 | 0.806 | 42 | |
| 11 | Leeds United | 42 | 15 | 11 | 16 | 66 | 64 | 1.031 | 41 | |
| 12 | Birmingham | 42 | 15 | 11 | 16 | 61 | 63 | 0.968 | 41 | |
| 13 | Bolton Wanderers | 42 | 14 | 13 | 15 | 67 | 76 | 0.882 | 41 | |
| 14 | Middlesbrough | 42 | 15 | 10 | 17 | 84 | 70 | 1.200 | 40 | |
| 15 | Wolverhampton Wanderers | 42 | 15 | 10 | 17 | 77 | 76 | 1.013 | 40 | |
| 16 | Everton | 42 | 13 | 13 | 16 | 89 | 89 | 1.000 | 39 | |
| 17 | Grimsby Town | 42 | 17 | 5 | 20 | 65 | 73 | 0.890 | 39 | |
| 18 | West Bromwich Albion | 42 | 16 | 6 | 20 | 89 | 88 | 1.011 | 38 | |
| 19 | Liverpool | 42 | 13 | 12 | 17 | 60 | 64 | 0.938 | 38 | |
| 20 | Sheffield Wednesday | 42 | 13 | 12 | 17 | 63 | 77 | 0.818 | 38 | |
| 21 | Aston Villa (R) | 42 | 13 | 9 | 20 | 81 | 110 | 0.736 | 35 | Relegation to the Second Division |
| 22 | Blackburn Rovers (R) | 42 | 12 | 9 | 21 | 55 | 96 | 0.573 | 33 | Relegation to the Second Division |

Source: World Football
Rules for classification: 1) Points; 2) Goal average; 3) Goals scored
(C) Champions; (R) Relegated

=== Results ===
| Home \ Away | ARS | AST | BIR | BLB | BOL | BRE | CHE | DER | EVE | GRI | HUD | LEE | LIV | MCI | MID | POR | PNE | SHW | STK | SUN | WBA | WOL |
|---|---|---|---|---|---|---|---|---|---|---|---|---|---|---|---|---|---|---|---|---|---|---|
| Arsenal | | 1–0 | 1–1 | 5–1 | 1–1 | 1–1 | 1–1 | 1–1 | 1–1 | 6–0 | 1–1 | 2–2 | 1–2 | 2–3 | 2–0 | 2–3 | 2–1 | 2–2 | 1–0 | 3–1 | 4–0 | 4–0 |
| Aston Villa | 1–7 | | 2–1 | 2–4 | 1–2 | 2–2 | 2–2 | 0–2 | 1–1 | 2–6 | 4–1 | 3–3 | 3–0 | 2–2 | 2–7 | 4–2 | 5–1 | 1–2 | 4–0 | 2–2 | 0–7 | 4–2 |
| Birmingham | 1–1 | 2–2 | | 4–2 | 0–0 | 2–1 | 2–1 | 2–3 | 4–2 | 1–1 | 4–1 | 2–0 | 2–0 | 0–1 | 1–0 | 4–0 | 0–0 | 4–1 | 0–5 | 2–7 | 1–3 | 0–0 |
| Blackburn Rovers | 0–1 | 5–1 | 1–2 | | 0–3 | 1–0 | 1–0 | 0–0 | 1–1 | 1–0 | 2–1 | 0–3 | 2–2 | 4–1 | 2–2 | 3–1 | 1–1 | 3–2 | 0–1 | 1–1 | 3–1 | 1–0 |
| Bolton Wanderers | 2–1 | 4–3 | 2–0 | 3–1 | | 0–2 | 2–3 | 0–2 | 2–0 | 4–0 | 1–2 | 3–0 | 0–0 | 3–3 | 3–1 | 4–0 | 1–1 | 1–1 | 1–2 | 2–1 | 3–1 | 0–3 |
| Brentford | 2–1 | 1–2 | 0–1 | 3–1 | 4–0 | | 2–1 | 6–0 | 4–1 | 3–0 | 1–2 | 2–2 | 1–2 | 0–0 | 1–0 | 3–1 | 5–2 | 2–2 | 0–0 | 1–5 | 2–2 | 5–0 |
| Chelsea | 1–1 | 1–0 | 0–0 | 5–1 | 2–1 | 2–1 | | 1–1 | 2–2 | 0–2 | 1–0 | 1–0 | 2–2 | 2–1 | 2–1 | 1–0 | 5–2 | 1–2 | 3–5 | 3–1 | 2–2 | 2–2 |
| Derby County | 0–4 | 1–3 | 2–2 | 1–0 | 4–0 | 2–1 | 1–1 | | 3–3 | 2–0 | 2–0 | 2–1 | 2–2 | 3–0 | 3–2 | 1–1 | 2–0 | 3–1 | 0–1 | 4–0 | 2–0 | 3–1 |
| Everton | 0–2 | 2–2 | 4–3 | 4–0 | 3–3 | 1–2 | 5–1 | 4–0 | | 4–0 | 1–3 | 0–0 | 0–0 | 2–2 | 5–2 | 3–0 | 5–0 | 4–3 | 5–1 | 0–3 | 5–3 | 4–1 |
| Grimsby Town | 1–0 | 4–1 | 1–0 | 1–1 | 3–1 | 6–1 | 1–3 | 4–1 | 0–4 | | 1–1 | 0–1 | 0–0 | 3–1 | 1–0 | 1–2 | 0–0 | 4–0 | 3–0 | 4–0 | 4–2 | 2–1 |
| Huddersfield Town | 0–0 | 4–1 | 1–0 | 1–1 | 0–0 | 2–2 | 2–0 | 1–1 | 2–1 | 1–0 | | 1–2 | 1–0 | 1–1 | 4–1 | 1–1 | 1–0 | 1–0 | 2–1 | 1–0 | 2–3 | 3–0 |
| Leeds United | 1–1 | 4–2 | 0–0 | 1–4 | 5–2 | 1–2 | 2–0 | 1–0 | 3–1 | 1–2 | 2–2 | | 1–0 | 1–1 | 0–1 | 1–0 | 0–1 | 7–2 | 4–1 | 3–0 | 1–1 | 2–0 |
| Liverpool | 0–1 | 3–2 | 1–2 | 4–1 | 1–1 | 0–0 | 2–3 | 0–0 | 6–0 | 7–2 | 3–0 | 2–1 | | 0–2 | 2–2 | 2–0 | 2–1 | 1–0 | 2–0 | 0–3 | 5–0 | 0–2 |
| Manchester City | 1–0 | 5–0 | 3–1 | 2–0 | 7–0 | 2–1 | 0–0 | 1–0 | 1–0 | 0–3 | 1–2 | 1–3 | 6–0 | | 6–0 | 0–0 | 1–3 | 3–0 | 1–2 | 0–1 | 1–0 | 2–1 |
| Middlesbrough | 2–2 | 1–2 | 0–2 | 6–1 | 0–0 | 0–0 | 4–1 | 0–3 | 6–1 | 5–1 | 4–2 | 1–1 | 2–2 | 2–0 | | 3–2 | 2–0 | 5–0 | 0–0 | 6–0 | 3–1 | 4–2 |
| Portsmouth | 2–1 | 3–0 | 0–3 | 3–1 | 2–1 | 1–3 | 2–0 | 3–0 | 2–0 | 3–2 | 0–0 | 2–2 | 2–1 | 1–2 | 1–0 | | 1–1 | 3–2 | 2–0 | 2–2 | 3–1 | 1–0 |
| Preston North End | 1–0 | 3–0 | 3–1 | 2–0 | 1–0 | 2–4 | 2–0 | 1–0 | 2–2 | 1–0 | 4–0 | 5–0 | 3–1 | 4–0 | 0–5 | 1–1 | | 0–1 | 1–1 | 3–2 | 3–0 | 2–0 |
| Sheffield Wednesday | 3–2 | 5–2 | 3–1 | 0–0 | 2–2 | 3–3 | 4–1 | 1–0 | 3–3 | 3–0 | 1–2 | 3–0 | 0–0 | 1–0 | 0–0 | 0–1 | 1–0 | | 0–1 | 0–0 | 2–5 | 0–0 |
| Stoke City | 0–3 | 2–3 | 3–1 | 2–0 | 1–2 | 2–2 | 3–0 | 0–0 | 2–1 | 1–0 | 1–0 | 3–1 | 2–1 | 1–0 | 1–1 | 2–0 | 2–1 | 0–3 | | 0–2 | 3–2 | 4–1 |
| Sunderland | 5–4 | 1–3 | 2–1 | 7–2 | 7–2 | 1–3 | 3–3 | 3–1 | 3–3 | 3–1 | 4–3 | 2–1 | 2–0 | 2–0 | 2–1 | 5–0 | 4–2 | 5–1 | 1–0 | | 6–1 | 3–1 |
| West Bromwich Albion | 1–0 | 0–3 | 0–0 | 8–1 | 2–2 | 1–0 | 1–2 | 0–3 | 6–1 | 4–1 | 1–2 | 3–2 | 6–1 | 5–1 | 5–2 | 2–0 | 2–4 | 2–2 | 2–0 | 1–3 | | 2–1 |
| Wolverhampton Wanderers | 2–2 | 2–2 | 3–1 | 8–1 | 3–3 | 3–2 | 3–3 | 0–0 | 4–0 | 1–0 | 2–2 | 3–0 | 3–1 | 4–3 | 4–0 | 2–0 | 4–2 | 2–1 | 1–1 | 3–4 | 2–0 | |

Updated to match(es) played on unknown. Source:
Legend: Blue = home team win; Yellow = draw; Red = away team win.

=== Maps ===
Locations of the Football League First Division London teams
Locations of the Football League First Division teams

== Second Division ==
Second Division
- Season: 1935–36
- Champions: Manchester United
- Promoted: Manchester United; Charlton Athletic
- Relegated: Port Vale; Hull City
- Matches: 462
- Goals: 1,533 (3.32 per match)
- Top goalscorer: Bobby Finan; Jock Dodds (34 goals each)
- Biggest home win: Tottenham Hotspur 8–0 Southampton (28 March 1936)
- Biggest away win: Bury 2–6 Nottingham Forest (28 December 1935); Port Vale 0–4 Barnsley (28 Dec 1935); Port Vale 1–5 Tottenham Hotspur (1 February 1936); Bury 0–4 Burnley (18 April 1936)
- Highest scoring: Nottingham Forest 9–2 Port Vale (23 November 1935)

| Pos | Team | Pld | W | D | L | GF | GA | GAv | Pts | Promotion or relegation |
|---|---|---|---|---|---|---|---|---|---|---|
| 1 | Manchester United (C, P) | 42 | 22 | 12 | 8 | 85 | 43 | 1.977 | 56 | Promotion to the First Division |
| 2 | Charlton Athletic (P) | 42 | 22 | 11 | 9 | 85 | 58 | 1.466 | 55 | Promotion to the First Division |
| 3 | Sheffield United | 42 | 20 | 12 | 10 | 79 | 50 | 1.580 | 52 | |
| 4 | West Ham United | 42 | 22 | 8 | 12 | 90 | 68 | 1.324 | 52 | |
| 5 | Tottenham Hotspur | 42 | 18 | 13 | 11 | 91 | 55 | 1.655 | 49 | |
| 6 | Leicester City | 42 | 19 | 10 | 13 | 79 | 57 | 1.386 | 48 | |
| 7 | Plymouth Argyle | 42 | 20 | 8 | 14 | 71 | 57 | 1.246 | 48 | |
| 8 | Newcastle United | 42 | 20 | 6 | 16 | 88 | 79 | 1.114 | 46 | |
| 9 | Fulham | 42 | 15 | 14 | 13 | 76 | 52 | 1.462 | 44 | |
| 10 | Blackpool | 42 | 18 | 7 | 17 | 93 | 72 | 1.292 | 43 | |
| 11 | Norwich City | 42 | 17 | 9 | 16 | 72 | 65 | 1.108 | 43 | |
| 12 | Bradford City | 42 | 15 | 13 | 14 | 55 | 65 | 0.846 | 43 | |
| 13 | Swansea Town | 42 | 15 | 9 | 18 | 67 | 76 | 0.882 | 39 | |
| 14 | Bury | 42 | 13 | 12 | 17 | 66 | 84 | 0.786 | 38 | |
| 15 | Burnley | 42 | 12 | 13 | 17 | 50 | 59 | 0.847 | 37 | |
| 16 | Bradford (Park Avenue) | 42 | 14 | 9 | 19 | 62 | 84 | 0.738 | 37 | |
| 17 | Southampton | 42 | 14 | 9 | 19 | 47 | 65 | 0.723 | 37 | |
| 18 | Doncaster Rovers | 42 | 14 | 9 | 19 | 51 | 71 | 0.718 | 37 | |
| 19 | Nottingham Forest | 42 | 12 | 11 | 19 | 69 | 76 | 0.908 | 35 | |
| 20 | Barnsley | 42 | 12 | 9 | 21 | 54 | 80 | 0.675 | 33 | |
| 21 | Port Vale (R) | 42 | 12 | 8 | 22 | 56 | 106 | 0.528 | 32 | Relegation to the Third Division North |
| 22 | Hull City (R) | 42 | 5 | 10 | 27 | 47 | 111 | 0.423 | 20 | Relegation to the Third Division North |

Rules for classification: 1) Points; 2) Goal average; 3) Goals scored
(C) Champions; (P) Promoted; (R) Relegated

=== Results ===
| Home \ Away | BAR | BLP | BRA | BPA | BUR | BRY | CHA | DON | FUL | HUL | LEI | MUN | NEW | NWC | NOT | PLY | PTV | SHU | SOU | SWA | TOT | WHU |
|---|---|---|---|---|---|---|---|---|---|---|---|---|---|---|---|---|---|---|---|---|---|---|
| Barnsley | | 1–2 | 0–1 | 5–1 | 3–1 | 1–1 | 1–2 | 2–1 | 2–0 | 5–1 | 3–3 | 0–3 | 3–2 | 2–3 | 0–2 | 1–2 | 4–2 | 3–2 | 3–1 | 0–0 | 0–0 | 1–2 |
| Blackpool | 3–0 | | 3–3 | 4–2 | 2–0 | 2–3 | 6–2 | 5–2 | 1–1 | 4–1 | 3–5 | 4–1 | 6–0 | 2–1 | 1–4 | 3–1 | 3–1 | 3–0 | 2–1 | 1–1 | 2–4 | 4–1 |
| Bradford City | 1–1 | 2–1 | | 2–1 | 0–0 | 2–0 | 2–1 | 3–1 | 1–0 | 1–1 | 2–0 | 1–0 | 3–2 | 0–1 | 0–0 | 2–2 | 1–1 | 2–1 | 2–1 | 2–2 | 0–1 | 3–1 |
| Bradford Park Avenue | 3–0 | 3–2 | 1–1 | | 2–0 | 1–1 | 3–0 | 3–1 | 1–1 | 2–1 | 3–1 | 1–0 | 3–2 | 1–0 | 1–4 | 2–2 | 3–0 | 3–3 | 2–1 | 1–1 | 2–5 | 2–0 |
| Burnley | 3–0 | 3–2 | 3–0 | 1–1 | | 1–1 | 0–2 | 1–1 | 0–2 | 2–0 | 2–2 | 2–2 | 1–2 | 1–1 | 1–0 | 0–1 | 5–1 | 1–1 | 2–0 | 5–2 | 0–0 | 1–0 |
| Bury | 3–0 | 1–1 | 1–1 | 1–0 | 0–4 | | 1–1 | 5–1 | 0–0 | 3–1 | 3–0 | 2–3 | 3–4 | 0–1 | 2–6 | 2–0 | 5–0 | 3–2 | 0–0 | 2–1 | 1–1 | 3–0 |
| Charlton Athletic | 3–0 | 1–1 | 2–1 | 3–1 | 4–0 | 5–2 | | 3–0 | 2–1 | 4–1 | 1–0 | 0–0 | 4–2 | 4–1 | 4–0 | 1–1 | 1–1 | 1–1 | 2–0 | 4–1 | 2–1 | 2–2 |
| Doncaster Rovers | 1–1 | 0–3 | 2–1 | 3–2 | 1–0 | 1–0 | 2–0 | | 0–0 | 6–1 | 1–0 | 0–0 | 2–2 | 3–0 | 0–0 | 1–2 | 2–0 | 0–0 | 0–1 | 1–1 | 2–1 | 0–2 |
| Fulham | 1–1 | 4–2 | 5–1 | 4–1 | 2–2 | 7–0 | 0–0 | 1–3 | | 3–0 | 2–0 | 2–2 | 3–1 | 1–1 | 6–0 | 2–2 | 7–0 | 3–1 | 0–2 | 0–1 | 1–2 | 4–2 |
| Hull City | 1–3 | 0–3 | 2–5 | 1–1 | 1–2 | 2–3 | 2–4 | 2–3 | 1–1 | | 3–3 | 1–1 | 2–3 | 0–0 | 2–1 | 2–1 | 1–2 | 2–2 | 2–2 | 3–2 | 1–0 | 2–3 |
| Leicester City | 2–0 | 4–1 | 2–1 | 5–0 | 2–0 | 1–2 | 4–1 | 6–0 | 5–2 | 2–2 | | 1–1 | 1–0 | 1–1 | 2–1 | 2–0 | 2–0 | 1–3 | 1–1 | 4–1 | 4–1 | 1–1 |
| Manchester United | 1–1 | 3–2 | 3–1 | 4–0 | 4–0 | 2–1 | 3–0 | 0–0 | 1–0 | 2–0 | 0–1 | | 3–1 | 2–1 | 5–0 | 3–2 | 7–2 | 3–1 | 4–0 | 3–0 | 0–0 | 2–3 |
| Newcastle United | 3–0 | 1–0 | 3–2 | 3–3 | 1–1 | 3–0 | 1–2 | 2–1 | 6–2 | 4–1 | 3–1 | 0–2 | | 1–1 | 5–1 | 5–0 | 2–2 | 3–0 | 4–1 | 2–0 | 1–4 | 3–3 |
| Norwich City | 3–1 | 0–1 | 1–1 | 4–1 | 2–0 | 5–3 | 3–1 | 2–1 | 1–0 | 3–0 | 1–2 | 3–5 | 1–0 | | 4–0 | 0–0 | 4–2 | 0–1 | 5–1 | 0–1 | 1–0 | 4–3 |
| Nottingham Forest | 6–0 | 2–2 | 1–0 | 2–0 | 2–0 | 2–2 | 0–0 | 6–2 | 1–1 | 0–0 | 0–1 | 1–1 | 1–2 | 2–2 | | 0–1 | 9–2 | 0–1 | 2–0 | 2–2 | 4–1 | 0–2 |
| Plymouth Argyle | 7–1 | 3–2 | 0–1 | 2–0 | 2–0 | 3–0 | 4–2 | 1–3 | 2–0 | 0–1 | 2–1 | 3–1 | 1–0 | 5–1 | 3–1 | | 4–1 | 1–1 | 0–0 | 1–2 | 2–1 | 4–1 |
| Port Vale | 0–4 | 2–2 | 2–1 | 3–2 | 1–1 | 2–2 | 2–1 | 2–0 | 1–0 | 4–0 | 1–1 | 0–3 | 3–0 | 3–1 | 2–0 | 2–0 | | 1–1 | 0–2 | 0–1 | 1–5 | 2–3 |
| Sheffield United | 2–0 | 1–0 | 3–0 | 2–1 | 2–0 | 3–0 | 2–2 | 3–0 | 0–1 | 7–0 | 1–2 | 1–1 | 5–1 | 3–2 | 1–0 | 0–0 | 4–0 | | 2–1 | 4–1 | 1–1 | 4–2 |
| Southampton | 0–1 | 1–0 | 0–0 | 3–0 | 1–0 | 0–0 | 2–5 | 1–0 | 1–2 | 1–0 | 1–0 | 2–1 | 1–3 | 1–1 | 7–2 | 2–0 | 0–1 | 0–1 | | 4–3 | 2–0 | 2–4 |
| Swansea Town | 0–0 | 1–0 | 8–1 | 1–2 | 1–3 | 4–1 | 1–2 | 2–0 | 0–2 | 6–1 | 2–0 | 2–1 | 1–2 | 4–3 | 2–1 | 2–0 | 3–2 | 1–3 | 0–0 | | 1–1 | 0–1 |
| Tottenham Hotspur | 3–0 | 3–1 | 4–0 | 4–0 | 5–1 | 4–3 | 1–1 | 3–1 | 2–2 | 3–1 | 1–1 | 0–0 | 1–2 | 2–1 | 1–1 | 1–2 | 5–2 | 1–1 | 8–0 | 7–2 | | 1–3 |
| West Ham United | 2–0 | 2–1 | 1–1 | 1–0 | 0–0 | 6–0 | 1–3 | 1–2 | 0–0 | 4–1 | 3–2 | 1–2 | 4–1 | 3–2 | 5–2 | 4–2 | 4–0 | 3–2 | 0–0 | 4–0 | 2–2 | |

Updated to match(es) played on unknown. Source: Ian Laschke: Rothmans Book of Football League Records 1888–89 to 1978–79. Macdonald and Jane's, London & Sydney, 1980.
Legend: Blue = home team win; Yellow = draw; Red = away team win.

=== Maps ===
Locations of the Football League Second Division London teams
Locations of the Football League Second Division teams

== Third Division North ==
Football League Third Division North
- Season: 1935–1936
- Champions: Chesterfield (2nd title)
- Failed re-election: None
- Matches: 462
- Goals: 1,533 (3.32 per match)
- Top goalscorer: Robert Bell (Tranmere Rovers), 33

| Pos | Team | Pld | W | D | L | GF | GA | GAv | Pts | Promotion or relegation |
|---|---|---|---|---|---|---|---|---|---|---|
| 1 | Chesterfield (C, P) | 42 | 24 | 12 | 6 | 92 | 39 | 2.359 | 60 | Promotion to the Second Division |
| 2 | Chester | 42 | 22 | 11 | 9 | 100 | 45 | 2.222 | 55 | |
| 3 | Tranmere Rovers | 42 | 22 | 11 | 9 | 93 | 58 | 1.603 | 55 | |
| 4 | Lincoln City | 42 | 22 | 9 | 11 | 91 | 51 | 1.784 | 53 | |
| 5 | Stockport County | 42 | 20 | 8 | 14 | 65 | 49 | 1.327 | 48 | |
| 6 | Crewe Alexandra | 42 | 19 | 9 | 14 | 80 | 76 | 1.053 | 47 | |
| 7 | Oldham Athletic | 42 | 18 | 9 | 15 | 86 | 73 | 1.178 | 45 | |
| 8 | Hartlepools United | 42 | 15 | 12 | 15 | 57 | 61 | 0.934 | 42 | |
| 9 | Accrington Stanley | 42 | 17 | 8 | 17 | 63 | 72 | 0.875 | 42 | |
| 10 | Walsall | 42 | 16 | 9 | 17 | 79 | 59 | 1.339 | 41 | Transferred to the Third Division South |
| 11 | Rotherham United | 42 | 16 | 9 | 17 | 69 | 66 | 1.045 | 41 | |
| 12 | Darlington | 42 | 17 | 6 | 19 | 74 | 79 | 0.937 | 40 | |
| 13 | Carlisle United | 42 | 14 | 12 | 16 | 56 | 62 | 0.903 | 40 | |
| 14 | Gateshead | 42 | 13 | 14 | 15 | 56 | 76 | 0.737 | 40 | |
| 15 | Barrow | 42 | 13 | 12 | 17 | 58 | 65 | 0.892 | 38 | |
| 16 | York City | 42 | 13 | 12 | 17 | 62 | 95 | 0.653 | 38 | |
| 17 | Halifax Town | 42 | 15 | 7 | 20 | 57 | 61 | 0.934 | 37 | |
| 18 | Wrexham | 42 | 15 | 7 | 20 | 66 | 75 | 0.880 | 37 | |
| 19 | Mansfield Town | 42 | 14 | 9 | 19 | 80 | 91 | 0.879 | 37 | |
| 20 | Rochdale | 42 | 10 | 13 | 19 | 58 | 88 | 0.659 | 33 | |
| 21 | Southport | 42 | 11 | 9 | 22 | 48 | 90 | 0.533 | 31 | Re-elected |
| 22 | New Brighton | 42 | 9 | 6 | 27 | 43 | 102 | 0.422 | 24 | Re-elected |

Source: rsssf.com
(C) Champions; (P) Promoted

=== Results ===
| Home \ Away | ACC | BRW | CRL | CHE | CHF | CRE | DAR | GAT | HAL | HAR | LIN | MAN | NWB | OLD | ROC | ROT | SOU | STP | TRA | WAL | WRE | YOR |
|---|---|---|---|---|---|---|---|---|---|---|---|---|---|---|---|---|---|---|---|---|---|---|
| Accrington Stanley | | 2–0 | 0–0 | 0–3 | 0–1 | 2–1 | 1–0 | 6–1 | 2–0 | 3–2 | 2–2 | 1–1 | 5–2 | 1–0 | 2–4 | 1–1 | 1–0 | 1–1 | 3–1 | 3–1 | 0–1 | 7–2 |
| Barrow | 0–1 | | 1–1 | 2–4 | 1–1 | 1–1 | 2–0 | 3–0 | 0–0 | 1–1 | 0–0 | 2–2 | 3–0 | 3–0 | 6–2 | 3–0 | 0–1 | 1–0 | 0–0 | 1–0 | 2–1 | 1–1 |
| Carlisle United | 3–1 | 2–2 | | 1–3 | 2–1 | 1–2 | 3–0 | 2–0 | 0–0 | 0–0 | 4–1 | 3–0 | 3–0 | 2–1 | 4–3 | 1–1 | 4–0 | 2–1 | 0–1 | 2–1 | 5–1 | 0–0 |
| Chester | 4–0 | 1–2 | 3–2 | | 1–1 | 0–1 | 4–1 | 4–0 | 3–1 | 4–0 | 4–2 | 4–0 | 8–2 | 1–1 | 5–2 | 0–0 | 5–1 | 2–0 | 1–1 | 2–0 | 1–1 | 12–0 |
| Chesterfield | 0–3 | 6–1 | 5–0 | 1–0 | | 6–0 | 5–1 | 2–0 | 3–1 | 2–0 | 0–1 | 2–1 | 3–1 | 3–0 | 2–2 | 5–0 | 5–0 | 0–0 | 0–1 | 3–0 | 5–0 | 2–2 |
| Crewe Alexandra | 4–0 | 3–1 | 2–0 | 1–1 | 5–6 | | 2–0 | 2–4 | 3–2 | 3–2 | 2–1 | 1–1 | 5–1 | 2–2 | 3–1 | 4–1 | 4–1 | 0–1 | 0–0 | 4–3 | 3–2 | 2–1 |
| Darlington | 2–1 | 4–1 | 4–1 | 1–1 | 1–2 | 2–2 | | 5–2 | 3–2 | 4–2 | 1–0 | 2–1 | 4–1 | 5–0 | 4–0 | 3–1 | 3–2 | 3–1 | 1–3 | 1–1 | 4–2 | 3–0 |
| Gateshead | 0–0 | 4–3 | 1–1 | 2–0 | 3–3 | 2–1 | 1–1 | | 2–2 | 1–0 | 4–0 | 3–1 | 3–1 | 0–0 | 1–0 | 1–1 | 3–1 | 1–0 | 1–1 | 2–2 | 2–0 | 0–0 |
| Halifax Town | 1–0 | 3–2 | 1–0 | 2–3 | 2–3 | 2–4 | 0–1 | 1–1 | | 0–1 | 2–1 | 1–0 | 3–0 | 4–2 | 2–0 | 1–0 | 1–2 | 0–0 | 1–0 | 1–1 | 4–1 | 2–0 |
| Hartlepool | 2–1 | 0–0 | 1–1 | 0–2 | 2–1 | 1–0 | 2–1 | 2–0 | 1–0 | | 1–1 | 4–1 | 4–1 | 0–1 | 1–0 | 5–1 | 2–1 | 1–1 | 2–2 | 5–0 | 1–1 | 4–2 |
| Lincoln City | 6–0 | 2–0 | 2–0 | 1–1 | 0–1 | 6–2 | 2–1 | 5–0 | 3–1 | 1–0 | | 1–2 | 2–0 | 2–1 | 5–1 | 4–0 | 4–0 | 3–0 | 5–0 | 4–1 | 3–1 | 3–2 |
| Mansfield Town | 3–1 | 1–3 | 1–1 | 0–0 | 0–1 | 1–1 | 4–2 | 3–1 | 3–2 | 4–0 | 2–2 | | 2–0 | 1–0 | 3–0 | 8–2 | 5–1 | 2–1 | 2–3 | 2–2 | 3–2 | 5–0 |
| New Brighton | 2–3 | 2–3 | 3–0 | 3–3 | 1–2 | 3–1 | 1–1 | 1–0 | 1–4 | 0–0 | 0–5 | 1–0 | | 1–3 | 2–0 | 3–0 | 2–1 | 2–0 | 0–0 | 1–1 | 0–4 | 0–2 |
| Oldham Athletic | 3–0 | 3–1 | 3–0 | 1–3 | 0–0 | 0–0 | 2–0 | 2–2 | 3–0 | 2–2 | 2–3 | 4–1 | 6–0 | | 3–3 | 4–1 | 4–0 | 1–3 | 4–1 | 2–1 | 5–2 | 6–2 |
| Rochdale | 2–2 | 1–1 | 0–0 | 1–1 | 1–1 | 2–1 | 1–1 | 5–0 | 2–0 | 0–1 | 0–0 | 3–1 | 1–0 | 2–6 | | 1–1 | 2–1 | 1–1 | 0–0 | 6–4 | 2–1 | 2–3 |
| Rotherham United | 1–3 | 1–0 | 4–0 | 1–2 | 0–0 | 3–1 | 4–0 | 3–0 | 2–0 | 3–0 | 1–1 | 2–1 | 5–0 | 1–0 | 6–0 | | 5–0 | 1–1 | 1–2 | 2–0 | 1–2 | 5–0 |
| Southport | 2–1 | 3–1 | 0–3 | 2–1 | 1–0 | 1–1 | 4–1 | 1–1 | 2–0 | 1–1 | 0–3 | 3–3 | 2–1 | 1–1 | 1–1 | 2–1 | | 2–3 | 1–1 | 1–0 | 1–1 | 0–1 |
| Stockport County | 1–2 | 2–1 | 2–0 | 2–0 | 2–2 | 0–1 | 2–0 | 3–1 | 1–0 | 2–1 | 4–0 | 6–1 | 1–1 | 2–0 | 4–0 | 1–2 | 2–0 | | 2–1 | 0–1 | 3–2 | 3–2 |
| Tranmere | 6–0 | 1–0 | 4–1 | 3–1 | 1–3 | 4–2 | 2–0 | 2–0 | 0–2 | 3–1 | 1–1 | 4–2 | 3–1 | 13–4 | 5–2 | 2–2 | 5–2 | 4–1 | | 3–1 | 6–1 | 3–1 |
| Walsall | 2–0 | 5–1 | 3–0 | 1–0 | 1–1 | 4–1 | 4–1 | 2–0 | 2–1 | 6–0 | 4–1 | 7–0 | 1–2 | 1–2 | 1–0 | 0–1 | 3–1 | 0–1 | 0–0 | | 5–0 | 6–0 |
| Wrexham | 3–0 | 2–0 | 1–1 | 1–0 | 0–1 | 0–1 | 3–1 | 2–4 | 1–3 | 1–0 | 1–1 | 5–1 | 3–0 | 0–1 | 0–1 | 2–0 | 4–2 | 4–0 | 4–0 | 1–1 | | 1–0 |
| York City | 1–1 | 1–2 | 2–0 | 1–2 | 1–1 | 4–1 | 4–1 | 2–2 | 2–2 | 2–2 | 2–1 | 7–5 | 2–0 | 3–1 | 2–1 | 2–1 | 0–0 | 0–4 | 2–0 | 0–0 | 1–1 | |

Updated to match(es) played on unknown. Source: Ian Laschke: Rothmans Book of Football League Records 1888–89 to 1978–79. Macdonald and Jane's, London & Sydney, 1980.
Legend: Blue = home team win; Yellow = draw; Red = away team win.

=== Maps ===
Locations of the Football League Third Division North teams

== Third Division South ==
Football League Third Division South
- Season: 1935–1936
- Champions: Coventry City (1st title)
- Failed re-election: None
- Matches: 462
- Goals: 1,497 (3.24 per match)
- Top goalscorer: Albert Dawes (Crystal Palace), 38

| Pos | Team | Pld | W | D | L | GF | GA | GAv | Pts | Promotion |
|---|---|---|---|---|---|---|---|---|---|---|
| 1 | Coventry City (C, P) | 42 | 24 | 9 | 9 | 102 | 45 | 2.267 | 57 | Promotion to the Second Division |
| 2 | Luton Town | 42 | 22 | 12 | 8 | 81 | 45 | 1.800 | 56 | |
| 3 | Reading | 42 | 26 | 2 | 14 | 87 | 62 | 1.403 | 54 | |
| 4 | Queens Park Rangers | 42 | 22 | 9 | 11 | 84 | 53 | 1.585 | 53 | |
| 5 | Watford | 42 | 20 | 9 | 13 | 80 | 54 | 1.481 | 49 | |
| 6 | Crystal Palace | 42 | 22 | 5 | 15 | 96 | 74 | 1.297 | 49 | |
| 7 | Brighton & Hove Albion | 42 | 18 | 8 | 16 | 70 | 63 | 1.111 | 44 | |
| 8 | Bournemouth & Boscombe Athletic | 42 | 16 | 11 | 15 | 60 | 56 | 1.071 | 43 | |
| 9 | Notts County | 42 | 15 | 12 | 15 | 60 | 57 | 1.053 | 42 | |
| 10 | Torquay United | 42 | 16 | 9 | 17 | 62 | 62 | 1.000 | 41 | |
| 11 | Aldershot | 42 | 14 | 12 | 16 | 53 | 61 | 0.869 | 40 | |
| 12 | Millwall | 42 | 14 | 12 | 16 | 58 | 71 | 0.817 | 40 | |
| 13 | Bristol City | 42 | 15 | 10 | 17 | 48 | 59 | 0.814 | 40 | |
| 14 | Clapton Orient | 42 | 16 | 6 | 20 | 55 | 61 | 0.902 | 38 | |
| 15 | Northampton Town | 42 | 15 | 8 | 19 | 62 | 90 | 0.689 | 38 | |
| 16 | Gillingham | 42 | 14 | 9 | 19 | 66 | 77 | 0.857 | 37 | |
| 17 | Bristol Rovers | 42 | 14 | 9 | 19 | 69 | 95 | 0.726 | 37 | |
| 18 | Southend United | 42 | 13 | 10 | 19 | 61 | 62 | 0.984 | 36 | |
| 19 | Swindon Town | 42 | 14 | 8 | 20 | 64 | 73 | 0.877 | 36 | |
| 20 | Cardiff City | 42 | 13 | 10 | 19 | 60 | 73 | 0.822 | 36 | |
| 21 | Newport County | 42 | 11 | 9 | 22 | 60 | 111 | 0.541 | 31 | Re-elected |
| 22 | Exeter City | 42 | 8 | 11 | 23 | 59 | 93 | 0.634 | 27 | Re-elected |

(C) Champions; (P) Promoted

=== Results ===
| Home \ Away | ALD | B&BA | B&HA | BRI | BRR | CAR | CLA | COV | CRY | EXE | GIL | LUT | MIL | NPC | NOR | NTC | QPR | REA | STD | SWI | TOR | WAT |
|---|---|---|---|---|---|---|---|---|---|---|---|---|---|---|---|---|---|---|---|---|---|---|
| Aldershot | | 2–0 | 1–0 | 0–0 | 6–1 | 1–1 | 1–0 | 1–2 | 1–3 | 3–0 | 0–2 | 0–1 | 1–1 | 1–1 | 2–0 | 3–1 | 1–3 | 1–0 | 1–1 | 1–3 | 1–0 | 1–1 |
| Bournemouth & Boscombe Athletic | 0–0 | | 1–2 | 3–0 | 2–1 | 4–4 | 2–0 | 1–1 | 2–5 | 1–1 | 1–2 | 2–1 | 1–2 | 2–0 | 4–0 | 0–1 | 0–1 | 4–1 | 2–1 | 1–0 | 1–1 | 2–2 |
| Brighton & Hove Albion | 2–1 | 0–1 | | 3–0 | 4–1 | 1–0 | 1–3 | 2–1 | 2–1 | 3–1 | 1–1 | 1–1 | 0–0 | 7–1 | 5–1 | 5–1 | 1–1 | 4–2 | 1–3 | 0–2 | 3–2 | 2–1 |
| Bristol City | 1–0 | 1–0 | 0–3 | | 0–2 | 0–2 | 2–0 | 0–0 | 2–0 | 2–1 | 2–1 | 1–2 | 4–1 | 1–2 | 3–2 | 1–1 | 0–0 | 1–1 | 2–1 | 5–0 | 2–0 | 2–2 |
| Bristol Rovers | 2–2 | 2–1 | 5–2 | 1–1 | | 1–1 | 1–1 | 3–2 | 2–4 | 6–1 | 4–3 | 2–2 | 2–0 | 3–0 | 5–2 | 0–0 | 0–1 | 1–4 | 3–2 | 2–1 | 3–0 | 0–1 |
| Cardiff City | 0–1 | 1–1 | 1–0 | 1–0 | 0–0 | | 4–1 | 1–0 | 1–1 | 5–2 | 4–0 | 2–3 | 3–1 | 2–0 | 0–0 | 3–2 | 3–2 | 2–3 | 1–1 | 2–1 | 1–2 | 0–2 |
| Clapton Orient | 0–1 | 1–1 | 3–1 | 2–0 | 2–0 | 2–1 | | 0–1 | 1–0 | 1–2 | 3–1 | 3–0 | 1–0 | 4–0 | 4–0 | 0–2 | 1–0 | 1–0 | 3–0 | 1–2 | 1–1 | 0–2 |
| Coventry City | 0–2 | 2–0 | 5–0 | 3–1 | 3–1 | 5–1 | 2–0 | | 8–1 | 3–0 | 4–0 | 0–0 | 5–0 | 7–1 | 4–0 | 5–1 | 6–1 | 3–1 | 3–0 | 3–1 | 2–1 | 2–0 |
| Crystal Palace | 2–1 | 2–0 | 4–0 | 6–1 | 5–3 | 3–2 | 2–2 | 3–1 | | 2–2 | 1–1 | 5–1 | 5–0 | 6–0 | 6–1 | 0–0 | 0–2 | 2–0 | 3–0 | 5–1 | 1–0 | 1–2 |
| Exeter City | 5–1 | 1–3 | 3–3 | 0–1 | 3–1 | 2–0 | 2–3 | 1–3 | 1–0 | | 2–5 | 1–2 | 4–3 | 3–3 | 3–1 | 0–0 | 0–0 | 4–5 | 1–0 | 0–3 | 1–1 | 1–3 |
| Gillingham | 4–2 | 1–2 | 1–2 | 2–1 | 1–2 | 3–0 | 3–0 | 1–1 | 0–2 | 2–2 | | 0–1 | 1–3 | 3–0 | 2–3 | 0–0 | 2–2 | 2–0 | 2–1 | 3–1 | 1–0 | 0–0 |
| Luton Town | 2–2 | 0–0 | 2–1 | 1–0 | 12–0 | 2–2 | 5–3 | 1–1 | 6–0 | 3–1 | 1–2 | | 0–0 | 7–0 | 3–3 | 1–0 | 2–0 | 2–1 | 1–2 | 2–1 | 1–0 | 2–1 |
| Millwall | 1–2 | 3–0 | 0–0 | 1–1 | 2–1 | 2–4 | 1–0 | 2–2 | 4–0 | 2–2 | 4–1 | 0–0 | | 2–2 | 2–1 | 2–1 | 2–0 | 0–1 | 1–2 | 1–0 | 1–1 | 0–0 |
| Newport County | 1–1 | 0–0 | 0–2 | 2–0 | 1–0 | 0–0 | 2–3 | 2–1 | 2–5 | 2–1 | 4–2 | 0–2 | 4–1 | | 5–1 | 1–2 | 3–4 | 1–5 | 3–1 | 2–2 | 1–6 | 0–5 |
| Northampton Town | 3–0 | 2–1 | 1–0 | 0–2 | 3–3 | 2–0 | 2–0 | 2–4 | 3–1 | 1–1 | 0–0 | 0–0 | 2–4 | 3–0 | | 3–1 | 1–4 | 4–2 | 2–0 | 0–0 | 2–1 | 2–0 |
| Notts County | 1–2 | 1–3 | 1–1 | 1–1 | 6–0 | 2–0 | 2–0 | 2–1 | 3–1 | 3–1 | 3–3 | 0–3 | 0–0 | 6–2 | 3–0 | | 3–0 | 1–3 | 1–2 | 0–0 | 1–0 | 0–2 |
| Queens Park Rangers | 5–0 | 2–0 | 3–2 | 4–1 | 4–0 | 5–1 | 4–0 | 0–0 | 3–0 | 3–1 | 5–2 | 0–0 | 2–3 | 1–1 | 0–1 | 2–2 | | 0–1 | 2–1 | 5–1 | 2–1 | 3–1 |
| Reading | 3–1 | 0–2 | 3–0 | 5–2 | 3–2 | 4–1 | 4–1 | 2–1 | 0–1 | 2–0 | 1–0 | 2–1 | 3–1 | 2–1 | 5–2 | 3–1 | 1–2 | | 2–1 | 2–0 | 2–0 | 3–0 |
| Southend | 2–2 | 3–3 | 0–0 | 0–1 | 1–1 | 3–1 | 2–1 | 0–0 | 7–1 | 4–0 | 4–2 | 0–1 | 6–0 | 1–2 | 0–1 | 0–0 | 0–1 | 1–2 | | 1–0 | 2–1 | 1–1 |
| Swindon Town | 3–2 | 2–3 | 1–2 | 1–1 | 3–0 | 2–1 | 2–2 | 1–2 | 0–2 | 1–1 | 3–0 | 3–0 | 3–1 | 1–1 | 3–1 | 2–1 | 2–2 | 4–1 | 1–3 | | 4–1 | 1–6 |
| Torquay United | 3–1 | 0–2 | 1–0 | 2–0 | 2–0 | 2–1 | 1–0 | 3–3 | 3–2 | 2–1 | 4–2 | 2–1 | 1–3 | 3–2 | 3–3 | 0–1 | 4–2 | 0–0 | 1–1 | 2–1 | | 2–1 |
| Watford | 0–0 | 4–1 | 2–1 | 0–2 | 1–2 | 4–0 | 1–1 | 5–0 | 3–2 | 1–0 | 1–2 | 1–3 | 2–1 | 2–5 | 4–1 | 1–2 | 2–1 | 4–2 | 5–0 | 2–1 | 2–2 | |

Updated to match(es) played on unknown. Source: Ian Laschke: Rothmans Book of Football League Records 1888–89 to 1978–79. Macdonald and Jane's, London & Sydney, 1980.
Legend: Blue = home team win; Yellow = draw; Red = away team win.

=== Maps ===
Locations of the Football League Third Division South London teams
Locations of the Football League Third Division South teams

== Attendances ==
=== Division One ===
| # | Football club | Home games | Average attendance |
|---|---|---|---|
| 1 | Arsenal FC | 21 | 41,960 |
| 2 | Aston Villa | 21 | 40,864 |
| 3 | Chelsea FC | 21 | 34,977 |
| 4 | Manchester City | 21 | 33,577 |
| 5 | Sunderland AFC | 21 | 30,378 |
| 6 | Everton FC | 21 | 29,118 |
| 7 | Liverpool FC | 21 | 27,265 |
| 8 | Bolton Wanderers | 21 | 26,868 |
| 9 | Brentford FC | 21 | 25,287 |
| 10 | Wolverhampton Wanderers | 21 | 24,824 |
| 11 | Birmingham City | 21 | 24,501 |
| 12 | West Bromwich Albion | 21 | 23,110 |
| 13 | Stoke City | 21 | 21,586 |
| 14 | Derby County | 21 | 20,932 |
| 15 | Preston North End | 21 | 19,511 |
| 16 | Portsmouth FC | 21 | 19,358 |
| 17 | Middlesbrough FC | 21 | 18,771 |
| 18 | Leeds United | 21 | 18,617 |
| 19 | Sheffield Wednesday | 21 | 18,128 |
| 20 | Blackburn Rovers | 21 | 15,498 |
| 21 | Huddersfield Town | 21 | 15,097 |
| 22 | Grimsby Town | 21 | 11,496 |

=== Division Two ===
| # | Football club | Home games | Average attendance |
|---|---|---|---|
| 1 | Tottenham Hotspur FC | 21 | 33,183 |
| 2 | Manchester United | 21 | 26,070 |
| 3 | West Ham United FC | 21 | 25,468 |
| 4 | Charlton Athletic FC | 21 | 22,026 |
| 5 | Newcastle United FC | 21 | 19,483 |
| 6 | Sheffield United FC | 21 | 18,428 |
| 7 | Norwich City FC | 21 | 16,605 |
| 8 | Fulham FC | 21 | 16,562 |
| 9 | Plymouth Argyle FC | 21 | 16,310 |
| 10 | Leicester City FC | 21 | 15,126 |
| 11 | Doncaster Rovers FC | 21 | 14,122 |
| 12 | Blackpool FC | 21 | 13,729 |
| 13 | Nottingham Forest FC | 21 | 10,707 |
| 14 | Southampton FC | 21 | 10,705 |
| 15 | Burnley FC | 21 | 10,402 |
| 16 | Barnsley FC | 21 | 9,891 |
| 17 | Bradford Park Avenue AFC | 21 | 9,844 |
| 18 | Bury FC | 21 | 9,241 |
| 19 | Swansea City AFC | 21 | 8,966 |
| 20 | Bradford City AFC | 21 | 8,716 |
| 21 | Port Vale FC | 21 | 7,787 |
| 22 | Hull City AFC | 21 | 5,713 |

== See also ==
- 1935-36 in English football
- 1935 in association football
- 1936 in association football
