= Jack Liggins =

English footballer

Personal information
- Full name: John Granville Liggins
- Date of birth: 26 March 1906
- Place of birth: Altrincham, England
- Date of death: 27 February 1976 (aged 69)
- Position: Centre forward

Senior career*
Years	Team	Apps	(Gls)
1930?–1931?	Rotherham United	0	(0)
1932-1933	Mossley	10	(10)
1933	Hyde United	21	(37)
1934?–1935?	Leicester City	8	(5)
1935?–1936?	Burnley	4	(1)
1936-1937	Mossley	12	(6)
	Shrewsbury Town	?	(?)
	Worksop Town	?	(?)
	Bridlington Town	?	(?)
- * Club domestic league appearances and goals

John Granville Liggins (1906 – 1976) was an English-born footballer who played as a centre forward. He played in The Football League for Leicester City and Burnley.

In the 1934–35 season he scored four league goals for Leicester.
