= 1936–37 Football League =

45th season of the Football League

The Football League
- Season: 1936–37
- Champions: Manchester City

The 1936–37 season was the 45th season of The Football League. Manchester City became champions of England for the first time, whilst Charlton Athletic achieved their highest-ever league placing, finishing second in their first season in the top flight.

== First Division ==
First Division
- Season: 1936–37
- Champions: Manchester City; 1st English title
- Relegated: Manchester United; Sheffield Wednesday
- Matches: 462
- Goals: 1,555 (3.37 per match)
- Top goalscorer: Freddie Steele (33 goals)
- Biggest home win: Everton 7–0 Derby County (7 December 1936); Stoke City 10–3 West Bromwich Albion (4 February 1937)
- Biggest away win: Bolton Wanderers 0–5 Arsenal (1 January 1937); Derby County 0–5 Manchester City (24 February 1937); Liverpool 0–5 Manchester City (26 March 1937)
- Highest scoring: Stoke City 10–3 West Bromwich Albion (4 February 1937)

Pos	Team	Pld	W	D	L	GF	GA	GAv	Pts	Relegation
1	Manchester City (C)	42	22	13	7	107	61	1.754	57	
2	Charlton Athletic	42	21	12	9	58	49	1.184	54	
3	Arsenal	42	18	16	8	80	49	1.633	52	
4	Derby County	42	21	7	14	96	90	1.067	49	
5	Wolverhampton Wanderers	42	21	5	16	84	67	1.254	47	
6	Brentford	42	18	10	14	82	78	1.051	46	
7	Middlesbrough	42	19	8	15	74	71	1.042	46	
8	Sunderland	42	19	6	17	89	87	1.023	44	
9	Portsmouth	42	17	10	15	62	66	0.939	44	
10	Stoke City	42	15	12	15	72	57	1.263	42	
11	Birmingham	42	13	15	14	64	60	1.067	41	
12	Grimsby Town	42	17	7	18	86	81	1.062	41	
13	Chelsea	42	14	13	15	52	55	0.945	41	
14	Preston North End	42	14	13	15	56	67	0.836	41	
15	Huddersfield Town	42	12	15	15	62	64	0.969	39	
16	West Bromwich Albion	42	16	6	20	77	98	0.786	38	
17	Everton	42	14	9	19	81	78	1.038	37	
18	Liverpool	42	12	11	19	62	84	0.738	35	
19	Leeds United	42	15	4	23	60	80	0.750	34	
20	Bolton Wanderers	42	10	14	18	43	66	0.652	34	
21	Manchester United (R)	42	10	12	20	55	78	0.705	32	Relegation to the Second Division
22	Sheffield Wednesday (R)	42	9	12	21	53	69	0.768	30	Relegation to the Second Division

Source: World Football
Rules for classification: 1) Points; 2) Goal average; 3) Goals scored
(C) Champions; (R) Relegated

=== Results ===
Home \ Away	ARS	BIR	BOL	BRE	CHA	CHE	DER	EVE	GRI	HUD	LEE	LIV	MCI	MUN	MID	POR	PNE	SHW	STK	SUN	WBA	WOL
Arsenal		1–1	0–0	1–1	1–1	4–1	2–2	3–2	0–0	1–1	4–1	1–0	1–3	1–1	5–3	4–0	4–1	1–1	0–0	4–1	2–0	3–0
Birmingham	1–3		1–1	4–0	1–2	0–0	0–1	2–0	2–3	4–2	2–1	5–0	2–2	2–2	0–0	2–1	1–0	1–1	2–4	2–0	1–1	1–0
Bolton Wanderers	0–5	0–0		2–2	2–1	2–1	1–3	1–2	1–2	2–2	2–1	0–1	0–2	0–4	1–3	1–0	0–0	1–0	0–0	1–1	4–1	1–2
Brentford	2–0	2–1	2–2		4–2	1–0	6–2	2–2	2–3	1–1	4–1	5–2	2–6	4–0	4–1	4–0	1–1	2–1	2–1	3–3	2–1	3–2
Charlton Athletic	0–2	2–2	1–0	2–1		1–0	2–0	2–0	1–0	1–0	1–0	1–1	1–1	3–0	2–2	0–0	3–1	1–0	2–0	3–1	4–2	4–0
Chelsea	2–0	1–3	0–1	2–1	3–0		1–1	4–0	3–2	0–0	2–1	2–0	4–4	4–2	1–0	1–1	0–0	1–1	1–0	1–3	3–0	0–1
Derby County	5–4	3–1	3–0	2–3	5–0	1–1		3–1	3–1	3–3	5–3	4–1	0–5	5–4	0–2	1–3	1–2	3–2	2–2	3–0	1–0	5–1
Everton	1–1	3–3	3–2	3–0	2–2	0–0	7–0		3–0	2–1	7–1	2–0	1–1	2–3	2–3	4–0	2–2	3–1	1–1	3–0	4–2	1–0
Grimsby Town	1–3	1–1	3–1	2–0	0–1	3–0	3–4	1–0		2–2	4–1	2–1	5–3	6–2	5–1	1–0	6–4	5–1	1–3	6–0	2–3	1–1
Huddersfield Town	0–0	1–1	2–0	1–1	1–2	4–2	2–0	0–3	0–3		3–0	4–0	1–1	3–1	2–0	1–2	4–2	1–0	2–1	2–1	1–1	4–0
Leeds United	3–4	0–2	2–2	3–1	2–0	2–3	2–0	3–0	2–0	2–1		2–0	1–1	2–1	5–0	3–1	1–0	1–1	2–1	3–0	3–1	0–1
Liverpool	2–1	2–0	0–0	2–2	1–2	1–1	3–3	3–2	7–1	1–1	3–0		0–5	2–0	0–2	0–0	1–1	2–2	2–1	4–0	1–2	1–0
Manchester City	2–0	1–1	2–2	2–1	1–1	0–0	3–2	4–1	1–1	3–0	4–0	5–1		1–0	2–1	3–1	4–1	4–1	2–1	2–4	6–2	4–1
Manchester United	2–0	1–2	1–0	1–3	0–0	0–0	2–2	2–1	1–1	3–1	0–0	2–5	3–2		2–1	0–1	1–1	1–1	2–1	2–1	2–2	1–1
Middlesbrough	1–1	3–1	2–0	3–0	1–1	2–0	1–3	2–0	0–0	5–0	4–2	3–3	2–0	3–2		2–2	2–1	2–0	1–0	5–5	4–1	1–0
Portsmouth	1–5	2–1	1–1	1–3	0–1	4–1	1–2	2–2	2–1	1–0	3–0	6–2	2–1	2–1	2–1		0–1	1–0	1–0	3–2	5–3	1–1
Preston North End	1–3	2–2	1–2	1–1	0–0	1–0	5–2	1–0	3–2	1–1	1–0	3–1	2–5	3–1	2–0	1–1		1–1	0–1	2–0	3–2	1–3
Sheffield Wednesday	0–0	0–3	2–0	0–2	3–1	1–1	2–3	6–4	2–1	2–2	1–2	1–2	5–1	1–0	1–0	0–0	0–1		0–0	2–0	2–3	1–3
Stoke City	0–0	2–0	2–2	5–1	1–1	2–0	1–2	2–1	2–0	1–1	2–1	1–1	2–2	3–0	6–2	2–4	0–2	1–0		5–3	10–3	2–1
Sunderland	1–1	4–0	3–0	4–1	1–0	2–3	3–2	3–1	5–1	3–2	2–1	4–2	1–3	1–1	4–1	3–2	3–0	2–1	3–0		1–0	6–2
West Bromwich Albion	2–4	3–2	0–2	1–0	1–2	2–0	1–3	2–1	4–2	2–1	3–0	3–1	2–2	1–0	3–1	3–1	0–0	2–3	2–2	6–4		2–1
Wolverhampton Wanderers	2–0	2–1	2–3	4–0	6–1	1–2	3–1	7–2	5–2	3–1	3–0	2–0	2–1	3–1	0–1	1–1	5–0	4–3	2–1	1–1	5–2	

Updated to match(es) played on unknown. Source:
Legend: Blue = home team win; Yellow = draw; Red = away team win.

=== Maps ===
Locations of the Football League First Division London teams
Locations of the Football League First Division teams

== Second Division ==
Second Division
- Season: 1936–37
- Champions: Leicester City
- Promoted: Leicester City; Blackpool
- Relegated: Bradford City; Doncaster Rovers
- Matches: 462
- Goals: 1,479 (3.2 per match)
- Top goalscorer: Jack Bowers (33 goals)
- Biggest home win: Blackburn Rovers 9–1 Nottingham Forest (10 April 1937)
- Biggest away win: Norwich City 1–5 Newcastle United (28 December 1936); 0–4: seven matches
- Highest scoring: Leicester City 7–3 Burnley (13 March 1937)

Pos	Team	Pld	W	D	L	GF	GA	GAv	Pts	Promotion or relegation
1	Leicester City (C, P)	42	24	8	10	89	57	1.561	56	Promotion to the First Division
2	Blackpool (P)	42	24	7	11	88	53	1.660	55	Promotion to the First Division
3	Bury	42	22	8	12	74	55	1.345	52	
4	Newcastle United	42	22	5	15	80	56	1.429	49	
5	Plymouth Argyle	42	18	13	11	71	53	1.340	49	
6	West Ham United	42	19	11	12	73	55	1.327	49	
7	Sheffield United	42	18	10	14	66	54	1.222	46	
8	Coventry City	42	17	11	14	66	54	1.222	45	
9	Aston Villa	42	16	12	14	82	70	1.171	44	
10	Tottenham Hotspur	42	17	9	16	88	66	1.333	43	
11	Fulham	42	15	13	14	71	61	1.164	43	
12	Blackburn Rovers	42	16	10	16	70	62	1.129	42	
13	Burnley	42	16	10	16	57	61	0.934	42	
14	Barnsley	42	16	9	17	50	64	0.781	41	
15	Chesterfield	42	16	8	18	84	89	0.944	40	
16	Swansea Town	42	15	7	20	50	65	0.769	37	
17	Norwich City	42	14	8	20	63	71	0.887	36	
18	Nottingham Forest	42	12	10	20	68	90	0.756	34	
19	Southampton	42	11	12	19	53	77	0.688	34	
20	Bradford (Park Avenue)	42	12	9	21	52	88	0.591	33	
21	Bradford City (R)	42	9	12	21	54	94	0.574	30	Relegation to the Third Division North
22	Doncaster Rovers (R)	42	7	10	25	30	84	0.357	24	Relegation to the Third Division North

Rules for classification: 1) Points; 2) Goal average; 3) Goals scored
(C) Champions; (P) Promoted; (R) Relegated

=== Results ===
Home \ Away	AST	BAR	BLB	BLP	BRA	BPA	BUR	BRY	CHF	COV	DON	FUL	LEI	NEW	NWC	NOT	PLY	SHU	SOU	SWA	TOT	WHU
Aston Villa		4–2	2–2	4–0	5–1	4–1	0–0	0–4	6–2	0–0	1–1	0–3	1–3	0–2	3–0	1–1	5–4	2–1	4–0	4–0	1–1	0–2
Barnsley	0–4		3–2	2–1	1–1	2–1	1–1	2–2	1–1	3–0	4–1	1–0	1–2	1–0	2–1	1–0	1–3	1–1	2–1	0–1	1–0	0–0
Blackburn Rovers	3–4	1–1		2–0	3–0	1–1	3–1	2–3	5–2	2–5	2–0	0–2	0–0	6–1	1–0	9–1	2–3	3–1	1–0	2–1	0–4	1–2
Blackpool	2–3	1–1	2–0		4–2	6–0	2–0	1–2	0–1	3–0	1–1	3–1	6–2	3–0	0–2	7–1	1–1	1–0	2–0	3–2	0–0	1–0
Bradford City	2–2	3–2	2–2	1–4		2–3	1–3	0–1	2–2	1–0	0–0	1–1	1–2	2–0	2–0	2–1	1–1	3–2	2–2	4–0	2–2	2–1
Bradford Park Avenue	3–3	2–1	1–2	2–1	2–1		2–0	0–1	4–5	1–3	1–0	1–1	1–2	0–3	1–0	3–2	0–0	0–3	3–1	1–1	3–2	2–1
Burnley	1–2	3–0	0–0	3–0	3–0	2–2		1–2	3–1	3–3	3–0	0–2	0–0	0–3	3–0	3–0	2–0	1–0	1–3	0–0	3–1	2–1
Bury	2–1	2–1	1–1	2–3	5–0	3–1	3–1		4–0	0–4	4–2	1–1	0–1	1–2	3–2	1–1	2–0	2–0	2–1	2–0	5–3	1–1
Chesterfield	1–0	2–1	0–4	0–4	7–1	4–2	4–1	1–1		2–3	5–1	4–1	2–5	4–0	3–1	4–2	0–1	2–2	3–0	4–0	1–3	1–1
Coventry City	1–0	3–0	0–1	1–2	3–1	4–0	0–1	1–3	2–1		1–1	1–1	0–2	2–2	1–1	2–2	2–0	2–0	2–0	2–1	1–0	4–0
Doncaster Rovers	1–0	0–1	0–1	0–4	1–1	1–3	2–0	1–0	0–4	1–1		2–1	0–0	1–2	1–2	0–2	2–1	1–1	2–0	0–0	1–1	1–4
Fulham	3–2	1–0	1–1	0–3	0–1	0–0	2–0	1–1	1–0	0–2	1–0		2–0	3–4	2–3	5–2	2–2	4–0	2–0	5–0	3–3	5–0
Leicester City	1–0	5–1	1–0	1–2	4–1	5–0	7–3	0–3	3–1	1–0	7–1	2–0		3–2	2–2	2–1	3–2	1–2	2–2	0–0	4–1	2–2
Newcastle United	0–2	0–1	2–0	1–2	2–0	1–1	3–0	1–3	1–2	4–2	7–0	1–1	1–0		0–1	3–2	1–1	4–0	3–0	5–1	0–1	5–3
Norwich City	5–1	0–1	0–0	1–2	0–0	3–1	2–2	0–0	2–0	0–3	2–1	3–0	1–2	1–5		4–0	1–2	1–1	4–2	3–0	2–3	3–3
Nottingham Forest	1–1	4–1	2–0	1–1	2–1	3–2	1–2	1–0	2–2	1–1	2–1	5–3	0–3	0–2	3–4		2–3	1–1	1–1	6–1	3–0	1–0
Plymouth Argyle	2–2	1–2	2–0	1–3	4–4	2–0	0–1	3–0	1–1	1–0	7–0	0–3	2–1	1–1	2–0	4–1		2–0	3–1	0–0	2–2	2–0
Sheffield United	5–1	2–0	0–1	2–2	3–1	3–0	1–1	1–0	5–0	2–2	3–1	2–0	3–1	2–1	2–0	4–1	2–0		0–0	1–0	3–2	2–0
Southampton	2–2	1–3	2–2	5–2	2–0	0–0	1–1	4–1	3–2	1–1	1–0	3–3	1–1	2–0	3–1	0–3	0–0	4–0		2–1	1–0	0–2
Swansea Town	1–2	3–1	1–0	1–1	3–0	3–0	3–0	2–0	4–1	2–0	0–1	3–0	1–3	1–2	2–1	1–0	0–1	2–1	5–1		2–1	0–0
Tottenham Hotspur	2–2	3–0	5–1	1–2	5–1	5–1	3–0	2–0	5–1	3–1	2–0	1–1	4–2	0–1	2–3	2–1	1–3	2–2	4–0	3–1		2–3
West Ham United	2–1	0–0	3–1	3–0	4–1	1–0	0–2	5–1	1–1	4–0	1–0	3–3	4–1	0–2	4–1	2–2	1–1	1–0	4–0	2–0	2–1	

Updated to match(es) played on unknown. Source: Ian Laschke: Rothmans Book of Football League Records 1888–89 to 1978–79. Macdonald and Jane’s, London & Sydney, 1980.
Legend: Blue = home team win; Yellow = draw; Red = away team win.

=== Maps ===
Locations of the Football League Second Division London teams
Locations of the Football League Second Division teams

== Third Division North ==
Football League Third Division North
- Season: 1936–1937
- Champions: Stockport County
- Promoted: Stockport County
- Failed re-election: None
- Matches: 462
- Goals: 1,602 (3.47 per match)
- Top goalscorer: Ted Harston (Mansfield Town), 55

Pos	Team	Pld	W	D	L	GF	GA	GAv	Pts	Promotion or relegation
1	Stockport County (C, P)	42	23	14	5	84	39	2.154	60	Promotion to the Second Division
2	Lincoln City	42	25	7	10	103	57	1.807	57	
3	Chester	42	22	9	11	87	57	1.526	53	
4	Oldham Athletic	42	20	11	11	77	59	1.305	51	
5	Hull City	42	17	12	13	68	69	0.986	46	
6	Hartlepools United	42	19	7	16	75	69	1.087	45	
7	Halifax Town	42	18	9	15	68	63	1.079	45	
8	Wrexham	42	16	12	14	71	57	1.246	44	
9	Mansfield Town	42	18	8	16	91	76	1.197	44	Transferred to the Third Division South
10	Carlisle United	42	18	8	16	65	68	0.956	44	
11	Port Vale	42	17	10	15	58	64	0.906	44	
12	York City	42	16	11	15	79	70	1.129	43	
13	Accrington Stanley	42	16	9	17	76	69	1.101	41	
14	Southport	42	12	13	17	73	87	0.839	37	
15	New Brighton	42	13	11	18	55	70	0.786	37	
16	Barrow	42	13	10	19	70	86	0.814	36	
17	Rotherham United	42	14	7	21	78	91	0.857	35	
18	Rochdale	42	13	9	20	69	86	0.802	35	
19	Tranmere Rovers	42	12	9	21	71	88	0.807	33	
20	Crewe Alexandra	42	10	12	20	55	83	0.663	32	
21	Gateshead	42	11	10	21	63	98	0.643	32	Re-elected
22	Darlington	42	8	14	20	66	96	0.688	30	Re-elected

Source: rsssf.com
Rules for classification: 1) Points; 2) Goal average; 3) Goals scored
(C) Champions; (P) Promoted

=== Results ===
Home \ Away	ACC	BRW	CRL	chs	CRE	DAR	GAT	HAL	HAR	HUL	LIN	MAN	NWB	OLD	PTV	ROC	ROT	SOU	STP	TRA	WRE	YOR
Accrington Stanley		5–0	2–1	2–1	4–1	1–0	2–1	3–2	1–2	0–1	1–2	0–3	5–0	1–1	2–3	3–1	3–0	6–3	2–1	4–0	2–2	2–1
Barrow	1–0		5–0	1–2	2–2	1–0	3–0	1–2	3–1	2–3	0–4	2–2	2–1	1–2	3–1	3–0	5–1	2–1	0–0	2–0	1–1	2–2
Carlisle United	2–0	2–2		1–1	4–0	2–0	2–1	1–2	2–0	1–1	3–1	1–2	1–1	2–1	5–2	1–0	4–1	1–1	1–0	3–1	2–1	1–1
Chester	1–1	6–0	4–0		5–0	2–1	6–0	1–1	3–0	3–1	7–3	5–1	4–1	2–1	0–0	2–2	2–1	2–3	1–1	5–2	4–1	3–1
Crewe Alexandra	2–2	4–1	1–2	1–1		1–1	3–1	0–1	1–1	2–1	2–1	2–1	0–2	1–2	0–1	2–2	0–2	3–2	1–2	2–2	1–1	2–2
Darlington	4–1	2–4	1–5	1–3	0–3		0–2	3–3	5–5	2–2	2–2	0–0	1–2	0–3	1–0	4–1	6–3	4–2	1–1	3–2	1–1	1–1
Gateshead	1–1	1–1	1–0	1–1	2–0	5–0		0–2	2–2	6–3	0–5	3–3	1–1	0–3	0–1	3–1	2–1	5–4	0–0	4–0	0–0	3–2
Halifax Town	3–0	2–1	6–1	1–0	4–1	4–1	2–1		2–0	1–0	2–3	0–0	0–0	0–1	0–1	3–2	4–1	1–1	1–1	2–1	1–2	1–2
Hartlepool	1–0	3–1	3–0	0–1	4–1	1–3	6–1	5–3		2–2	3–1	3–0	5–0	1–0	2–0	4–1	0–2	2–0	2–4	2–1	2–0	2–0
Hull City	0–3	3–2	1–1	1–1	2–0	4–3	3–2	0–0	1–0		1–1	3–0	4–1	2–0	1–1	1–1	2–1	3–2	0–1	5–2	1–0	1–0
Lincoln City	3–3	6–0	3–0	3–0	2–4	4–3	4–0	4–1	3–0	5–0		2–0	1–0	2–0	1–0	5–3	3–0	4–1	0–2	1–0	6–2	3–1
Mansfield Town	2–1	2–1	1–4	5–0	1–4	3–1	3–2	3–0	8–2	5–2	2–2		2–3	1–2	7–1	6–2	4–1	3–0	0–2	2–3	3–0	1–2
New Brighton	1–1	1–1	1–1	1–0	1–0	2–0	1–1	1–1	4–0	1–1	1–2	0–0		0–2	2–0	5–1	4–0	3–1	1–1	1–2	1–0	4–1
Oldham Athletic	3–1	4–3	2–1	1–0	1–1	1–1	4–4	1–0	2–0	3–1	1–0	1–1	3–1		5–1	3–0	4–1	3–3	0–2	3–0	2–2	2–2
Port Vale	1–1	3–2	1–0	4–0	0–0	2–2	4–2	3–1	1–0	1–3	1–1	5–1	3–1	1–0		1–1	2–1	0–2	3–0	2–1	0–3	1–1
Rochdale	4–1	3–1	3–0	0–1	2–0	4–0	0–2	3–5	1–1	4–0	2–3	1–3	4–0	3–0	0–0		1–0	2–1	2–2	2–1	0–6	3–0
Rotherham United	2–2	4–1	0–1	2–1	3–2	2–4	3–0	6–0	2–4	0–0	3–1	4–1	3–0	4–4	2–0	1–1		3–0	1–1	3–1	2–2	2–2
Southport	3–1	3–3	2–1	1–2	1–1	0–0	3–0	2–1	1–1	1–4	2–1	3–2	3–0	2–0	3–3	1–1	4–1		1–1	1–0	1–1	1–4
Stockport County	3–2	4–1	1–2	4–0	1–0	3–3	4–2	0–0	1–1	3–1	2–0	3–1	3–1	4–1	1–0	3–0	4–2	2–1		5–0	2–0	6–0
Tranmere	1–2	0–0	5–1	5–0	6–1	1–1	6–1	2–1	1–0	2–1	2–2	0–2	3–2	3–3	4–2	4–3	1–2	3–3	2–2		1–1	0–0
Wrexham	1–0	2–1	1–0	1–2	5–0	4–0	6–0	0–2	0–1	2–1	0–3	2–3	4–1	1–1	1–0	0–1	4–2	3–3	0–0	2–0		2–0
York City	4–2	1–2	5–2	0–2	2–3	3–0	2–0	4–0	4–1	1–1	0–0	1–1	2–1	3–1	1–2	4–1	4–3	4–0	2–1	4–0	3–4	

Updated to match(es) played on unknown. Source: Ian Laschke: Rothmans Book of Football League Records 1888–89 to 1978–79. Macdonald and Jane’s, London & Sydney, 1980.
Legend: Blue = home team win; Yellow = draw; Red = away team win.

=== Maps ===
Locations of the Football League Third Division North teams

== Third Division South ==
Football League Third Division South
- Season: 1936–1937
- Champions: Luton Town
- Promoted: Luton Town
- Failed re-election: None
- Matches: 462
- Goals: 1,497 (3.24 per match)
- Top goalscorer: Joe Payne (Luton Town), 55

Pos	Team	Pld	W	D	L	GF	GA	GAv	Pts	Promotion or relegation
1	Luton Town (C, P)	42	27	4	11	103	53	1.943	58	Promotion to the Second Division
2	Notts County	42	23	10	9	74	52	1.423	56	
3	Brighton & Hove Albion	42	24	5	13	74	43	1.721	53	
4	Watford	42	19	11	12	85	60	1.417	49	
5	Reading	42	19	11	12	76	60	1.267	49	
6	Bournemouth & Boscombe Athletic	42	20	9	13	65	59	1.102	49	
7	Northampton Town	42	20	6	16	85	68	1.250	46	
8	Millwall	42	18	10	14	64	54	1.185	46	
9	Queens Park Rangers	42	18	9	15	73	52	1.404	45	
10	Southend United	42	17	11	14	78	67	1.164	45	
11	Gillingham	42	18	8	16	52	66	0.788	44	
12	Clapton Orient	42	14	15	13	52	52	1.000	43	
13	Swindon Town	42	14	11	17	75	73	1.027	39	
14	Crystal Palace	42	13	12	17	62	61	1.016	38	
15	Bristol Rovers	42	16	4	22	71	80	0.888	36	
16	Bristol City	42	15	6	21	58	70	0.829	36	
17	Walsall	42	13	10	19	63	85	0.741	36	
18	Cardiff City	42	14	7	21	54	87	0.621	35	
19	Newport County	42	12	10	20	67	98	0.684	34	
20	Torquay United	42	11	10	21	57	80	0.713	32	
21	Exeter City	42	10	12	20	59	88	0.670	32	Re-elected
22	Aldershot	42	7	9	26	50	89	0.562	23	Re-elected

Rules for classification: 1) Points; 2) Goal average; 3) Goals scored
(C) Champions; (P) Promoted

=== Results ===
Home \ Away	ALD	B&BA	B&HA	BRI	BRR	CAR	CLA	CRY	EXE	GIL	LUT	MIL	NPC	NOR	NTC	QPR	REA	STD	SWI	TOR	WAL	WAT
Aldershot		1–3	0–1	3–0	4–0	0–1	1–1	2–2	1–1	3–0	2–3	1–2	2–0	0–2	0–1	0–0	0–2	1–2	2–1	0–1	4–4	2–2
Bournemouth & Boscombe Athletic	2–1		1–0	0–0	3–0	0–2	2–1	3–1	0–0	1–0	2–1	2–1	5–0	3–2	1–0	3–1	2–1	1–0	5–2	3–3	3–2	3–2
Brighton & Hove Albion	1–0	1–0		2–0	5–2	7–2	1–1	1–0	1–0	4–0	2–1	2–2	2–0	1–2	2–2	4–1	1–1	1–0	2–0	5–1	3–0	1–1
Bristol City	3–0	4–1	1–0		4–1	2–1	4–0	1–0	2–1	2–0	2–3	2–0	3–1	0–1	1–1	3–2	1–2	0–1	1–2	4–1	0–0	2–2
Bristol Rovers	1–0	4–0	2–0	3–1		5–1	4–0	1–0	4–2	0–3	4–0	2–1	1–1	2–0	2–3	1–1	2–2	1–2	2–1	5–1	3–0	0–1
Cardiff City	4–1	2–1	1–2	3–1	3–1		2–1	1–1	3–1	2–0	3–0	0–1	0–1	2–1	0–2	2–0	1–1	1–1	1–2	0–2	2–2	2–2
Clapton Orient	1–1	2–1	2–0	0–0	2–1	0–1		1–1	1–0	2–0	0–2	1–0	1–2	3–1	1–1	0–0	3–2	3–0	1–1	2–0	2–2	1–1
Crystal Palace	3–0	2–2	2–0	1–0	3–0	2–2	2–3		8–0	1–1	0–4	1–0	6–1	2–2	1–2	0–0	3–1	1–1	2–0	0–0	3–1	2–0
Exeter City	1–2	1–1	0–4	3–0	3–2	3–1	0–2	3–2		1–1	2–4	1–1	3–1	2–5	1–3	0–3	2–0	2–2	1–1	2–1	3–0	2–1
Gillingham	1–2	1–0	1–0	5–3	1–0	0–0	0–2	2–0	2–2		1–0	1–0	4–4	2–0	3–0	0–0	2–1	1–0	4–1	1–0	2–2	2–1
Luton Town	5–2	1–0	2–1	4–0	2–0	8–1	2–0	5–2	2–2	5–2		5–0	5–0	3–2	2–1	0–1	4–0	1–0	5–1	2–0	2–0	4–1
Millwall	4–2	0–2	3–0	3–1	1–2	3–1	2–1	3–0	3–3	3–0	0–2		7–2	1–0	0–0	2–0	0–2	1–2	1–1	1–1	3–1	2–1
Newport County	4–0	4–0	1–4	0–0	2–2	2–3	1–1	1–1	2–0	0–0	2–1	1–2		1–3	2–0	1–2	3–0	6–2	1–1	1–1	1–2	1–3
Northampton Town	5–3	0–0	2–0	5–1	4–1	2–0	1–1	2–0	2–1	5–0	3–1	2–2	3–2		1–1	0–1	2–1	4–3	4–0	3–0	6–3	0–1
Notts County	3–0	4–3	0–1	1–0	4–3	4–0	0–0	0–1	3–1	2–0	2–1	1–1	3–1	3–2		1–2	1–0	2–1	3–2	2–0	3–3	2–1
Queens Park Rangers	3–0	1–2	2–3	5–0	2–1	6–0	2–1	1–3	4–0	0–1	2–1	0–1	6–2	3–2	0–2		0–0	7–2	1–1	3–0	2–0	1–2
Reading	2–0	3–2	2–0	2–1	2–0	3–0	1–1	1–1	1–0	6–2	2–2	3–0	4–4	3–1	4–1	2–0		2–3	2–2	5–1	0–2	3–0
Southend	2–2	0–0	2–1	3–0	2–3	8–1	0–0	2–1	4–4	0–2	3–0	0–0	9–2	2–0	2–3	3–2	1–1		2–0	0–0	3–0	1–1
Swindon Town	5–1	3–1	1–2	0–1	4–1	4–2	1–3	4–0	3–1	3–0	2–2	3–0	1–2	2–0	2–2	1–1	1–2	4–0		4–2	3–0	1–1
Torquay United	5–1	0–0	0–2	5–2	1–0	1–0	4–1	3–0	0–1	0–2	2–2	0–2	1–2	5–0	2–2	1–1	2–2	1–4	2–0		3–1	4–7
Walsall	0–0	1–1	1–4	1–5	5–2	1–0	3–2	1–0	4–2	2–1	0–1	0–3	1–2	2–2	2–1	2–4	0–1	3–0	5–2	1–0		3–1
Watford	5–3	4–0	1–0	1–0	3–0	2–0	2–1	3–1	1–1	6–1	1–3	2–2	3–0	4–1	0–2	2–0	6–1	1–3	2–2	4–0	0–0	

Updated to match(es) played on unknown. Source: Ian Laschke: Rothmans Book of Football League Records 1888–89 to 1978–79. Macdonald and Jane’s, London & Sydney, 1980.
Legend: Blue = home team win; Yellow = draw; Red = away team win.

=== Maps ===
Locations of the Football League Third Division South London teams
Locations of the Football League Third Division South teams

== Attendances ==
=== Division One ===
No.	Club	Average
1	Arsenal FC	43,353
2	Manchester City FC	35,872
3	Chelsea FC	32,414
4	Manchester United	32,332
5	Charlton Athletic FC	31,086
6	Everton FC	30,292
7	Sunderland AFC	28,670
8	Brentford FC	24,544
9	Liverpool FC	23,798
10	Wolverhampton Wanderers FC	23,787
11	Birmingham City FC	22,991
12	Bolton Wanderers FC	22,518
13	Middlesbrough FC	22,390
14	Stoke City FC	22,261
15	West Bromwich Albion FC	21,742
16	Derby County FC	20,475
17	Portsmouth FC	19,692
18	Sheffield Wednesday FC	19,530
19	Leeds United FC	18,199
20	Preston North End FC	18,045
21	Huddersfield Town AFC	15,812
22	Grimsby Town FC	11,514

=== Division Two ===
No.	Club	Average
1	Aston Villa FC	37,537
2	Tottenham Hotspur FC	25,342
3	Newcastle United FC	24,430
4	Coventry City FC	22,744
5	Sheffield United FC	21,136
6	Plymouth Argyle FC	21,078
7	West Ham United FC	20,704
8	Leicester City FC	20,257
9	Blackpool FC	17,921
10	Fulham FC	17,457
11	Nottingham Forest FC	16,254
12	Norwich City FC	16,010
13	Blackburn Rovers FC	14,821
14	Chesterfield FC	13,139
15	Southampton FC	13,025
16	Bury FC	12,903
17	Burnley FC	12,041
18	Barnsley FC	12,039
19	Doncaster Rovers FC	11,697
20	Bradford Park Avenue AFC	10,422
21	Bradford City AFC	10,045
22	Swansea City AFC	9,880

== See also ==
- 1936–37 in English football
- 1936 in association football
- 1937 in association football
