= 1934–35 Football League =

43rd season of the Football League

The Football League
- Season: 1934–35
- Champions: Arsenal

The 1934–35 season was the 43rd season of The Football League.

== Final league tables ==
The tables and results below are reproduced here in the exact form that they can be found at The Rec.Sport.Soccer Statistics Foundation website and in Rothmans Book of Football League Records 1888–89 to 1978–79, with home and away statistics separated.

Beginning with the season 1894–95, clubs finishing level on points were separated according to goal average (goals scored divided by goals conceded), or more properly put, goal ratio. In case one or more teams had the same goal difference, this system favoured those teams who had scored fewer goals. The goal average system was eventually scrapped beginning with the 1976–77 season.

From the 1922–23 season, the bottom two teams of both Third Division North and Third Division South were required to apply for re-election.

== First Division ==
First Division
- Season: 1934–35
- Champions: Arsenal; 4th English title
- Relegated: Leicester City; Tottenham Hotspur
- Matches: 462
- Goals: 1,677 (3.63 per match)
- Top goalscorer: Ted Drake (42 goals)
- Biggest home win: Huddersfield Town 8–0 Liverpool (10 November 1934); Arsenal 8–0 Leicester City (15 December 1934); Arsenal 8–0 Middlesbrough (19 April 1935)
- Biggest away win: Tottenham Hotspur 0–6 Arsenal (6 March 1935)
- Highest scoring: Derby County 9–3 West Bromwich Albion (8 December 1934)

Pos	Team	Pld	W	D	L	GF	GA	GAv	Pts	Relegation
1	Arsenal (C)	42	23	12	7	115	46	2.500	58	
2	Sunderland	42	19	16	7	90	51	1.765	54	
3	Sheffield Wednesday	42	18	13	11	70	64	1.094	49	
4	Manchester City	42	20	8	14	82	67	1.224	48	
5	Grimsby Town	42	17	11	14	78	60	1.300	45	
6	Derby County	42	18	9	15	81	66	1.227	45	
7	Liverpool	42	19	7	16	85	88	0.966	45	
8	Everton	42	16	12	14	89	88	1.011	44	
9	West Bromwich Albion	42	17	10	15	83	83	1.000	44	
10	Stoke City	42	18	6	18	71	70	1.014	42	
11	Preston North End	42	15	12	15	62	67	0.925	42	
12	Chelsea	42	16	9	17	73	82	0.890	41	
13	Aston Villa	42	14	13	15	74	88	0.841	41	
14	Portsmouth	42	15	10	17	71	72	0.986	40	
15	Blackburn Rovers	42	14	11	17	66	78	0.846	39	
16	Huddersfield Town	42	14	10	18	76	71	1.070	38	
17	Wolverhampton Wanderers	42	15	8	19	88	94	0.936	38	
18	Leeds United	42	13	12	17	75	92	0.815	38	
19	Birmingham	42	13	10	19	63	81	0.778	36	
20	Middlesbrough	42	10	14	18	70	90	0.778	34	
21	Leicester City (R)	42	12	9	21	61	86	0.709	33	Relegation to the Second Division
22	Tottenham Hotspur (R)	42	10	10	22	54	93	0.581	30	Relegation to the Second Division

Source: World Football
Rules for classification: 1) Points; 2) Goal average; 3) Goals scored
(C) Champions; (R) Relegated

=== Results ===
Home \ Away	ARS	AST	BIR	BLB	CHE	DER	EVE	GRI	HUD	LEE	LEI	LIV	MCI	MID	POR	PNE	SHW	STK	SUN	TOT	WBA	WOL
Arsenal		1–2	5–1	4–0	2–2	0–1	2–0	1–1	1–0	3–0	8–0	8–1	3–0	8–0	1–1	5–3	4–1	2–0	0–0	5–1	4–3	7–0
Aston Villa	1–3		2–2	1–1	0–3	3–2	2–2	3–2	1–1	1–1	5–0	4–2	4–2	0–3	5–4	4–2	4–0	4–1	1–1	1–0	2–3	2–1
Birmingham	3–0	2–1		1–0	0–1	3–2	2–3	3–2	0–4	3–1	2–3	1–3	1–3	4–2	2–1	3–0	0–4	0–0	2–2	2–1	1–2	1–1
Blackburn Rovers	2–0	5–0	3–1		1–2	2–5	6–2	2–2	4–2	1–1	0–0	0–2	1–0	3–2	0–0	1–0	2–1	0–1	0–0	2–0	3–0	4–2
Chelsea	2–5	2–0	2–2	4–2		1–1	3–0	2–0	2–1	7–1	3–1	4–1	4–2	2–1	1–1	0–0	1–2	0–2	2–2	1–3	2–3	4–2
Derby County	3–1	1–1	1–1	1–1	3–0		4–1	1–4	4–1	1–2	1–1	1–2	1–2	2–0	0–1	0–3	4–0	0–2	3–1	2–1	9–3	2–0
Everton	0–2	2–2	2–0	5–2	3–2	2–2		3–1	4–2	4–4	2–1	1–0	1–2	1–1	3–2	4–1	2–2	5–0	6–2	5–2	4–0	5–2
Grimsby Town	2–2	5–1	4–3	1–2	3–1	1–3	0–0		1–1	3–2	3–1	3–2	1–1	2–2	3–0	3–1	3–1	3–1	0–0	3–0	3–0	2–1
Huddersfield Town	1–1	1–1	2–2	6–0	3–0	1–0	1–1	1–5		3–1	2–3	8–0	3–0	3–1	2–0	3–4	4–0	1–4	0–3	0–0	3–0	4–1
Leeds United	1–1	1–1	1–1	5–1	5–2	4–2	2–0	3–1	2–0		0–2	0–3	1–2	2–4	3–1	3–3	0–0	4–2	2–4	4–3	4–1	1–1
Leicester City	3–5	5–0	2–1	0–1	1–0	0–1	5–2	2–2	0–3	1–0		3–1	1–3	3–1	6–3	0–0	0–1	0–3	0–2	6–0	0–0	1–1
Liverpool	0–2	3–1	5–4	2–0	6–0	1–3	2–1	1–1	3–2	4–2	5–1		2–1	2–2	0–1	0–0	1–2	5–0	2–2	4–1	3–2	2–1
Manchester City	1–1	4–1	0–0	3–3	2–0	0–1	2–2	1–0	0–0	3–0	6–3	3–1		6–2	2–4	1–2	4–1	3–1	1–0	3–1	3–2	5–0
Middlesbrough	0–1	4–1	0–1	3–3	2–2	1–1	3–2	0–2	2–1	3–3	1–0	2–0	1–2		1–1	3–3	5–3	2–0	0–0	3–1	0–0	2–2
Portsmouth	3–3	0–1	2–1	3–1	1–1	5–1	5–1	1–0	5–0	0–0	1–1	1–2	4–2	1–0		4–0	2–1	0–1	2–4	1–1	0–2	0–1
Preston North End	2–1	0–0	0–1	3–1	2–0	0–1	2–2	1–0	2–0	0–2	2–0	2–2	2–4	2–0	1–1		2–1	5–2	1–1	1–0	1–2	2–1
Sheffield Wednesday	0–0	2–1	2–1	2–2	3–1	1–0	0–0	1–0	1–1	1–0	1–1	4–1	1–0	3–3	3–0	2–1		4–1	2–2	4–0	2–1	3–1
Stoke City	2–2	4–1	2–0	3–1	0–1	1–1	3–2	0–0	2–0	8–1	3–0	1–1	2–0	2–0	1–2	3–1	1–1		0–3	4–1	3–0	1–2
Sunderland	2–1	3–3	5–1	3–0	4–0	1–4	7–0	3–0	4–1	3–0	2–0	2–3	3–2	1–1	4–1	3–1	2–2	4–1		1–2	0–1	0–0
Tottenham Hotspur	0–6	0–2	1–1	1–0	1–3	2–2	1–1	2–1	0–0	1–1	2–2	5–1	0–0	3–1	4–1	1–2	3–2	3–2	1–1		0–1	3–1
West Bromwich Albion	0–3	2–2	1–2	2–2	2–2	4–3	0–1	4–2	4–1	6–3	4–1	1–1	1–1	6–3	4–2	0–0	1–1	3–0	1–1	4–0		5–2
Wolverhampton Wanderers	1–1	5–2	3–1	2–1	6–1	5–1	4–2	0–3	2–3	1–2	3–1	5–3	5–0	5–3	2–3	2–2	2–2	2–1	1–2	6–2	3–2	

Updated to match(es) played on unknown. Source:
Legend: Blue = home team win; Yellow = draw; Red = away team win.

=== Maps ===
Locations of the Football League First Division London teams
Locations of the Football League First Division teams

== Second Division ==
Second Division
- Season: 1934–35
- Champions: Brentford
- Promoted: Brentford; Bolton Wanderers
- Relegated: Oldham Athletic; Notts County
- Matches: 462
- Goals: 1,502 (3.25 per match)
- Top goalscorer: Jack Milsom (31 goals)
- Biggest home win: Bolton Wanderers 8–0 Barnsley (6 October 1934); Brentford 8–0 Port Vale (20 April 1935)
- Biggest away win: Oldham Athletic 0–5 Nottingham Forest (16 March 1935)
- Highest scoring: Plymouth Argyle 6–4 Hull City (29 April 1935)

Pos	Team	Pld	W	D	L	GF	GA	GAv	Pts	Promotion or relegation
1	Brentford (C, P)	42	26	9	7	93	48	1.938	61	Promotion to the First Division
2	Bolton Wanderers (P)	42	26	4	12	96	48	2.000	56	Promotion to the First Division
3	West Ham United	42	26	4	12	80	63	1.270	56	
4	Blackpool	42	21	11	10	79	57	1.386	53	
5	Manchester United	42	23	4	15	76	55	1.382	50	
6	Newcastle United	42	22	4	16	89	68	1.309	48	
7	Fulham	42	17	12	13	76	56	1.357	46	
8	Plymouth Argyle	42	19	8	15	75	64	1.172	46	
9	Nottingham Forest	42	17	8	17	76	70	1.086	42	
10	Bury	42	19	4	19	62	73	0.849	42	
11	Sheffield United	42	16	9	17	79	70	1.129	41	
12	Burnley	42	16	9	17	63	73	0.863	41	
13	Hull City	42	16	8	18	63	74	0.851	40	
14	Norwich City	42	14	11	17	71	61	1.164	39	
15	Bradford (Park Avenue)	42	11	16	15	55	63	0.873	38	
16	Barnsley	42	13	12	17	60	83	0.723	38	
17	Swansea Town	42	14	8	20	56	67	0.836	36	
18	Port Vale	42	11	12	19	55	74	0.743	34	
19	Southampton	42	11	12	19	46	75	0.613	34	
20	Bradford City	42	12	8	22	50	68	0.735	32	
21	Oldham Athletic (R)	42	10	6	26	56	95	0.589	26	Relegation to the Third Division North
22	Notts County (R)	42	9	7	26	46	97	0.474	25	Relegation to the Third Division South

Rules for classification: 1) Points; 2) Goal average; 3) Goals scored
(C) Champions; (P) Promoted; (R) Relegated

=== Results ===
Home \ Away	BAR	BLP	BOL	BRA	BPA	BRE	BUR	BRY	FUL	HUL	MUN	NEW	NWC	NOT	NTC	OLD	PLY	PTV	SHU	SOU	SWA	WHU
Barnsley		2–2	1–1	2–0	1–1	3–3	0–0	3–0	2–0	2–2	0–2	2–1	2–1	1–2	1–1	4–0	1–4	2–0	0–0	1–1	1–0	1–1
Blackpool	3–0		1–1	2–1	1–0	2–2	1–0	1–1	1–1	2–1	1–2	4–1	2–1	1–0	3–1	4–0	4–1	3–1	1–0	4–1	2–1	3–2
Bolton Wanderers	8–0	4–2		3–0	1–2	2–0	7–0	2–0	4–0	1–2	3–1	1–0	4–0	2–3	5–1	2–0	3–2	2–0	1–1	4–0	1–0	3–1
Bradford City	1–0	0–2	1–1		3–1	3–0	1–1	0–0	0–0	3–2	2–0	3–3	1–1	4–0	2–0	2–0	0–1	3–0	2–5	1–1	2–0	0–2
Bradford Park Avenue	3–2	0–0	4–0	2–1		2–3	1–1	2–1	0–0	1–2	1–2	1–3	1–1	1–1	0–0	2–0	2–2	1–1	1–3	3–1	3–1	1–3
Brentford	8–1	2–1	1–0	2–0	1–0		6–1	2–1	1–0	2–1	3–1	3–0	2–1	1–1	4–1	2–1	0–0	8–0	3–1	3–2	1–0	4–1
Burnley	4–1	1–2	2–1	2–0	1–2	0–3		3–3	3–1	1–3	1–2	0–3	1–0	2–1	4–0	4–2	1–2	2–2	0–2	3–0	3–0	5–2
Bury	4–1	1–5	2–1	2–1	2–4	4–1	0–0		2–0	0–1	0–1	0–2	1–0	1–0	1–0	2–0	2–1	3–1	3–1	4–1	2–1	2–4
Fulham	1–3	4–1	2–1	3–1	2–2	2–2	2–0	1–2		4–0	3–1	3–2	1–3	2–1	7–0	3–1	3–0	2–0	7–2	3–3	4–1	3–0
Hull City	1–1	2–2	0–2	1–0	2–0	2–1	1–3	0–1	1–2		3–2	1–1	1–0	5–0	5–1	1–1	1–1	1–0	0–3	0–0	0–1	4–0
Manchester United	4–1	3–2	0–3	2–0	2–0	0–0	3–4	1–0	1–0	3–0		0–1	5–0	3–2	2–1	4–0	3–1	2–1	3–3	3–0	3–1	3–1
Newcastle United	4–1	4–1	1–3	4–2	0–1	2–5	2–0	5–1	1–1	6–2	0–1		2–0	2–0	1–1	4–2	3–0	1–2	4–1	1–0	5–1	3–0
Norwich City	0–1	1–1	2–3	6–1	3–0	2–1	2–3	4–1	0–0	3–0	3–2	2–0		3–3	7–2	0–0	3–0	0–0	3–1	4–0	2–2	1–2
Nottingham Forest	4–1	0–0	0–1	2–0	2–2	0–0	5–0	1–4	1–1	2–1	2–2	5–1	5–2		2–3	4–0	1–3	2–0	2–1	3–1	1–0	2–0
Notts County	1–4	3–2	0–2	2–3	1–1	0–1	1–0	1–2	1–1	1–1	1–0	0–1	1–0	3–5		2–1	1–3	3–2	0–1	3–1	4–0	0–2
Oldham Athletic	1–4	2–3	1–4	3–1	1–1	1–3	1–2	7–2	2–1	5–0	3–1	3–2	4–2	0–5	1–0		1–1	2–0	3–2	0–2	2–2	1–2
Plymouth Argyle	3–1	1–2	1–0	3–1	2–2	1–1	2–2	3–0	3–1	6–4	0–2	1–3	0–1	5–2	4–0	2–0		2–1	2–0	4–0	3–2	0–1
Port Vale	4–0	2–2	1–3	1–0	1–1	2–2	3–1	0–1	1–1	1–2	3–2	1–3	1–1	2–0	5–3	2–0	2–2		2–0	4–1	2–1	2–2
Sheffield United	2–1	1–1	6–2	1–2	3–1	1–2	0–0	5–3	1–2	3–4	3–2	5–1	1–1	2–1	3–0	2–1	1–2	3–0		6–1	1–1	1–2
Southampton	0–1	2–0	1–2	1–1	4–1	1–0	0–0	2–1	1–1	3–0	1–0	2–0	1–4	1–2	1–1	2–2	1–0	0–0	1–1		1–0	2–2
Swansea Town	1–1	2–1	2–1	3–1	0–0	2–4	2–0	1–0	2–0	2–1	1–0	3–4	1–1	3–0	2–1	5–1	3–0	1–1	0–0	0–1		5–4
West Ham United	4–3	2–1	4–1	1–0	2–1	2–0	1–2	3–0	2–1	1–2	0–0	3–2	1–0	3–1	4–0	2–0	2–1	3–1	2–0	2–1	2–0	

Updated to match(es) played on unknown. Source: Ian Laschke: Rothmans Book of Football League Records 1888–89 to 1978–79. Macdonald and Jane’s, London & Sydney, 1980.
Legend: Blue = home team win; Yellow = draw; Red = away team win.

=== Maps ===
Locations of the Football League Second Division London teams
Locations of the Football League Second Division teams

== Third Division North ==
Football League Third Division North
- Season: 1934–1935
- Champions: Doncaster Rovers (1st title)
- Failed re-election: None
- Matches: 462
- Goals: 1,593 (3.45 per match)
- Top goalscorer: Gilbert Alsop (Walsall), 39

Pos	Team	Pld	W	D	L	GF	GA	GAv	Pts	Promotion
1	Doncaster Rovers (C, P)	42	26	5	11	87	44	1.977	57	Promotion to the Second Division
2	Halifax Town	42	25	5	12	76	67	1.134	55	
3	Chester	42	20	14	8	91	58	1.569	54	
4	Lincoln City	42	22	7	13	87	58	1.500	51	
5	Darlington	42	21	9	12	80	59	1.356	51	
6	Tranmere Rovers	42	20	11	11	74	55	1.345	51	
7	Stockport County	42	22	3	17	90	72	1.250	47	
8	Mansfield Town	42	19	9	14	75	62	1.210	47	
9	Rotherham United	42	19	7	16	86	73	1.178	45	
10	Chesterfield	42	17	10	15	71	52	1.365	44	
11	Wrexham	42	16	11	15	76	69	1.101	43	
12	Hartlepools United	42	17	7	18	80	78	1.026	41	
13	Crewe Alexandra	42	14	11	17	66	86	0.767	39	
14	Walsall	42	13	10	19	81	72	1.125	36	
15	York City	42	15	6	21	76	82	0.927	36	
16	New Brighton	42	14	8	20	59	76	0.776	36	
17	Barrow	42	13	9	20	58	87	0.667	35	
18	Accrington Stanley	42	12	10	20	63	89	0.708	34	
19	Gateshead	42	13	8	21	58	96	0.604	34	
20	Rochdale	42	11	11	20	53	71	0.746	33	
21	Southport	42	10	12	20	55	85	0.647	32	Re-elected
22	Carlisle United	42	8	7	27	51	102	0.500	23	Re-elected

Source: rsssf.com
(C) Champions; (P) Promoted

=== Results ===
Home \ Away	ACC	BRW	CRL	CHE	CHF	CRE	DAR	DON	GAT	HAL	HAR	LIN	MAN	NWB	ROC	ROT	SOU	STP	TRA	WAL	WRE	YOR
Accrington Stanley		5–2	1–0	1–1	1–0	3–0	2–1	1–5	4–2	1–1	0–4	3–0	2–0	1–3	2–5	2–3	1–1	3–1	1–0	3–3	2–2	5–2
Barrow	0–2		2–1	4–2	1–1	1–1	4–4	2–1	3–2	2–0	2–0	1–1	3–0	1–2	1–1	2–1	2–1	1–4	1–0	3–1	1–3	0–3
Carlisle United	2–0	0–0		1–3	3–1	1–3	1–2	1–1	5–4	2–4	2–2	2–1	1–1	4–1	0–0	2–1	0–1	1–2	1–1	1–6	0–2	4–0
Chester	4–0	6–2	3–0		1–1	2–2	3–1	1–3	2–2	5–0	4–1	0–1	3–2	5–4	1–0	4–1	0–2	5–1	0–0	2–1	6–2	5–1
Chesterfield	0–0	3–0	3–0	1–2		1–2	2–2	3–2	3–1	4–0	4–0	3–1	0–0	1–0	2–0	2–1	3–3	5–0	0–2	2–0	1–4	3–1
Crewe Alexandra	4–2	4–3	1–1	1–1	1–0		4–1	1–1	2–1	3–1	1–1	1–0	1–1	2–3	4–1	0–0	2–1	2–3	1–2	1–0	2–0	3–2
Darlington	5–0	3–1	5–0	1–0	2–1	6–2		1–1	2–1	0–1	3–0	4–1	1–0	1–0	2–2	4–0	0–0	0–0	2–2	3–2	3–1	2–0
Doncaster Rovers	2–1	2–0	3–0	3–0	0–2	2–0	2–0		5–0	0–1	3–1	1–3	2–1	7–1	1–0	3–5	2–0	3–4	2–0	4–0	2–1	4–1
Gateshead	1–1	1–0	3–2	2–4	1–4	5–2	3–0	0–0		3–1	2–1	0–2	2–2	2–1	2–0	1–1	1–2	3–2	0–2	1–0	1–0	2–1
Halifax Town	2–1	2–1	4–0	1–0	0–2	1–0	2–1	1–0	4–0		4–1	2–1	2–1	6–2	1–1	2–1	4–3	2–1	1–2	1–1	3–2	5–3
Hartlepool	4–2	5–2	5–2	0–2	1–1	4–2	0–1	2–1	1–2	0–3		1–5	1–1	2–2	0–0	3–1	4–1	4–0	6–1	2–1	4–3	3–1
Lincoln City	1–0	6–0	4–2	0–0	2–0	1–1	2–4	0–2	5–0	2–3	2–1		4–0	1–0	3–0	4–0	4–1	3–0	2–2	5–1	1–3	3–1
Mansfield Town	2–1	3–2	3–0	1–1	1–0	4–1	2–2	2–0	1–1	4–0	2–1	3–4		2–1	1–0	2–1	2–3	3–2	4–2	4–2	4–0	5–1
New Brighton	2–1	3–1	5–1	0–2	3–1	1–1	0–1	1–1	3–0	0–0	1–4	0–2	2–1		1–0	3–2	0–0	1–2	0–1	2–2	0–0	4–2
Rochdale	2–2	0–1	3–1	3–3	0–2	3–0	1–3	0–1	6–1	2–4	3–2	2–0	1–0	3–1		1–3	2–2	0–5	1–1	1–0	3–3	2–0
Rotherham United	2–0	0–0	4–1	6–1	2–2	2–2	2–1	1–3	3–0	2–2	0–1	5–0	3–0	1–2	4–0		4–2	2–0	3–1	4–2	2–0	4–1
Southport	0–0	0–2	0–3	1–1	1–1	2–1	1–4	1–2	1–1	1–2	1–1	3–3	1–2	2–1	2–1	0–3		1–2	4–0	3–2	2–1	0–3
Stockport County	5–1	4–1	2–0	0–1	4–2	4–0	3–0	3–2	5–1	2–1	3–2	1–2	0–2	1–1	3–1	4–0	6–1		1–0	0–3	6–1	0–0
Tranmere	2–1	2–1	3–1	1–1	2–1	5–1	4–1	0–2	2–2	1–0	3–0	2–1	3–0	0–1	4–1	3–3	4–1	3–1		4–0	1–1	4–0
Walsall	6–0	5–0	1–0	1–1	2–1	4–0	0–0	0–2	5–0	4–1	1–2	0–0	2–2	5–1	0–0	5–2	2–2	3–1	3–0		0–0	2–3
Wrexham	2–2	1–1	4–2	2–2	2–1	2–1	4–0	1–2	3–1	5–0	0–2	2–2	1–3	3–0	2–0	0–1	3–0	2–1	2–2	4–2		2–0
York City	5–2	1–1	7–0	1–1	1–1	7–3	2–1	1–2	3–0	0–1	3–1	1–2	2–1	1–0	0–1	5–0	3–1	3–1	0–0	4–1	0–0	

Updated to match(es) played on unknown. Source: Ian Laschke: Rothmans Book of Football League Records 1888–89 to 1978–79. Macdonald and Jane’s, London & Sydney, 1980.
Legend: Blue = home team win; Yellow = draw; Red = away team win.

=== Maps ===
Locations of the Football League Third Division North teams

== Third Division South ==
Football League Third Division South
- Season: 1934–1935
- Champions: Charlton Athletic (2nd title)
- Failed re-election: None
- Matches: 462
- Goals: 1,534 (3.32 per match)
- Top goalscorer: Ralph Allen (Charlton Athletic), 32

Pos	Team	Pld	W	D	L	GF	GA	GAv	Pts	Promotion
1	Charlton Athletic (C, P)	42	27	7	8	103	52	1.981	61	Promotion to the Second Division
2	Reading	42	21	11	10	89	65	1.369	53	
3	Coventry City	42	21	9	12	86	50	1.720	51	
4	Luton Town	42	19	12	11	92	60	1.533	50	
5	Crystal Palace	42	19	10	13	86	64	1.344	48	
6	Watford	42	19	9	14	76	49	1.551	47	
7	Northampton Town	42	19	8	15	65	67	0.970	46	
8	Bristol Rovers	42	17	10	15	73	77	0.948	44	
9	Brighton & Hove Albion	42	17	9	16	69	62	1.113	43	
10	Torquay United	42	18	6	18	81	75	1.080	42	
11	Exeter City	42	16	9	17	70	75	0.933	41	
12	Millwall	42	17	7	18	57	62	0.919	41	
13	Queens Park Rangers	42	16	9	17	63	72	0.875	41	
14	Clapton Orient	42	15	10	17	65	65	1.000	40	
15	Bristol City	42	15	9	18	52	68	0.765	39	
16	Swindon Town	42	13	12	17	67	78	0.859	38	
17	Bournemouth & Boscombe Athletic	42	15	7	20	54	71	0.761	37	
18	Aldershot	42	13	10	19	50	75	0.667	36	
19	Cardiff City	42	13	9	20	62	82	0.756	35	
20	Gillingham	42	11	13	18	55	75	0.733	35	
21	Southend United	42	11	9	22	65	78	0.833	31	Re-elected
22	Newport County	42	10	5	27	54	112	0.482	25	Re-elected

(C) Champions; (P) Promoted

=== Results ===
Home \ Away	ALD	B&BA	B&HA	BRI	BRR	CAR	CHA	CLA	COV	CRY	EXE	GIL	LUT	MIL	NPC	NOR	QPR	REA	STD	SWI	TOR	WAT
Aldershot		1–1	1–0	1–0	1–2	2–0	3–2	1–1	3–1	2–2	0–0	4–1	0–1	0–0	3–2	2–0	1–0	2–5	3–2	3–0	2–0	0–0
Bournemouth & Boscombe Athletic	4–1		1–0	1–1	3–0	3–1	2–2	1–0	0–2	1–1	3–2	1–1	1–3	3–1	3–1	0–1	0–2	4–1	2–1	1–1	1–2	1–2
Brighton & Hove Albion	3–0	2–0		2–0	3–1	3–1	2–1	3–0	2–0	3–0	6–0	1–1	4–1	0–2	3–1	2–3	5–1	1–0	2–2	2–2	0–0	2–0
Bristol City	2–0	2–1	1–0		1–1	4–0	1–4	0–0	0–2	0–1	2–0	3–1	0–2	4–2	2–1	1–1	5–1	1–0	2–0	2–0	1–0	3–1
Bristol Rovers	1–0	4–1	0–0	2–2		3–2	0–0	1–2	2–1	5–3	5–5	4–3	1–1	2–0	5–3	7–1	2–0	3–0	2–1	2–2	1–0	2–0
Cardiff City	1–1	2–1	0–0	3–3	4–1		2–1	3–0	2–4	2–0	5–0	0–2	1–0	3–1	3–4	2–2	2–1	1–1	2–0	1–3	1–1	2–1
Charlton Athletic	4–0	0–1	3–1	4–1	2–0	3–1		2–1	3–3	2–2	1–0	2–0	4–2	3–1	6–0	0–1	3–1	3–1	3–0	6–0	3–2	5–2
Clapton Orient	3–1	0–1	6–0	4–0	5–2	0–1	1–2		0–1	2–0	0–3	2–2	1–1	2–1	4–0	3–2	3–1	2–1	3–0	2–0	3–1	1–1
Coventry City	0–0	4–1	0–2	1–1	1–0	2–0	4–0	4–0		1–1	1–1	4–0	1–0	5–1	5–0	2–0	4–1	1–2	6–3	3–0	6–0	1–1
Crystal Palace	3–0	1–0	3–0	3–1	2–0	6–1	1–2	1–0	3–1		0–1	2–0	2–1	1–1	6–0	2–0	2–3	3–1	1–0	7–0	2–2	0–0
Exeter City	8–1	4–1	3–1	3–0	2–2	2–1	3–1	1–1	2–0	0–6		2–0	1–2	0–1	0–1	3–0	3–0	2–3	4–3	3–3	1–1	1–1
Gillingham	1–1	3–1	0–0	1–0	1–1	1–0	3–6	1–0	2–5	2–0	2–1		1–1	1–3	5–0	3–1	0–0	1–1	2–2	2–0	3–0	1–2
Luton Town	6–1	4–0	4–0	1–1	6–2	4–0	1–2	3–0	4–0	2–2	4–0	2–2		2–1	4–1	2–2	1–1	2–4	1–1	2–0	3–1	2–2
Millwall	3–0	2–0	3–1	0–1	0–2	2–2	1–3	1–1	1–3	3–2	1–0	3–2	1–4		2–0	0–1	2–0	2–2	1–0	1–0	4–2	0–0
Newport County	2–0	6–1	1–0	2–0	1–1	4–0	0–2	3–3	2–1	2–3	1–3	2–2	2–4	1–2		1–3	2–1	2–2	0–5	1–2	1–4	0–1
Northampton Town	0–0	0–1	4–1	2–2	1–0	3–0	1–1	3–1	3–4	3–2	2–1	2–1	2–1	1–0	2–0		1–0	1–3	1–1	4–2	3–0	1–0
Queens Park Rangers	2–0	2–1	2–1	4–1	2–0	2–2	0–3	6–3	1–1	3–3	1–1	2–0	3–0	1–0	4–1	3–1		2–0	1–1	1–1	5–1	2–1
Reading	5–4	4–1	4–4	2–0	5–1	1–1	2–2	0–0	2–0	6–1	2–0	3–0	1–0	2–1	6–1	3–1	0–0		3–2	2–1	3–1	3–2
Southend	2–1	0–0	3–2	6–0	5–1	2–1	0–3	0–2	1–1	1–4	1–2	0–0	3–3	2–1	0–1	2–1	2–0	6–1		2–0	2–3	0–2
Swindon Town	3–2	0–2	4–4	1–0	1–0	2–1	2–2	1–1	0–0	1–1	6–1	3–0	0–1	0–1	0–0	5–3	3–1	1–1	5–0		5–0	2–1
Torquay United	2–1	1–2	3–0	3–1	1–2	5–2	1–2	4–2	1–0	7–1	3–0	5–0	6–2	1–1	2–1	2–0	7–0	1–1	2–0	2–1		1–3
Watford	0–1	3–1	0–1	4–0	3–0	1–3	2–0	5–0	2–0	2–0	0–1	3–1	2–2	2–3	7–0	1–1	2–0	1–0	3–1	7–4	3–0	

Updated to match(es) played on unknown. Source: Ian Laschke: Rothmans Book of Football League Records 1888–89 to 1978–79. Macdonald and Jane’s, London & Sydney, 1980.
Legend: Blue = home team win; Yellow = draw; Red = away team win.

=== Maps ===
Locations of the Football League Third Division South London teams
Locations of the Football League Third Division South teams

== Attendances ==
=== First Division ===
#	Football club	Home games	Average attendance
1	Arsenal FC	21	46,252
2	Manchester City	21	34,824
3	Tottenham Hotspur	21	34,389
4	Aston Villa	21	33,241
5	Chelsea FC	21	32,342
6	Everton FC	21	26,232
7	Sunderland AFC	21	25,397
8	Liverpool FC	21	25,198
9	Wolverhampton Wanderers	21	23,729
10	Stoke City	21	22,349
11	West Bromwich Albion	21	22,277
12	Birmingham City	21	21,790
13	Preston North End	21	21,472
14	Derby County	21	19,251
15	Sheffield Wednesday	21	18,568
16	Portsmouth FC	21	17,995
17	Leicester City	21	17,994
18	Huddersfield Town	21	15,024
19	Leeds United	21	14,927
20	Middlesbrough FC	21	14,376
21	Grimsby Town	21	13,706
22	Blackburn Rovers	21	13,166

== See also ==
- 1934–35 in English football
- 1934 in association football
- 1935 in association football
