= 1934–35 in English football =

Football in England
- Season: 1934–35

Men's football
- Football League: Arsenal
- Football League Second Division: Brentford
- FA Cup: Sheffield Wednesday

The 1934–35 season was the 60th season of competitive football in England. Arsenal became only the second team to win the League three consecutive times after Huddersfield Town who were the first to achieve this in the 1920s under the same manager Herbert Chapman.

== Honours ==
Competition	Winner	Runner-up
First Division	Arsenal (4)	Sunderland
Second Division	Brentford	Bolton Wanderers
Third Division North	Doncaster Rovers	Halifax Town
Third Division South	Charlton Athletic	Reading
FA Cup	Sheffield Wednesday (3)	West Bromwich Albion
Charity Shield	Arsenal	Manchester City
Home Championship	Shared by England and Scotland	

Notes = Number in parentheses is the times that club has won that honour. * indicates new record for competition

== Football League ==
=== First Division ===
Pos	Team	Pld	W	D	L	GF	GA	GAv	Pts	Relegation
1	Arsenal (C)	42	23	12	7	115	46	2.500	58	
2	Sunderland	42	19	16	7	90	51	1.765	54	
3	Sheffield Wednesday	42	18	13	11	70	64	1.094	49	
4	Manchester City	42	20	8	14	82	67	1.224	48	
5	Grimsby Town	42	17	11	14	78	60	1.300	45	
6	Derby County	42	18	9	15	81	66	1.227	45	
7	Liverpool	42	19	7	16	85	88	0.966	45	
8	Everton	42	16	12	14	89	88	1.011	44	
9	West Bromwich Albion	42	17	10	15	83	83	1.000	44	
10	Stoke City	42	18	6	18	71	70	1.014	42	
11	Preston North End	42	15	12	15	62	67	0.925	42	
12	Chelsea	42	16	9	17	73	82	0.890	41	
13	Aston Villa	42	14	13	15	74	88	0.841	41	
14	Portsmouth	42	15	10	17	71	72	0.986	40	
15	Blackburn Rovers	42	14	11	17	66	78	0.846	39	
16	Huddersfield Town	42	14	10	18	76	71	1.070	38	
17	Wolverhampton Wanderers	42	15	8	19	88	94	0.936	38	
18	Leeds United	42	13	12	17	75	92	0.815	38	
19	Birmingham	42	13	10	19	63	81	0.778	36	
20	Middlesbrough	42	10	14	18	70	90	0.778	34	
21	Leicester City (R)	42	12	9	21	61	86	0.709	33	Relegation to the Second Division
22	Tottenham Hotspur (R)	42	10	10	22	54	93	0.581	30	Relegation to the Second Division

Source: World Football
Rules for classification: 1) Points; 2) Goal average; 3) Goals scored
(C) Champions; (R) Relegated

=== Second Division ===
Pos	Team	Pld	W	D	L	GF	GA	GAv	Pts	Promotion or relegation
1	Brentford (C, P)	42	26	9	7	93	48	1.938	61	Promotion to the First Division
2	Bolton Wanderers (P)	42	26	4	12	96	48	2.000	56	Promotion to the First Division
3	West Ham United	42	26	4	12	80	63	1.270	56	
4	Blackpool	42	21	11	10	79	57	1.386	53	
5	Manchester United	42	23	4	15	76	55	1.382	50	
6	Newcastle United	42	22	4	16	89	68	1.309	48	
7	Fulham	42	17	12	13	76	56	1.357	46	
8	Plymouth Argyle	42	19	8	15	75	64	1.172	46	
9	Nottingham Forest	42	17	8	17	76	70	1.086	42	
10	Bury	42	19	4	19	62	73	0.849	42	
11	Sheffield United	42	16	9	17	79	70	1.129	41	
12	Burnley	42	16	9	17	63	73	0.863	41	
13	Hull City	42	16	8	18	63	74	0.851	40	
14	Norwich City	42	14	11	17	71	61	1.164	39	
15	Bradford (Park Avenue)	42	11	16	15	55	63	0.873	38	
16	Barnsley	42	13	12	17	60	83	0.723	38	
17	Swansea Town	42	14	8	20	56	67	0.836	36	
18	Port Vale	42	11	12	19	55	74	0.743	34	
19	Southampton	42	11	12	19	46	75	0.613	34	
20	Bradford City	42	12	8	22	50	68	0.735	32	
21	Oldham Athletic (R)	42	10	6	26	56	95	0.589	26	Relegation to the Third Division North
22	Notts County (R)	42	9	7	26	46	97	0.474	25	Relegation to the Third Division South

Rules for classification: 1) Points; 2) Goal average; 3) Goals scored
(C) Champions; (P) Promoted; (R) Relegated

=== Third Division North ===
Pos	Team	Pld	W	D	L	GF	GA	GAv	Pts	Promotion
1	Doncaster Rovers (C, P)	42	26	5	11	87	44	1.977	57	Promotion to the Second Division
2	Halifax Town	42	25	5	12	76	67	1.134	55	
3	Chester	42	20	14	8	91	58	1.569	54	
4	Lincoln City	42	22	7	13	87	58	1.500	51	
5	Darlington	42	21	9	12	80	59	1.356	51	
6	Tranmere Rovers	42	20	11	11	74	55	1.345	51	
7	Stockport County	42	22	3	17	90	72	1.250	47	
8	Mansfield Town	42	19	9	14	75	62	1.210	47	
9	Rotherham United	42	19	7	16	86	73	1.178	45	
10	Chesterfield	42	17	10	15	71	52	1.365	44	
11	Wrexham	42	16	11	15	76	69	1.101	43	
12	Hartlepools United	42	17	7	18	80	78	1.026	41	
13	Crewe Alexandra	42	14	11	17	66	86	0.767	39	
14	Walsall	42	13	10	19	81	72	1.125	36	
15	York City	42	15	6	21	76	82	0.927	36	
16	New Brighton	42	14	8	20	59	76	0.776	36	
17	Barrow	42	13	9	20	58	87	0.667	35	
18	Accrington Stanley	42	12	10	20	63	89	0.708	34	
19	Gateshead	42	13	8	21	58	96	0.604	34	
20	Rochdale	42	11	11	20	53	71	0.746	33	
21	Southport	42	10	12	20	55	85	0.647	32	Re-elected
22	Carlisle United	42	8	7	27	51	102	0.500	23	Re-elected

Source: rsssf.com
(C) Champions; (P) Promoted

=== Third Division South ===
Pos	Team	Pld	W	D	L	GF	GA	GAv	Pts	Promotion
1	Charlton Athletic (C, P)	42	27	7	8	103	52	1.981	61	Promotion to the Second Division
2	Reading	42	21	11	10	89	65	1.369	53	
3	Coventry City	42	21	9	12	86	50	1.720	51	
4	Luton Town	42	19	12	11	92	60	1.533	50	
5	Crystal Palace	42	19	10	13	86	64	1.344	48	
6	Watford	42	19	9	14	76	49	1.551	47	
7	Northampton Town	42	19	8	15	65	67	0.970	46	
8	Bristol Rovers	42	17	10	15	73	77	0.948	44	
9	Brighton & Hove Albion	42	17	9	16	69	62	1.113	43	
10	Torquay United	42	18	6	18	81	75	1.080	42	
11	Exeter City	42	16	9	17	70	75	0.933	41	
12	Millwall	42	17	7	18	57	62	0.919	41	
13	Queens Park Rangers	42	16	9	17	63	72	0.875	41	
14	Clapton Orient	42	15	10	17	65	65	1.000	40	
15	Bristol City	42	15	9	18	52	68	0.765	39	
16	Swindon Town	42	13	12	17	67	78	0.859	38	
17	Bournemouth & Boscombe Athletic	42	15	7	20	54	71	0.761	37	
18	Aldershot	42	13	10	19	50	75	0.667	36	
19	Cardiff City	42	13	9	20	62	82	0.756	35	
20	Gillingham	42	11	13	18	55	75	0.733	35	
21	Southend United	42	11	9	22	65	78	0.833	31	Re-elected
22	Newport County	42	10	5	27	54	112	0.482	25	Re-elected

(C) Champions; (P) Promoted

=== Top goalscorers ===
First Division

- Ted Drake (Arsenal) – 42 goals

Second Division

- Jack Milsom (Bolton Wanderers) – 31 goals

Third Division North

- Gilbert Alsop (Walsall) – 39 goals

Third Division South

- Ralph Allen (Charlton Athletic) – 32 goals
