= 1935 in association football =

The following are the football (soccer) events of the year 1935 throughout the world.

== Events ==
- 15 November – Honduran club C.D. Victoria is established.

== Winners club national championship ==
- Argentina: Boca Juniors
- England: Arsenal F.C.
- France: FC Sochaux-Montbéliard
- Hungary: Újpest FC
- Italy: Juventus
- Netherlands: PSV Eindhoven
- Poland: Ruch Chorzów
- Romania: Ripensia Timișoara
- Scotland:
  - Division One: Rangers F.C.
  - Scottish Cup: Rangers F.C.
- Soviet Union: team of Moscow
- Spain: Real Betis
- Turkey: Fenerbahçe

== International tournaments ==
- 1935 British Home Championship (September 29, 1934 – April 6, 1935)

Shared by England & Scotland

- III. Dr. Gerö Cup

Italy

== Births ==
- January 3: Alfredo del Águila, Mexican footballer (died 2018)
- January 11: Piero Betello, Italian professional footballer
- January 17: Albert Cheesebrough, English club footballer (died 2020)
- February 4: Horacio Troche, Uruguayan international footballer (died 2014)
- April 12: Heinz Schneiter, Swiss international footballer and manager (died 2017)
- June 24: Juan Bautista Agüero, Paraguayan football striker (died 2018)
- June 26: Bogdan Dochev, Bulgarian football referee (died 2017)
- July 3: Osvaldo Bagnoli, Italian football coach and player
- July 10: Fred Chilton, English professional footballer
- July 12: Hans Tilkowski, German international footballer and coach (died 2020)
- July 18: Vasile Alexandru, Romanian footballer
- July 20: Valér Švec, Slovak football player and coach
- July 24: Giuseppe Virgili, Italian international footballer (died 2016)
- July 27:
  - Mihalj Mesaroš, Yugoslav/Serbian footballer (died 2017)
  - Billy McCullough, Northern Irish footballer
- July 28: Leif Skiöld, Swedish international footballer and ice hockey player (died 2014)
- August 4: Hans-Walter Eigenbrodt, German football player (died 1997)
- August 5: Alec Moyse, English footballer
- August 8: Mário Coluna, Portuguese international footballer and manager (died 2014)
- August 25: José Ramos Delgado, Argentine footballer and manager (died 2010)
- September 5: Alfred Schmidt, German international footballer and manager (died 2016)
- September 7: Pedro Manfredini, Argentine footballer (died 2019)
- September 11: Károly Palotai, Hungarian football player (died 2018)
- October 1: Peter Velappan, Malaysian football administrator and manager (died 2018)
- October 20: Ted Bemrose, English footballer (died 2001)
- December 23: Abdul Ghani Minhat, Malaysian footballer (died 2012)
- December 26: Stevie Chalmers, Scottish international footballer (died 2019)
