= Bemrose =

Bemrose may refer to:

In people:

- Henry Howe Bemrose (1827 – 1911), a British printer and publisher, as well as mayor
- John Bemrose, a Canadian arts journalist, novelist, poet and playwright
- Max Bemrose (1904 – 1986), an English industrialist, politician
- Ted Bemrose, English footballer

In other uses:

- The Bemrose School, a school in Derby, England
