= 1937 in association football =

The following are the football events of 1937 throughout the world.

== Events ==
- May 2 – Puck van Heel becomes Holland's most capped player when he plays his 57th match for the Netherlands national football team against Belgium. Van Heel earned 64 caps during his career.
- Foundation of Air Force Central F.C.
- Sunderland AFC win the FA cup final.

== Winners club national championship ==
- Argentina: River Plate
- France: Olympique de Marseille
- Italy: Bologna
- Netherlands: Ajax Amsterdam
- Paraguay: Olimpia Asunción
- Poland: Cracovia
- Romania: Venus București
- Scotland: Rangers
- Soviet Union: see 1937 in Soviet football
- Turkey: Fenerbahçe
- Kingdom of Yugoslavia: Građanski Zagreb

== International tournaments ==
- 1937 British Home Championship (October 31, 1936 – April 17, 1937)

Wales

- 1937 South American Championship (December 27, 1936 – February 1, 1937)

Argentina

== Births ==
- January 1 – Vlatko Marković, Yugoslavian international footballer (died 2013)
- February 3 – Alex Young Scottish international footballer (died 2017)
- March 13 – Antonio Betancort, Spanish international footballer (died 2015)
- May 16 – Antonio Rattín, Argentine international footballer
- June 1 – Ezio Pascutti, Italian international footballer (died 2017)
- June 27 – Jules Accorsi, French football player and manager
- June 29 – Yair Nossovsky, Israeli footballer
- July 6 – Ernesto Figueiredo, Portuguese footballer
- July 9 – Josef Vacenovský, Czech forward
- July 12
  - Fritz Kehl, Swiss football defender
  - František Valošek, Czech football player
- July 20 – Ilie Datcu, Romanian goalkeeper and coach
- August 9 – Hans Nowak, German international footballer (died 2012)
- August 19 – Richard Møller Nielsen, Danish international footballer and manager (died 2014)
- August 22 – Gennadi Matveyev, Soviet international footballer (died 2014)
- October 14 – Ron Routledge, English professional footballer
- November 8
  - Peter Brabrook, English international footballer (died 2016)
  - Dragoslav Šekularac, Serbian footballer and manager (d. 2019)
- November 10 – Zdeněk Zikán, Czech football player (d. 2013)
- November 20 – Pim van de Meent, Dutch footballer and manager
- December 6 – Alberto Spencer, Ecuadorian-Uruguayan footballer (died 2006)
- December 20 – Gordon Banks, English international footballer (died 2019)
