= Brian Hodgson (footballer) =

English footballer (1936–2018)

Personal information
- Full name: Brian George Hodgson
- Date of birth: 29 January 1936
- Place of birth: Cleethorpes, England
- Date of death: 14 February 2018 (aged 82)
- Place of death: Lincolnshire, England
- Height: 6 ft 0 in (1.83 m)
- Position: Forward

Senior career*
Years	Team	Apps	(Gls)
1955–1956	Askern WMC		
1956–1959	Grimsby Town	7	(1)
1959–1960	Workington	1	(0)
1960–196?	Boston United		
- * Club domestic league appearances and goals

Brian George Hodgson (29 January 1936 – 14 February 2018) was an English professional footballer who played as a forward.
