= John McTurk =

Scottish footballer

Personal information
- Full name: Johnathan McTurk
- Date of birth: 11 July 1936 (age 90)
- Place of birth: Lugar, East Ayrshire, Scotland
- Position: Defender

Youth career
- Auchinleck Talbot

Senior career*
Years	Team	Apps	(Gls)
1951–1961	St Mirren	49	(3)
1957–1958	→ Wrexham (loan)	2	(0)
1961–1962	Queen of the South	45	(6)
1962–1963	Ayr United	1	(0)
1963–1964	Greenock Morton	5	(2)
1964–1965	Stirling Albion	17	(5)
1965–1966	Albion Rovers	22	(3)
- * Club domestic league appearances and goals as of 20:41, 23 March 2018 (UTC)

Johnathan McTurk (born 11 July 1936) is a Scottish former footballer, who played as a defender.

== Career ==
McTurk began his career at St Mirren before being called up to serve with the Royal Engineers.

He was loaned out to Welsh club Wrexham during his time at the club, who flew him in for matches from Fleet. He also played for the Army Team during his time with St Mirren.

After his time at St Mirren, he played spells at Scottish clubs Queen of the South, Ayr United, Greenock Morton, Stirling Albion and Albion Rovers.
