= Ron Routledge =

English footballer

Personal information
- Full name: Ronald Wright Routledge
- Date of birth: 14 October 1937
- Place of birth: Ashington, England
- Height: 5 ft 9 in (1.75 m)
- Position: Goalkeeper

Senior career*
Years	Team	Apps	(Gls)
1954–1958	Sunderland	2	(0)
1958–1962	Bradford Park Avenue	39	(0)
1962–196?	Ashington		
- * Club domestic league appearances and goals

Ronald Wright Routledge (born 14 October 1937) was an English professional footballer who played as a goalkeeper for Sunderland.
