= Ken Jones (English footballer, born 1936) =

English footballer (1936–2018)

Personal information
- Full name: Kenneth Jones
- Date of birth: 1 October 1936
- Place of birth: Easington, County Durham, England
- Date of death: July 2018 (aged 81)
- Place of death: Stockton-on-Tees, England
- Position: Full-back

Senior career*
Years	Team	Apps	(Gls)
1953–1961	Sunderland	10	(0)
1961–1962	Hartlepools United	33	(0)
1962–196?	King's Lynn		
- * Club domestic league appearances and goals

Kenneth Jones (1 October 1936 – July 2018) was an English professional footballer who played as a full-back for Sunderland.
