= Fred Chilton =

English footballer

Personal information
- Full name: Frederick Chilton
- Date of birth: 10 July 1935 (age 91)
- Place of birth: Washington, Tyne and Wear, England
- Position: Full-back

Youth career
- 1952–1953: Usworth Colliery

Senior career*
Years	Team	Apps	(Gls)
1953–1959	Sunderland	3	(0)
1959–19??	North Shields		
- * Club domestic league appearances and goals

Frederick Chilton (born 10 July 1935) was an English professional footballer who played as a full-back for Sunderland.
