= Eddie Werge =

English footballer

Personal information
- Date of birth: 9 September 1936
- Place of birth: Sidcup, Greater London
- Date of death: 2007 (aged 70–71)
- Positions: Winger; wing half

Youth career
- ?–1957: Bexleyheath and Welling

Senior career*
Years	Team	Apps	(Gls)
1957–1961	Charlton Athletic	44	(19)
1961–1965	Crystal Palace	83	(6)
1965–1966	Arcadia Shepherds	?	(?)
1966–1968	Leyton Orient	33	(0)
1968–?	Bexley United	?	(?)
- * Club domestic league appearances and goals

Edward Werge (9 September 1936 – 2007) was an English professional footballer who played as a winger or wing half. He made a total of 160 appearances in the Football League for Charlton Athletic, Crystal Palace and Leyton Orient. He also had a spell in mid-career in South Africa playing for Arcadia Shepherds.

== Playing career ==
=== Early career ===
Eddie Werge began his youth career at Bexleyheath and Welling (later known as Bexley United) before signing for local professional club, Charlton Athletic in 1957. He made 44 appearances for Charlton between then and 1961, scoring 19 goals.

=== Crystal Palace, South Africa and Leyton Orient ===
In May 1961, Werge signed for Crystal Palace for whom he made 83 appearances, scoring 6 times. Werge spent the 1965–66 season in South African football playing for Arcadia Shepherds before returning to England in December 1966 when he signed for Leyton Orient, where he finished his professional career.

=== Later career ===
In 1968, having made a further 33 appearances for Orient, (no goals) he moved back into non-league football with Bexleyheath, by this time known as Bexley United.

After his football career ended, Werge became a driving instructor.

Eddie Werge died in 2007 aged 70 or 71.
