= Piero Betello =

Italian footballer

Personal information
- Date of birth: January 11, 1935
- Place of birth: Rome, Italy
- Date of death: January 14, 2024 (aged 89)
- Place of death: Rome
- Position: Midfielder

Senior career*
Years	Team	Apps	(Gls)
1955–1956	Roma	2	(0)
1956–1957	Palermo	9	(0)
1957–1959	Napoli	19	(1)
1959–1961	Brescia	12	(0)
1961–1962	Empoli	27	(0)
- * Club domestic league appearances and goals

Piero Betello (January 11, 1935, in Rome – January 14, 2024) was an Italian professional football player.

He played for 4 seasons (29 games, 1 goal) in the Serie A for A.S. Roma, U.S. Città di Palermo and S.S.C. Napoli.

== See also ==
- List of football clubs in Italy
