= Les Dodds (footballer, born 1936) =

English footballer

Personal information
- Full name: Leslie Dodds
- Date of birth: 12 October 1936 (age 90)
- Place of birth: Newcastle, England
- Position: Goalkeeper

Senior career*
Years	Team	Apps	(Gls)
1953–1960	Sunderland	6	(0)
1960–196?	Stamfordham A.F.C	?	(?)
Total		6	(0)

International career
1952	England Schoolboys	1	(0)
- * Club domestic league appearances and goals

Leslie (Les) Dodds (born 12 October 1936) is an English retired professional footballer who played as a goalkeeper for Sunderland and England Schoolboys.

== Sunderland A.F.C ==
Les Dodds played for Sunderland in the First Division of English Football. During this time, Sunderland played their home games at Roker Park.

He started in 4 First Division games in the 1954/55 season. He was selected for his professional debut on 21 August 1954 by manager Bill Murray to play in the 4-2 home victory against West Bromwich Albion. His debut came in place of Willie Fraser who could not get leave from the Army and Jimmy Cowan who wasn't fit to play. During this game he played alongside Len Shackleton, Stan Anderson, Ray Daniel, George Aitken. Tommy Wright, Ken Chisholm, Jack Hedley, Joe McDonald, Ted Purdon and Billy Elliott. He next played in the 1-0 defeat away at Everton. He next played in the 2nd April 1955 1-1 draw at home to Leicester City before finishing the season in the final game away at Manchester City, finishing with a 1-0 loss.

In the 1955/56 season, he played in the 3-2 home victory against Charlton Athletic on 26 November 1955 and a 2-1 defeat away at Manchester United on 3 December 1955.

== England Schoolboys ==
Les Dodds played in a Schools' International match vs Scotland at Wembley on April 5, 1952 in front of a crowd of 80,312 culminating in a 1-0 win for England. Also featuring in the match was Duncan Edwards one of the Busby Babes.

This match was notable for being the first football match to be televised in Scotland, having occurred on 5 April, it commenced prior to the Arsenal vs Hibernian match on 22 October, which was the first match televised in Scotland to feature a professional Scottish club.
