= Ted Bemrose =

English footballer

Personal information
- Full name: Frank Edward Bemrose
- Date of birth: 20 October 1935
- Place of birth: Caistor, England
- Date of death: 2001 (aged 65–66)
- Position: Winger

Senior career*
Years	Team	Apps	(Gls)
1957–1959	Caistor		
1959–1961	Grimsby Town	2	(0)
1961–1962	Gainsborough Trinity		
1962–196?	Louth United		
- * Club domestic league appearances and goals

Frank Edward Bemrose (20 October 1935 – 2001) was an English footballer who played as a winger.
