= Outline of association football =

Overview of and topical guide to association football

The following outline is provided as an overview of and topical guide to association football:

Association football – sport played between two teams of eleven players with a spherical ball. At the turn of the 21st century, the game was played by over 250 million players in over 200 countries, making it the world's most popular sport. More commonly known as football or soccer.

== What type of thing is association football? ==
Association football can be described as all of the following:

- Exercise – bodily activity that enhances or maintains physical fitness and overall health or wellness.
  - Aerobic exercise – physical exercise that intends to improve the oxygen system. Aerobic means "with oxygen", and refers to the use of oxygen in the body's energy-generating process (the citric acid cycle).
- Game – structured activity, usually undertaken for enjoyment and sometimes used as an educational tool. Games are distinct from work, which is usually carried out for remuneration, and from art, which is more concerned with the expression of ideas. However, the distinction is not clear-cut, and many games are also considered to be work (such as professional sports).
  - Ball game – game played with a ball.
    - A type of football – sport that involves kicking a ball with the foot to score a goal.
- Sport – form of physical activity which, through casual or organised participation, aim to use, maintain or improve physical fitness and provide entertainment to participants.
  - Competitive sport – sport in which one or more participants or teams compete against one another. The one that is the most successful in achieving the objective of the game or sport event is the winner.
    - A type of football – sport that involves kicking a ball with the foot to score a goal.
  - Goal sport – sport in which an attacking team must send a ball or puck into a physical structure or area called a "goal" in order to score points.
  - Team sport – sport that involves players working together towards a shared objective.
  - Recreational sport – sport engaged in as a leisure time activity.
  - Spectator sport – sport that is characterized by the presence of spectators, or watchers, at its matches. Spectator sports are a form of entertainment.
  - Professional sport – sport in which the athletes receive payment for their performance.

== Names for association football ==
Names for association football

- football
  - futbol
  - futboll
  - fotbal
- soccer

== Equipment ==
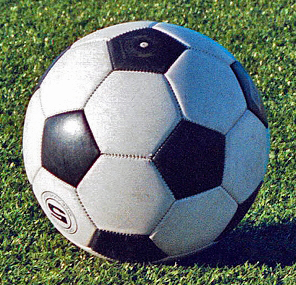
Adidas Telstar-style ball, with the familiar black and white truncated icosahedron pattern.

- Association football pitch – playing field.
- Football – ball used in the sport of association football. The ball's spherical shape, as well as its size, weight, and material composition, are specified by Law 2 of the Laws of the Game maintained by the International Football Association Board (IFAB).
- Kit – standard equipment and attire worn by players.
  - Basic:
    - jersey
    - shorts
    - socks
    - footwear
    - shin pads

== Rules of the game ==
Laws of the Game – the rules.

- Law 1: The Field of Play
- Law 2: The Ball
- Law 3: The Number of Players
- Law 4: The Players' Equipment
- Law 5: The Referee
- Law 6: The Assistant Referees
- Law 7: The Duration of the Match
- Law 8: The Start and Restart of Play
- Law 9: The Ball in and Out of Play
- Law 10: The Method of Scoring
- Law 11: Offside
- Law 12: Fouls and Misconduct
- Law 13: Free kicks (direct and indirect)
- Law 14: The Penalty Kick
- Law 15: The Throw-In
- Law 16: The Goal Kick
- Law 17: Corner kick

=== Variants of association football ===
- Crab football
- Jorkyball
- Powerchair football
- Swamp football
- Three-sided football
- Walking football
- Beach soccer – football played on sand, also known as sand soccer
- Indoor varieties of Association football:
  - Five-a-side football – played throughout the world under various rules including:
    - Futsal ('futebol de salão') – the FIFA-approved Five-a-side indoor game
  - Indoor soccer – the six-a-side indoor game as played in North America
- Keepie uppie – art of juggling with a football using feet, knees, chest, shoulders, and head.
  - Footbag – small bean bag or sand bag used as a ball in a number of keepie uppie variations such as hacky sack.
  - Freestyle Football – modern take on Keepie uppie where freestylers are graded for their entertainment value and expression of skill.
- Paralympic Football – modified association football for disabled competitors.
- Rush goalie – variation of football in which the role of the goalkeeper is more flexible than normal.
- Street football – encompasses a number of informal varieties of football.
  - Panna Knock Out – one-on-one player matches in a cage, with players aiming to nutmeg ("panna" in Surinamese Sranan Tongo and Dutch slang) their opponent to eliminate them.
- Women's association football – played with the exact same rules and equipment as men's football.

== Gameplay ==
=== Strategy ===
- Training ground (association football)
- Formation (association football)
- Association football positions

=== Tactics and techniques ===
Association football tactics and skills

- Anti-football
- Behind The Leg Flip Flap
- Bicycle kick
- Catenaccio
- Combination Game
- Corner kick
- Cruijff Turn
- Curl
- Direct free kick
- Diving
- Flip flap
- Flo Pass
- Formation
- Last man
- Long ball
- Marseille turn
- Nutmeg
- One touch
- Passing
- Pelé runaround move
- Push and run
- Rabona
- Rainbow kick
- Revie Plan
- Seal dribble
- Shooting
- Sliding tackle
- Step over
- Tiki-taka
- Total Football
- Volley
- Work rate

== Association football teams ==
- Football club (association football)
- List of association football clubs
- List of men's national association football teams
- List of women's national association football teams
- List of women's association football clubs

== History of association football ==
History of association football

=== History of association football, by period ===
- Timeline of association football
  - Timeline of English football
  - Timeline of Scottish football
- Prehistory of association football
- Association football during World War I
- Association football during World War II
  - List of footballers killed during World War II

==== By year ====
1840s · 1850s · 1860s
1870 · 1871 · 1872 · 1873 · 1874 · 1875 · 1876 · 1877 · 1878 · 1879
1880 · 1881 · 1882 · 1883 · 1884 · 1885 · 1886 · 1887 · 1888 · 1889
1890 · 1891 · 1892 · 1893 · 1894 · 1895 · 1896 · 1897 · 1898 · 1899
1900 · 1901 · 1902 · 1903 · 1904 · 1905 · 1906 · 1907 · 1908 · 1909
1910 · 1911 · 1912 · 1913 · 1914 · 1915 · 1916 · 1917 · 1918 · 1919
1920 · 1921 · 1922 · 1923 · 1924 · 1925 · 1926 · 1927 · 1928 · 1929
1930 · 1931 · 1932 · 1933 · 1934 · 1935 · 1936 · 1937 · 1938 · 1939
1940 · 1941 · 1942 · 1943 · 1944 · 1945 · 1946 · 1947 · 1948 · 1949
1950 · 1951 · 1952 · 1953 · 1954 · 1955 · 1956 · 1957 · 1958 · 1959
1960 · 1961 · 1962 · 1963 · 1964 · 1965 · 1966 · 1967 · 1968 · 1969
1970 · 1971 · 1972 · 1973 · 1974 · 1975 · 1976 · 1977 · 1978 · 1979
1980 · 1981 · 1982 · 1983 · 1984 · 1985 · 1986 · 1987 · 1988 · 1989
1990 · 1991 · 1992 · 1993 · 1994 · 1995 · 1996 · 1997 · 1998 · 1999
2000 · 2001 · 2002 · 2003 · 2004 · 2005 · 2006 · 2007 · 2008 · 2009
2010 · 2011 · 2012 · 2013 · 2014 · 2015 · 2016 · 2017 · 2018 · 2019
2020

=== History of association football, by region ===
- History of football in Tibet and the diaspora
- History of soccer in the United States
  - History of professional soccer in Seattle

=== History of association football, by subject ===
- History of CAF
- Christianity and association football
- History of the Copa Libertadores
- History of FIFA
- History of the FIFA World Cup
- Homosexuality in association football
- Mental health in association football
- Football club mergers
- Oldest football clubs
- Oldest football competitions
- Professionalism in association football
- Racism in association football
- Unrelegated association football clubs

== Association football culture ==
Association football culture

- Professionalism in association football

=== Association football around the world ===
Association football around the world

- Names for association football (what it is called, where)
- List of association football stadiums by country

=== Association football organizations ===
==== Association football competitions ====
===== International competitions =====
- List of association football competitions

===== Domestic competitions =====
- Geography of association football
- Geography of women's association football

==== Governing bodies ====
- FIFA
- Asian Football Confederation
- CONCACAF
- Confederation of African Football
- CONMEBOL
- Oceania Football Confederation
- UEFA
- International Football Association Board

== Association football publications ==
- Kicker
- Match
- FourFourTwo
- France Football
- Kick Off
- Offside
- Onze Mondial
- Shekicks
- Shoot
- World Soccer

== Persons influential in association football ==
=== Players ===
- List of top association football goal scorers
- Lists of association football players

== See also ==
- Glossary of association football terms
- Outline of sports
- Domestic association football season
- List of national football teams
- List of association football clubs
- List of association football competitions
- List of sports attendance figures – Attendances of many domestic and international competitions, compared with those of other sports around the world
