= 1872 in association football =

The following are events in 1872 which are relevant to the development of association football. Included are events in closely related codes, such as the Sheffield Rules.

== Events ==
- 24 February – England defeat Scotland 1–0 in the fifth and final representative match between the two teams.
- 16 March – Wanderers defeat Royal Engineers 1–0 in the inaugural FA Cup Final at the Kennington Oval. Morton Betts scores the winning goal in the 15th minute after a successful dribble by Walpole Vidal.
- 30 November – The first FIFA-recognised international match is played in front of a crowd of 4,000 between Scotland and England at Hamilton Crescent, Partick. It ends as a 0–0 draw.

== Clubs founded ==
=== England ===
- Kettering Town
- Telford United

=== France ===
- Le Havre becomes the first French football and rugby club, playing football on a regular basis from 1894.

=== Scotland ===
- Rangers
- Vale of Leven
- Dumbarton
- Renton
- Third Lanark

=== Wales ===
- Wrexham is founded on 28 September at the local Turf Hotel by two members of the Wrexham Cricket Club, who want to play sport during the winter months. It is the first Welsh football club.

== Domestic cups ==
Nation	Tournament	Champion	Final Score	Second place	Venue	Title	Last Honor	Ref
England	1871–72 FA Cup	Wanderers	1-0	Royal Engineers	Kennington Oval	1st	—N/a	

== Births ==
- 27 January – Jack Taylor (d. 1949), Scotland international forward in four matches (1892–1895); made 400 appearances for Everton (1896–1910), scoring 80 goals.
- 28 February – Billy Greer (footballer) ( d. 1937), English footballer
- 27 April – Kelly Houlker (d. 1962), England international half-back in five matches (1902–1906).
- 8 May – Bill Crawford (d. 1955), English professional footballer
- 10 May – Charlie Athersmith (d. 1910), England international forward in twelve matches, scoring three goals (1892–1900); won five league titles with Aston Villa.
- 25 November – G. O. Smith (d. 1943), England international forward in twenty matches (1893–1901), scoring eleven goals; captained the England team in at least thirteen matches from 1896 to 1901.
- 21 December – Lewis Vaughan Lodge (d. 1916), England international full-back in five matches (1894–1896).
- 26 December – Joe McMain (d. 1957), English footballer
- 27 December – Tommy Crawshaw (d. 1960), England international centre-half in ten matches (1895–1904).
- Full date unknown:
  - Harry Davy (d. 1896), English professional footballer.
  - Charles Hudson (d. 1955), English professional footballer.
