= George Gregory =

George Gregory may refer to:

- George Gregory Jr. (1921–2003), South Carolina justice
- George Gregory (1670–1746), English MP for Nottingham
- George Gregory (basketball) (1906–1994), basketball player for Columbia University
- George C. Gregory (1878–1956), American attorney, businessman, historian, and author
- George Gregory (Sussex MP) (1813–1893), British MP for East Grinstead
- George Frederick Thompson Gregory (1916–1973), Canadian politician representing Victoria City
- George Gregory (British writer) (1754–1808), British writer, scholar and cleric
- George W. Gregory (1879–1946), University of Michigan football player
- George Gregory (cricketer) (1878–1958), English cricketer
- George Gregory (physician) (1790–1853), English physician
- George S. Gregory (1846–?), warden of the Borough of Norwalk, Connecticut, 1887–1888
- George Gregory (footballer) (1873–?), English professional footballer
- George W. Gregory Jr. (born 1938), member of the South Carolina House of Representatives
- George Washington Gregory, banjo player and composer
