= 1954 in association football =

The following are the football (soccer) events of the year 1954 throughout the world.

== Events ==
- May 8 – The Asian Football Confederation is founded in Manila, Philippines.
- June 15 – UEFA is founded in Basel, Switzerland.

== Winners club national championship ==
- (Albania) : KF Partizani Tirana
- Argentina: Boca Juniors
- Austria: Rapid Vienna
- Belgium: R.S.C. Anderlecht
- Bulgaria: CSKA Sofia
- Czechoslovakia: Spartak Prague Sokolovo
- Denmark: Køge BK
- (West Germany) East Germany: BSG Turbine Erfurt
- England: Wolverhampton Wanderers F.C.
- Faroe Islands: KÍ Klaksvík
- Finland: Pyrkivä Turku
- France: Lille OSC
- Greece: Olympiacos F.C.
- Hungary: Budapest Honvéd FC
- Iceland: ÍA
- Ireland: Shamrock Rovers F.C.
- Italy: Internazionale Milano F.C.
- Luxembourg: Jeunesse Esch
- Netherlands: FC Eindhoven
- Northern Ireland: Linfield F.C.
- Norway: Skeid
- Poland: Polonia Bytom
- Portugal: Sporting CP
- Romania: Flamura Roșie Arad
- Scotland: Celtic F.C.
- Spain: Real Madrid
- Sweden: GAIS
- Switzerland: FC La Chaux-de-Fonds
- (Soviet Union) USSR: Dynamo Moscow
- West Germany: Hannover 96
- Yugoslavia: Dinamo Zagreb

== International tournaments ==
- 1954 British Home Championship (October 10, 1953 – April 2, 1954)

England

- FIFA World Cup in Switzerland (June 16 – July 4, 1954)
  1. West Germany
  2. Hungary
  3. Austria

== Births ==
- January 5 — Jan Everse, Dutch footballer and manager
- January 20 — Daniela Sogliani
- February 7 — Jimmy Bailey, Honduran international footballer
- February 13 — Dominique Bathenay, French international footballer
- February 19 — Sócrates, Brazilian international footballer (died 2011)
- April 1 — Giancarlo Antognoni, Italian international footballer
- April 14 — László Fekete, Hungarian international footballer (died 2014)
- April 19 — Trevor Francis, English international footballer and manager
- May 18 — Eric Gerets, Belgian international footballer and manager
- May 12 — Wolfgang Dremmler, German international footballer
- June 26 — Luis Arconada, Spanish international footballer
- July 15 — Mario Kempes, Argentinian international footballer
- August 4 — Claudio Cavalieri, Italian professional football (died 1977)
- August 18 — Jan Peters, Dutch international footballer
- August 22 — Emilio Campos, Venezuelan international footballer
- August 24 — Heini Otto, Dutch footballer and manager
- October 30 — Ramón Maradiaga, Honduran footballer and manager
- November 18 — Adrie Koster, Dutch footballer and manager
- December 1 — François Van der Elst, Belgian international footballer (died 2017)

== Deaths ==
- January 31 – Vivian Woodward, English footballer (born 1879)
