= William Crawford =

William, Bill, or Billy Crawford may refer to:

== Entertainment ==
- William Broderick Crawford (1911–1986), American film actor
- Bill Crawford (cartoonist) (1913–1982), American editorial cartoonist
- William L. Crawford (1911–1984), American publisher and editor
- Bill Crawford (comedian) (born 1979), American comedian and radio personality
- Billy Crawford (born 1982), Filipino entertainer
- William Crawford (knight), character in epic poem about Scottish knight William Wallace

== Military ==
- William Crawford (soldier) (1732–1782), soldier in American Revolution, burnt at the stake by Native Americans
- William Lyne Crawford (1839–1920), American Confederate soldier and lawyer
- William J. Crawford (1918–2000), American soldier and Medal of Honor recipient
- William Crawford (Royal Navy officer) (1907–2003), British admiral

== Politics ==
- William Crawford (Pennsylvania politician) (1760–1823), American representative from Pennsylvania
- William Crawford (Virginia politician) (died 1762), politician in Virginia House of Burgesses, founder of Portsmouth, Virginia
- William H. Crawford (1772–1834), U.S. Secretary of War and Secretary of the Treasury
- William T. Crawford (1856–1913), U.S. representative from North Carolina
- Bill Crawford (Indiana politician) (1936–2015), Democrat in Indiana House of Representatives
- William Sharman Crawford (1781–1861), Irish MP
- William Crawford (London MP) (1780–1843), British MP for the City of London, 1833–1841
- William Crawford (trade unionist) (1833–1890), British MP for Mid Durham, 1885–1890
- William Fitzgerald Crawford (1844–1915), New Zealand mayor, storekeeper and photographer
- William Crawford (Canadian politician) (1847–1897), Canadian surveyor and politician in Manitoba
- William A. Crawford (1915–2001), U.S. ambassador to Romania
- William R. Crawford Jr. (1928–2002), U.S. ambassador to Yemen and Cyprus
- William Crawford (Louisiana politician), Louisiana politician

== Sports ==
- Billy Crawford (American football) (1864–1933), American football player and coach
- Bill Crawford (footballer) (1872–1955), English pro footballer
- William Ernie Crawford (1891–1959), Irish rugby union player
- Bill Crawford (gridiron football) (born 1937), Canadian player of gridiron football

== Other ==
- William Crawford (judge) (1784–1849), United States federal judge
- William Crawford (1788–1847), philanthropist, prison reformer, and co-founder of the Peace Society
- William Crawford (artist) (1822–1869), Scottish painter
- William Monod Crawford (1872–1941), Irish colonial civil servant in India and entomologist
- William Horatio Crawford (1815–1888), Irish brewer and philanthropist

== See also ==
- Bill Crawford-Compton (1915–1988), New Zealand-born pilot
- Wille Crafoord (born 1966), Swedish composer and singer
- William Crawford & Sons, former British biscuit company
- Willie Crawford (1946–2004), American Major League Baseball player
- Wilf Crawford (1915–1993), Scotland international rugby union player
- Will C. Crawford High School, a school in San Diego, California
