= 1916–17 Maltese Premier League =

Maltese First Division
- Season: 1916–17
- Champions: St. George's (1st title)
- Matches played: 15
- Goals scored: 47 (3.13 per match)

The 1916–17 Maltese First Division was the sixth edition Maltese First Division and was won by St. George's in a final match decider against Sliema Wanderers, won 4–0 by the Cospicua-based club.

== League table ==
Pos	Team	Pld	W	D	L	GF	GA	GD	Pts
1	St. George's (Note: St. George's and Sliema Wanderers finished equal on points, and a Championship tie-breaker to determine the winner was won by St. George's) (C)	5	4	0	1	5	1	+4	8
2	Sliema Wanderers	5	4	0	1	16	5	+11	8
3	Ħamrun Spartans	5	3	1	1	13	6	+7	7
4	Valletta United	5	2	1	2	8	6	+2	5
5	Floriana Liberty	6	1	1	4	4	12	−8	3
6	Vittoriosa Rovers	5	0	0	5	1	17	−16	0

Source: RSSSF
Rules for classification: 1) Points; 2) Play-offs (only if needed to decide champions).
(C) Champions

== Championship tie-breaker ==
With both St. George's and Sliema Wanderers level on 12 points, a play-off match was conducted to decide the champion.

4 March 1917

St. George's	4–0	Sliema Wanderers

== Results ==
Home \ Away	STG	SLI	ĦAM	VAL	FLL	VIT
St. George's	—	2–0	0–1	1–0	1–0	1–0
Sliema Wanderers		—	2–0	3–2	4–1	7–0
Ħamrun Spartans			—	2–2	5–1	5–1
Valletta United				—	2–0	2–0
Floriana Liberty					—	2–0
Vittoriosa Rovers						—

Source: EU-Football.info

== See also ==
- 1916 in association football
- 1917 in association football
