= 1873 in association football =

The following are events in 1873 which are relevant to the development of association football. Included are events in closely related codes, such as the Sheffield Rules.

== Events ==
- 8 March – England defeat Scotland 4–2 at Kennington Oval in the second officially recognised international match. The first goal in international football is scored by William Kenyon-Slaney of England in the second minute.
- 13 March – Foundation of the Scottish Football Association.
- 29 March – Wanderers retain the FA Cup after defeating Oxford University 2–0 in the final at Lillie Bridge in west London. The goals are scored by A. F. Kinnaird (27 minutes) and Charles Wollaston (80).
- 18 October – The first-ever Scottish Cup tie is played between Renton and Kilmarnock, Renton winning 2–0.
- The offside law is amended to be applicable to a player who is offside when the ball is touched and played by a teammate, not when receiving the ball.

== Clubs founded ==
=== England ===
- Chippenham Town
- Gainsborough Trinity
- Halesowen Town
- Hanover United, believed to be the first club called "United".

== Domestic cups ==
Nation	Tournament	Champion	Final Score	Second place	Venue	Title	Previous title won
England	1872–73 FA Cup	Wanderers	2–0	Oxford University	Lille Bridge	2nd	1871-72

== Births ==
- 10 January – William Lambie (d. unknown), Scotland international forward in nine matches (1892–1897), scoring five goals.
- 21 January – Ernest Needham (d. 1936), England international half-back in sixteen matches (1894–1902), scoring three goals.
- 23 February – Neilly Gibson (d. unknown), Scotland international in fourteen matches (1895–1905).
- 14 March – George Raikes (d. 1966), England international goalkeeper in four matches (1895–1896).
- 27 April – William Oakley (d. 1934), England international full-back in sixteen matches (1895–1901).
- 1 June – Harry Rennie (d. 1954), Scotland international goalkeeper in thirteen matches (1900–1908).
- 24 August – John Walker (d. 1937), Scotland international forward in five matches (1895–1904), scoring three goals.
- 22 September – Joseph Humpage (d. 1953), English footballer
- 14 October – Jules Rimet (d. 1956), French football administrator. The 3rd President of FIFA (1921–1954) who would initiate the first FIFA World Cup in 1930, the Jules Rimet Trophy being named in his honour.
- 8 November – Fred Forman (d. 1910), England international forward in three matches (1899), scoring three goals.
- 25 December – Nicol Smith (d. 1905), Scotland international defender in twelve matches (1897–1902).
- Full date unknown
  - George Gregory (d. 1893), English professional footballer
