= 1876 in association football =

The following are events in 1876 which are relevant to the development of association football. Included are events in closely related codes, such as the Sheffield Rules.

== Events ==
- Football Association of Wales is founded.

== Clubs founded ==
=== England ===
- Accrington (note – this is the original Accrington club, not Accrington Stanley)
- Leek Town
- Middlesbrough
- Port Vale
- Stafford Rangers
- Stourbridge

=== Scotland ===
- Falkirk
- Partick Thistle

== Domestic cups ==
| Nation | Tournament | Winner | Score | | Runner-up | Venue | Title | Last honour |
|---|---|---|---|---|---|---|---|---|
| England | 1875–76 FA Cup | Wanderers | Final | 1-1 | Old Etonians | Kennington Oval | 3rd | 1872–73 |
| England | 1875–76 FA Cup | Wanderers | Replay | 3-0 | Old Etonians | Kennington Oval | 3rd | 1872–73 |
| Scotland | 1875–76 Scottish Cup | Queen's Park | Final | 1-1 | 3rd Lanark RV | Hampden Park | 3rd | 1874–75 |
| Scotland | 1875–76 Scottish Cup | Queen's Park | Replay | 2-0 | 3rd Lanark RV | Hampden Park | 3rd | 1874–75 |

== Births ==
- 4 January – Harry Johnson (d. 1940), England international half-back in six matches (1900–1903).
- 20 January – Billy Williams (d. 1929), England international full-back in six matches (1897–1899).
- 13 April – Bob McColl (d. 1959), Scotland international forward in thirteen matches (1896–1908), scoring thirteen goals.
- 10 October – John Harker, English professional footballer (d. 1962)
- 7 November – Alex Smith (d. 1954), Scotland international forward in twenty matches (1898–1911), scoring six goals.
