= 1917 in association football =

The following are the football (soccer) events of the year 1917 throughout the world.

== Events ==
Due to the First World War several leagues remain suspended throughout Europe.

- Full date unknown:
  - C.D. Palhavã, a Portuguese football club from, Palhavã is founded.

== Winners club national championship ==
- Argentina: Racing Club
- Austria: Rapid Vienna
- Belgium: no national championship
- Denmark: KB
- England: no national championship
- France: no national championship
- Germany: no national championship
- Hungary: MTK Hungária FC
- Iceland: Fram
- Italy: no national championship
- Luxembourg: US Hollerich
- Netherlands: Go Ahead
- Paraguay: Club Libertad
- Scotland:
  - Division One: Celtic F.C.
  - Scottish Cup: No competition
- Sweden: Djurgårdens IF
- Uruguay: Nacional
- Greece: 1913 to 1921 - no championship titles due to the First World War and the Greco-Turkish War of 1919-1922.

== International tournaments ==
- 1917 Far Eastern Championship Games (May 9–11, 1917)

(Republic of China (1912–1949)) China

- South American Championship 1917 in Uruguay (September 30, 1917 – October 14, 1917)

Uruguay

== Births ==
- April 23 – Walter Warning, German professional footballer
- June 8 – Zvonimir Koceić, Croatian footballer (died 1997)
- September 20 – Obdulio Varela, Uruguayan international footballer (died 1996)
- October 12 – Roque Máspoli, Uruguayan international footballer (died 2004)
- December 12 – Fred Stansfield, Welsh international footballer (died 2014)

== Deaths ==
- August 10 - Jimmy Speirs, Scottish footballer and scorer of 1911 FA Cup Final winning goal
