= 1870 in association football =

The following are events in 1870 which are relevant to the development of association football. Included are events in closely related codes, such as the Sheffield Rules.

Maidenhead Football Club was established in October 1870, with the club's first match played on 17 December 1870 against Windsor Home Park at Bond's Meadow.

== Events ==
- 5 March – a representative match between teams called England and Scotland is played at Kennington Oval and results in a 1–1 draw. (Note: Despite being recognised as internationals at the time, these two matches are not now recognised as full internationals by FIFA because the majority of the Scotland team were London-based players of Scottish ancestry.)
- 19 November – a second representative match between the two teams results in a 1–0 victory to England.
- Various dates – match reports from London and Sheffield mention goalkeepers and, in tactical terms, the passage from a "dribbling game" to a "passing game". Royal Engineers are noted as early practitioners of the passing game.

== Clubs founded ==
=== England ===
- Abingdon Town
- Rotherham County

=== Scotland ===
- Stranraer – the third-oldest football club in Scotland behind Queen's Park and Kilmarnock and one of the 20 oldest in the world.

== Births ==
- 25 January – Fred Spiksley (d. 1948), England international forward in seven matches, scoring seven goals (1893–1898).
- 13 April – Jock Drummond (d. 1935), Scotland international defender in 14 matches (1892–1903) and captain in four; won five Scottish Cups and four league titles with Rangers.
- 22 April – Jack Robinson (d. 1931), England international goalkeeper in eleven matches (1897–1901).
- 9 September – Tom Waddell (d. unknown), Scotland international in six matches (1891–1895).
- 12 September – Alf Milward (d. 1941), England international forward in four matches, scoring three goals (1891–1897).
- 3 October – Alex Fotheringham (d. -), Scottish professional footballer
- 16 October – Sandy McMahon (d. 1916), Scotland international forward in six matches, scoring four goals (1892–1902); won four league titles with Celtic from 1893 to 1898.
- unknown date – James Gillespie (d. unknown), Scotland international forward in one match (1898), scoring a hat-trick; won the English league title with Sunderland in 1893 and 1895.
