= Charles Hudson (footballer) =

English footballer

Personal information
- Full name: Charles Herbert Hudson
- Date of birth: 1872
- Place of birth: Birmingham, England
- Date of death: 1955 (aged 82–83)
- Position: Full-back

Senior career*
| Years | Team | Apps | (Gls) |
| 1895–1896 | Grimsby Town | 5 | (0) |
- * Club domestic league appearances and goals

Charles Herbert Hudson (1872 – 1955) was an English professional footballer who played as a full-back.
