= William Crawford (knight) =

Sir William Crawford is a character in The Wallace, Blind Harry's epic poem about William Wallace. He appears to be an unhistorical character, although there was a Crawford family in Ayrshire at the time of the Wars of Scottish Independence, some of whom may have been Sheriff of Ayrshire.

Harry may state that Sir William commanded 400 cavalry to run the English forces out of Scotland after the Battle of Stirling Bridge in September 1297.

According to Harry, 1299 Sir William escorted Wallace to the court of King Philip IV of France. While sailing from Scotland the Scots captured the pirate known as the "Red Reiver" (Thomas Longoville) and later gained his amnesty from Phillip in Paris. While in France they commanded the Scots Guard in two military victories over the English.

== Alternative spellings ==
- Craufurd or Crawfurd in Scotland
