= Albert Hatton =

English footballer

Personal information
- Full name: Albert Hatton
- Date of birth: 1879
- Place of birth: Nottingham, England
- Date of death: 1963 (aged 83–84)
- Position: Wing half

Senior career*
Years	Team	Apps	(Gls)
1906–1907	Sutton Junction		
1907–1910	Grimsby Town	74	(2)
1910–1912	Crystal Palace		
1912–1913	Aberdare Town		
1913–191?	Rotherham Town		
- * Club domestic league appearances and goals

Albert Hatton (1879–1963) was an English professional footballer who played as a wing half.
