= John Harker (footballer) =

English footballer

Personal information
- Full name: John James Harker
- Date of birth: 10 October 1876
- Place of birth: Hunwick, England
- Date of death: 1962 (aged 85–86)
- Position: Inside forward

Senior career*
Years	Team	Apps	(Gls)
1898–1899	Thornaby Utopians		
1899	Sunderland	1	(0)
1899–1???	Thornaby Utopians		
- * Club domestic league appearances and goals

John James Harker (10 October 1876 – 1962) was an English professional footballer who played as an inside forward for Sunderland.
