= Walter Berg (footballer) =

German footballer (1916–1949)

Personal information
- Full name: Walter Alexander Johannes Berg
- Date of birth: 21 April 1916
- Place of birth: Essen, Germany
- Date of death: 12 May 1949 (aged 33)
- Place of death: Milín, Czechoslovakia
- Position: Midfielder

Senior career*
Years	Team	Apps	(Gls)
–1935	SV Kray 04		
1935–1939	Schalke 04		
1940	Hamburger SV		
1940–1944	Schalke 04		

International career
1938	Germany	1	(0)
- * Club domestic league appearances and goals

Walter Alexander Johannes Berg (21 April 1916 – 12 May 1949) was a German international footballer who played as a midfielder.

== Personal life ==
Berg served as a Gefreiter (private) in the German Army during the Second World War. Captured by Soviet forces, he died in a prisoner of war camp in Czechoslovakia on 12 May 1949.
