= 1916 in association football =

The following are the football (soccer) events of the year 1916 throughout the world.

== Events ==
- Numerous national championships in Europe are suspended for the duration of the First World War, with a notable exception of the Netherlands, which continues throughout the hostilities.
- 25 April: Football Association of Thailand founded.
- Thailand: Army United F.C. is founded.

== Winners club national championship ==
- Argentina: Racing Club
- Austria: Rapid Vienna
- Belgium: no national championship
- Denmark: KB
- England: no national championship
- France: no national championship
- Germany: no national championship
- Hungary: no national championship
- Iceland: Fram
- Italy: no national championship
- Luxembourg: US Hollerich
- Netherlands: Willem II
- Paraguay: Olimpia
- Scotland:
  - Division One – Celtic
  - Scottish Cup – No competition
- Sweden: AIK
- Uruguay: Nacional
- Greece: 1913 to 1921 - no championship titles due to the First World War and the Greco-Turkish War of 1919-1922.

== International tournaments ==
- South American Championship 1916 in Argentina (July 2, 1916 – July 17, 1916)

Uruguay

== Births ==
- April 21 - Walter Berg, German footballer (d. 1949)
- July 5 - Ivor Powell, Welsh footballer (d. 2012]
- July 19 - François Mercier, French footballer (d. 1996)
- July 31 - Ignacio Trelles, Mexican football player and coach (d. 2020)
- August 22 - Joe Martinelli, American footballer (d. 1991)

== Clubs founded ==
- Army United F.C.
- 5 March: RCD Mallorca
- 2 July: Swift Hesperange
