= Harry Davy =

English footballer

Personal information
- Date of birth: 1872
- Place of birth: Padiham, England
- Position: Right back

Senior career*
Years	Team	Apps	(Gls)
- Padiham
- Heywood Central
	Blackpool	0	(0)
1895–1896	Leicester Fosse	51	(0)
- Bristol City
- * Club domestic league appearances and goals

Harry Davy (1872 – after 1896) was an English professional footballer. A right back, he played in the Football League for Leicester Fosse.
