= Daniela Sogliani =

French footballer (born 1954)

Personal information
- Date of birth: 20 January 1954 (age 72)
- Place of birth: Marcaria, Italy
- Height: 1.60 m (5 ft 3 in)
- Position: Forward

Senior career*
Years	Team	Apps	(Gls)
1971-1972	Peco Saronno		
1973	Peco Bergamo		
1974	Lombarda		
1975-1980	ACF Milan		

International career
1972-1978	Italy	27	(16)
- * Club domestic league appearances and goals

Daniela Sogliani (born 20 January 1954) is an Italian football manager and former player.
