= Joe McMain =

English footballer

Personal information
- Full name: Joseph McMain
- Date of birth: 26 December 1872
- Place of birth: Blackpool, England
- Date of death: 1957 (aged 84–85)
- Position: Inside forward

Senior career*
Years	Team	Apps	(Gls)
1893–1894	South Shore		
1894–1895	Preston North End	0	(0)
1895–1896	Kettering		
1896–1899	Wolverhampton Wanderers	46	(19)
1899–1900	Notts County	26	(13)
1900–1904	Kettering		
1904–1905	Wednesbury Old Athletic		
1905	Wellingborough Montrose		
Total		72	(32)
- * Club domestic league appearances and goals

Joseph McMain (26 December 1872 – 1957) was an English footballer who played in the Football League for Notts County and Wolverhampton Wanderers.
