= Emilio Campos =

Venezuelan footballer (1954–2022)

Emilio Campos (August 22, 1954 – September 18, 2022) was a Venezuelan football (soccer) player. Campos played for ULA. He played as defender.

== International career ==
Campos made 17 appearances for the senior Venezuela national football team from 1979 to 1985. He also competed for Venezuela at the 1980 Summer Olympics in Moscow, Soviet Union, where the team was eliminated after the preliminary round.
