= Alex Fotheringham =

Scottish footballer

Personal information
- Full name: Alexander Fotheringham
- Date of birth: 3 October 1870
- Place of birth: Inverness, Scotland
- Position: Full-back

Senior career*
| Years | Team | Apps | (Gls) |
| 1897–1899 | Inverness Caledonian | | |
| 1899 | Sunderland | 1 | (0) |
| 1899–1900 | Inverness Caledonian | | |
| 1900–1901 | Nottingham Forest | 0 | (0) |
- * Club domestic league appearances and goals

Alexander Fotheringham (3 October 1870 – ) was a Scottish professional footballer who played as a full-back for Sunderland.
