= Billy Greer (footballer) =

English footballer

Personal information
- Full name: William Henry Greer
- Date of birth: 28 February 1872
- Place of birth: Preston, England
- Date of death: 1937 (aged 64–65)
- Position: Centre half

Senior career*
Years	Team	Apps	(Gls)
1891–1898	Preston North End	107	(7)
1898–1899	Darwen	6	(0)
Total		113	(7)
- * Club domestic league appearances and goals

William Henry Greer (28 February 1872 – 1937) was an English footballer who played in the Football League for Darwen and Preston North End.
