= Zvonimir Koceić =

Croatian footballer

Personal information
- Full name: Zvonimir Koceić
- Date of birth: 8 June 1917
- Place of birth: Dugopolje, Croatia-Slavonia, Austria-Hungary
- Date of death: 16 January 1997 (aged 79)
- Place of death: Zagreb, Croatia
- Position: Forward

Senior career*
| Years | Team | Apps | (Gls) |
| 1935 | Hajduk Split | 8 | (1) |
| 1936 | Osvit Šibenik | | |
| 1937–1945 | HAŠK | | |

International career
| 1942–1943 | Independent State of Croatia | 2 | (0) |
- * Club domestic league appearances and goals

Zvonimir Koceić (8 June 1917 – 16 January 1997), nicknamed Zvonko, was a Croatian footballer who played as a forward and made two appearances for the Croatia national team.

== International career ==
Koceić made his international debut for Croatia on 1 November 1942 in a friendly match against Germany, which finished as a 1–5 loss in Stuttgart. He earned his second and final cap on 6 June 1943 in a friendly against Slovakia, which finished as a 3–1 win in Bratislava. He played both games under the flag of the Independent State of Croatia, a World War II-era puppet state of Nazi Germany.

== Personal life ==
Koceić died on 16 January 1997 at the age of 79.

== Career statistics ==
=== International ===
Croatia
| Year | Apps | Goals |
|---|---|---|
| 1942 | 1 | 0 |
| 1943 | 1 | 0 |
| Total | 2 | 0 |
