= 1881 in association football =

The following are the association football events of the year 1881 throughout the world.

== Events ==
Clubs founded

=== France ===
- FC Girondins de Bordeaux

=== England ===
- Berwick Rangers F.C.
- Leyton Orient F.C.
- Watford F.C.

=== Scotland ===
- East Stirlingshire F.C.

=== Wales ===
- Colwyn Bay F.C.

== Domestic cups ==
Nation	Tournament	Winner	Score	Runner-up	Venue	Title	Last title won
England	1880–81 FA Cup	Old Carthusians	3-0	Old Etonians	Kennington Oval	1st	None
Ireland	1880–81 Irish Cup	Moyola Park	1-0	Cliftonville	Cliftonville Cricket Ground	1st	None
Scotland	1880–81 Scottish Cup	Queen's Park	3-1 (after replay voided 2-1 win for Queen's Park)	Dumbarton	Kinning Park sports ground	5th	1880
Wales	1880–81 Welsh Cup	Druids	2-0	Newtown White Stars	Racecourse Ground	2nd	1880

== Births ==
- 9 February – Jimmy Hay (d. 1940), Scotland international half-back in eleven matches (1905–1914).
- 22 May – Colin Veitch (d. 1938), England international half-back in six matches (1906–1909).
- 3 July – Horace Bailey (d. 1960), England international goalkeeper in five matches (1908).
- 19 July – Stanley Harris (d. 1926), England international forward in six matches (1904–1906), scoring two goals.
- 22 August – Harry Makepeace (d. 1952), England international half-back in four matches (1906–1912); also a cricket international.
- 20 September – Alex Bennett (d. 1940), Scotland international forward in eleven matches (1904–1913).
- 26 September – Albert Lindsay, English professional footballer (d. 1961)
