= Claudio Cavalieri =

Italian footballer (1954–1977)

Personal information
- Date of birth: 4 August 1954
- Place of birth: Rome, Italy
- Date of death: 9 June 1977 (aged 22)
- Height: 1.83 m (6 ft 0 in)
- Position: Defender

Senior career*
Years	Team	Apps	(Gls)
1974–1975	Roma	2	(0)
1975–1976	Brindisi	4	(0)
1976–1977	Avellino	5	(0)
- * Club domestic league appearances and goals

Claudio Cavalieri (born 4 August 1954 in Rome, died 9 June 1977) was an Italian professional football player.

His debut season, in which he played 2 games for A.S. Roma, was his only season in the Serie A.
