= 1879 in association football =

The following are the association football events of the year 1879 throughout the world.

== Events ==
=== Clubs founded in 1879 ===
Denmark

Kjøbenhavns Boldklub

England

Doncaster Rovers
Fulham
Scarborough
Sunderland
Sutton Coldfield Town
Swindon Town

Ireland

Cliftonville
Lisburn Distillery

Netherlands

Royal Haarlemsche

Scotland

Montrose

Switzerland

FC St Gallen

== Domestic cups ==
Nation	Tournament	Winner	Score	Runner-up	Venue	Title	Last title won
England	1878–79 FA Cup	Old Etonians	1-0	Clapham Rovers	Kennington Oval	1st	None
Scotland	1878–79 Scottish Cup	Vale of Leven	1-1 (Rangers refused to replay and Vale of Leven were awarded the Cup)	Rangers	Hampden Park	3rd	1878
Wales	1878–79 Welsh Cup	Newtown White Stars	1-0	Wrexham	Cricket Field	1st	None

== Births ==
- 10 January – Bobby Walker (d. 1930), Scotland international forward in 29 matches (1900–1913), scoring eight goals.
- 7 May – Ben Warren (d. 1917), England international half-back in 22 matches (1906–1911), scoring two goals.
- 3 June – Vivian Woodward (d. 1954), England international forward in 23 matches (1903–1911), scoring a record 29 goals.
- 21 September – Peter McWilliam (d. 1951), Scotland international half-back in eight matches (1905–1911).
- 26 September – Bob Crompton (d. 1941), England international full-back in 41 matches (1902–1914); 528 games for Blackburn Rovers (1896–1920).
- (date unknown) – Albert Hatton (d. 1963), a player of Grimsby Town in 1907–1910
