= George Gregory (physician) =

English physician

George Gregory (16 August 1790 – 25 January 1853) was an English physician.

== Life ==
He was a grandson of John Gregory, and second son of the Rev. William Gregory, one of the six preachers of Canterbury Cathedral; he was born at Canterbury on 16 August 1790. After his father's death in 1803 he lived with his uncle, Dr James Gregory, in Edinburgh. He studied medicine in 1806–9 at the University of Edinburgh, and afterwards at St George's Hospital, London, and the Windmill Street School of Medicine. He graduated with an MD from the University of Edinburgh in 1811, and became MRCS in 1812.

In 1813 he was sent as assistant-surgeon to the British forces in the Mediterranean, where he served in Sicily and at the capture of Genoa. At the end of the Napoleonic Wars he retired on half-pay, and began to practise in London. He gave lectures on medicine at the Windmill Street School, and later at St Thomas's Hospital. He was physician to the Smallpox and Vaccination Hospital from 1824, and to the General Dispensary.

He was elected a licentiate (30 September 1816) then a fellow (30 September 1839) of the Royal College of Physicians. He died at Camden Square, London, on 25 January 1853.

== Works ==
Gregory was a prolific writer in medical journals, and was a contributor to the Cyclopædia of Practical Medicine and to the Library of Medicine. His major works are:

- Elements of the Theory and Practice of Physic (1820, 2 vols.; 6th ed. 1846; 3rd American ed. 1831)
- Facts and Important Information from Distinguished Physicians and Other Sources (1842)
- Lectures on the Eruptive Fevers (1843)
