= Walter Warning =

German footballer

Personal information
- Date of birth: April 23, 1917
- Place of birth: Rostock, Germany
- Date of death: January 7, 2002 (aged 84)
- Position: Goalkeeper

Youth career
- SpVg Polizei Hamburg

Senior career*
Years	Team	Apps	(Gls)
1935–1951	Hamburger SV		
1939–1940	VfL Köln 1899		
- * Club domestic league appearances and goals

Walter Warning (23 April 1917 – 7 January 2002) was a German professional footballer, who played as a goalkeeper for Hamburger SV and VfL Köln 1899.

== Career ==
Warning, a high jump champion at junior level, joined Hamburger Sport-Verein in 1933 as a handball player. He was later converted into a football goalkeeper and became HSV's first choice goalie in 1935. With the club he won the Gauliga Nordmark in 1937, 1938 and 1939. During the Second World War he was stationed in Ukraine and rarely featured for HSV. During this period he also made appearances for VfL Köln 1899, a predecessor club to 1. FC Köln. In the post war era, Warning was again a regular player for HSV, where he won the Stadtliga Hamburg in 1946, the British Occupation Zone championship in 1947 and 1948, and the Oberliga Nord 1948, 1949 and 1950. He retired in 1950 at the age of 33, before making a brief comeback the following year as cover for the injured Otto Globisch.
