= George W. Gregory Jr. =

American politician (born 1938)

Member of the South Carolina House of Representatives from the 54th/Chesterfield County district
- In office 1967–1968
- In office 1972–1976

Personal details
- Born: June 5, 1938 (age 88) Jefferson, South Carolina
- Died: 1/3/2018
- Party: Democratic
- Occupation: lawyer

George Winfield Gregory Jr. (born June 5, 1938) is a former member of the South Carolina House of Representatives. He is a member of the Democratic Party. Gregory was born in Jefferson, South Carolina and attended Davidson College and the University of South Carolina, and was a lawyer who resided in Cheraw, South Carolina.
