= William Crawford (Louisiana politician) =

American politician

William Crawford was a state legislator in Louisiana. A land owner and a Republican, he served in the Louisiana House of Representatives from Rapides Parish from 1870-1875. The Wheeler Compromise unseated him in April 1875.
