= George Washington Gregory =

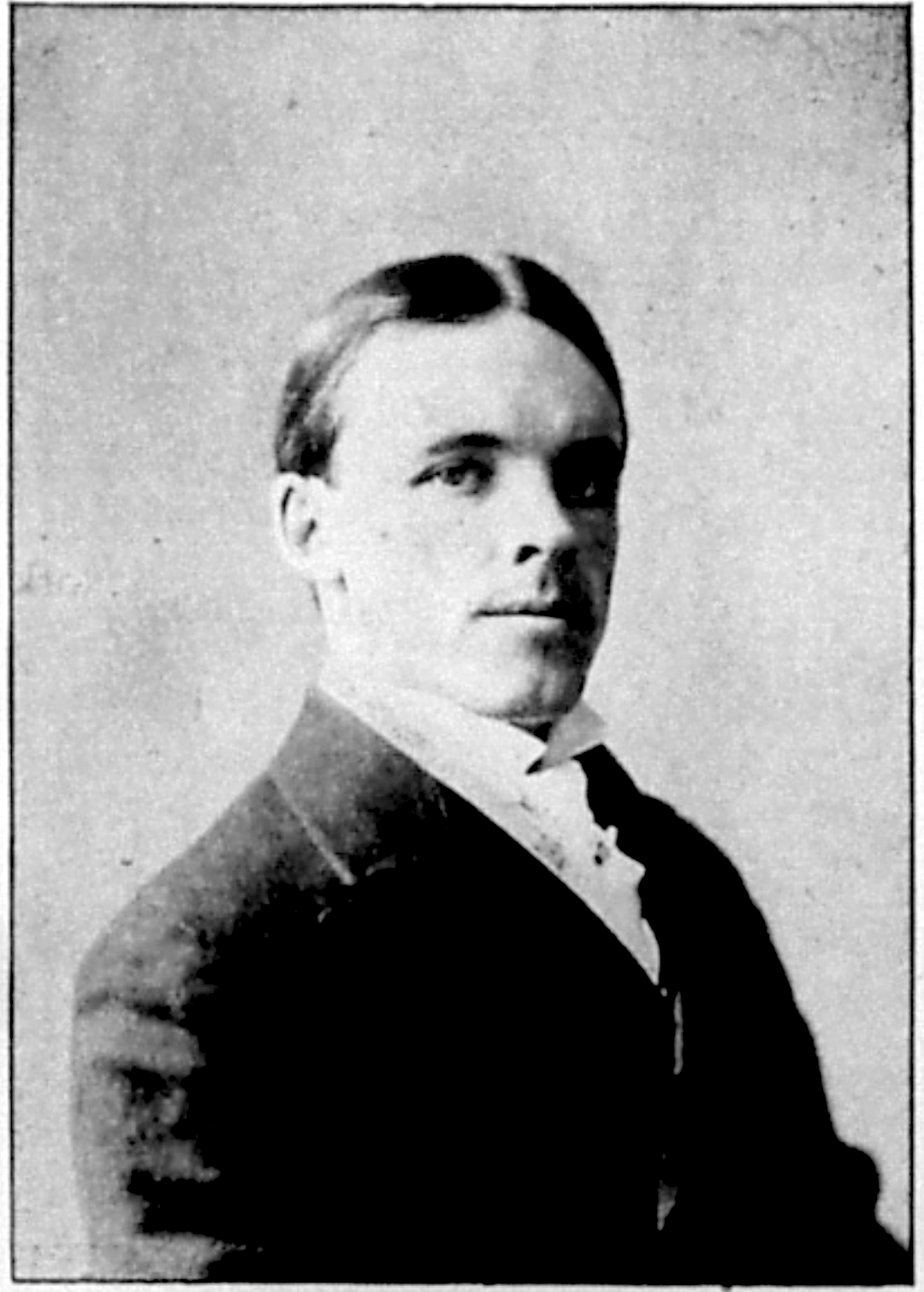
- George W. Gregory in 1893

Background information
- Born: February 15, 1867; Jersey City, New Jersey, U.S.
- Died: May 2, 1902 (aged 35) New York City, New York, U.S.
- Genre: Classical
- Occupations: Performing artist, music teacher, author
- Instrument: Banjo
- Years active: 1891–1898

George Washington Gregory (February 15, 1867 – May 2, 1902) was a banjo player, playing in the classic banjo style. A composer, he arranged classical music for the 5-string banjo. He taught the banjo as a music teacher and wrote a musical method, Practical Fingering for the Banjo, originally published in serial. For about two years he was part of the Gregory Trio, consisting of himself, W. B. Farmer and Charles Van Baar.

Gregory arranged European classical music for the banjo, which he and his trio would play. His choice of music made him part of the same musical movement as Alfred A. Farland, William A. Huntley, and S. S. Stewart, men "elevating" the banjo by appearing with the banjo in formal dress and playing music suitable for the parlor.

The European classical works that Gregory arranged for the banjo include Wagner's Grand March from Tannhauser, Listz's Rhapsodie Hongroise No. 2, Moszkowski's Boleros and Spanish Dances.

He began a performing career about 1891, performing alongside top performers of his day. His performing career may have been cut short by an injury to his hand in mid-1893. For a time he continued to teach music, listed as a banjo teacher through October 1898. He committed suicide in 1902.

== Background ==
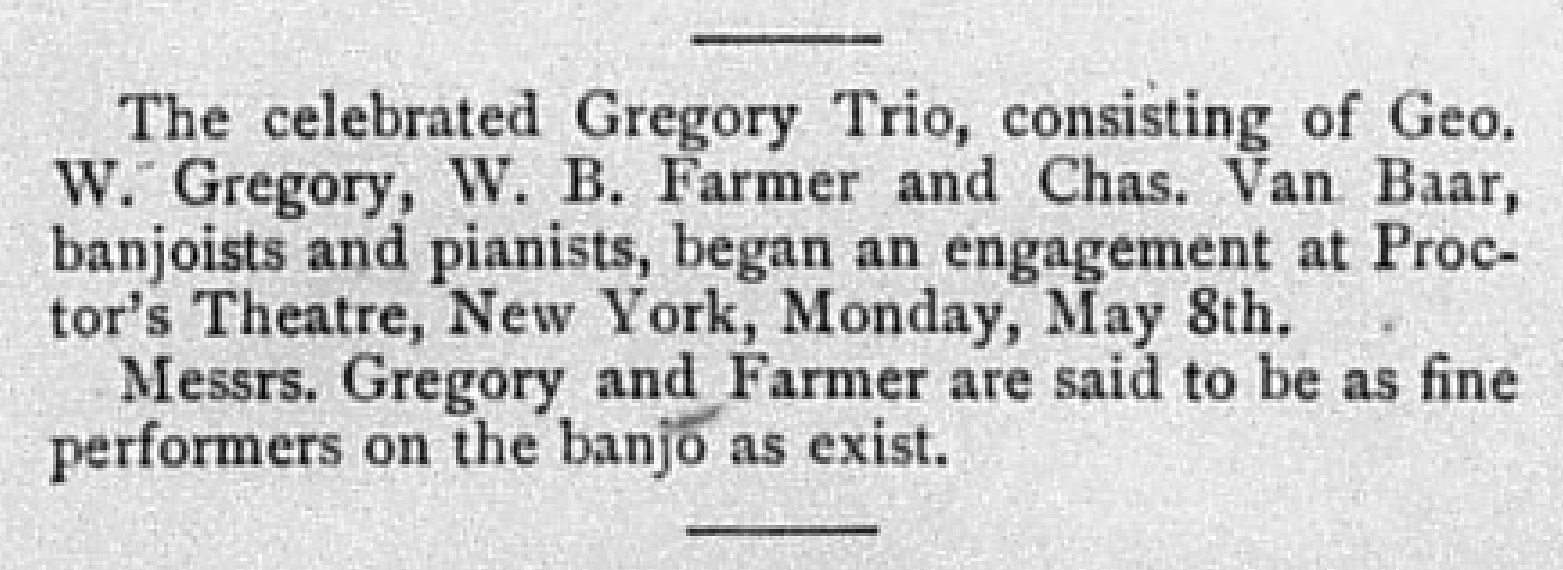
Promotion, Gregory Trio at Proctor's Theatre, May 8, 1893

George W. Gregory was a grandson of Dudley S. Gregory, the first mayor of Jersey City and a congressman.

George grew up in New Jersey. His father Dudley S. Gregory, Jr. was the founder and president of the New Jersey Philharmonic Society, his mother an amateur singer. His father died in 1886, and in the mid-1880s) George went to Grafton, New Mexico to work on a cattle ranch and remained there for seven years. The job gave him time to practice playing the banjo for as much as three hours a day. About 1891 he returned to the East Coast.

He was given a national introduction to readers of S. S. Stewart's Banjo and Guitar Journal in the August–September 1893 issue, including his first piece of published sheet music, L'Infata March. The appearance marked the beginning of his appearance in the journal, in which Stewart talked about prominent banjo players and printed letters from around the country which mentioned them by name. The promotions went both ways, as Stewart was able to self-promote by talking about the banjos that the players used. Gregory used an S. S. Stewart Thoroughbred banjo (instruments picked out in the factory for their tone and playability and marketed to professionals) and a "Stewart Champion" banjo.

== Performance ==
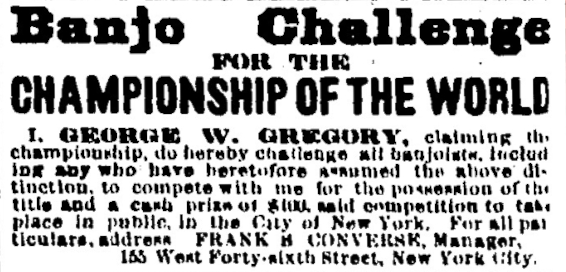
Ad from January 1891 for banjo contest, George W. Gregory, for World Championship. This ad puts in place the title Champion Banjoist of the World onto Gregory, a gimmic that he and Frank B. Converse would use in their next advertisement.

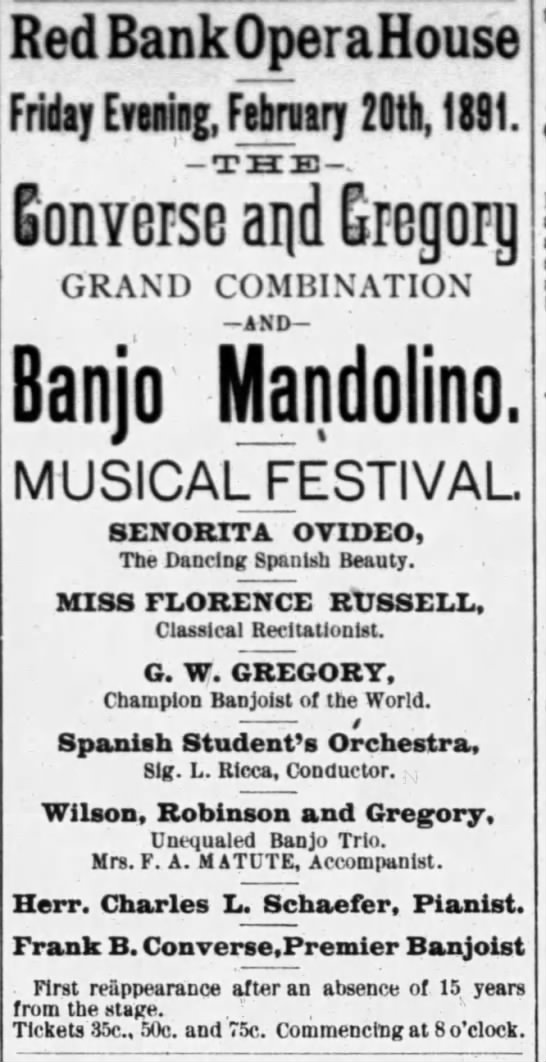
Ad for show put on by Frank Converse and George W. Gregory, February 1891

In January 1891, an advertisement appeared in the New York Clipper trade magazine, a banjo-playing challenge by George W. Gregory to anyone who wanted to contend for the "Championship of the World." Those wanting to respond to the ad were directed to Gregory's "manager," Frank B. Converse.

In February 1891, labeling himself the "Champion Banjoist of the World", Gregory teamed up with Converse in Red Bank, New Jersey to form the Converse and Gregory Grand Combination. The combination featured the banjo players, a former member of Carlo Curti's Spanish Students, Sig. Luigi Ricca (leading his own Spanish Student group), the Spanish dancer Signora Ovideo, and classical recitationist Florence Russell.

Converse was an established banjo player who wrote several banjo instruction books. His books were the first to teach the "guitar style" of playing banjo, a style which the classic banjoists (including Gregory) used. The style is also called "classic fingerstyle" today. The show was advertised as Converse's first trip to the stage in 15 years.

Gregory performed in the act, part of the trio of Wilson, Robinson and Gregory.

In January 1892, he was advertised in the news, solo, "one of New York's most talented banjoists". He was one of many acts playing back-to-back without a break in the entertainment.

In the fall of 1892, Gregory started a new group, the Gregory Trio. They played private engagements and worked into New York's theater and club industry. By August 1893, the trio had performed for 10 weeks on Broadway as part of the musical A Trip to Chinatown. Other engagements by August 1893 included 3 weeks at the Vaudeville Club and a week at Proctor's Theatre (Proctor had 3 theaters in New York in the early 1890s).

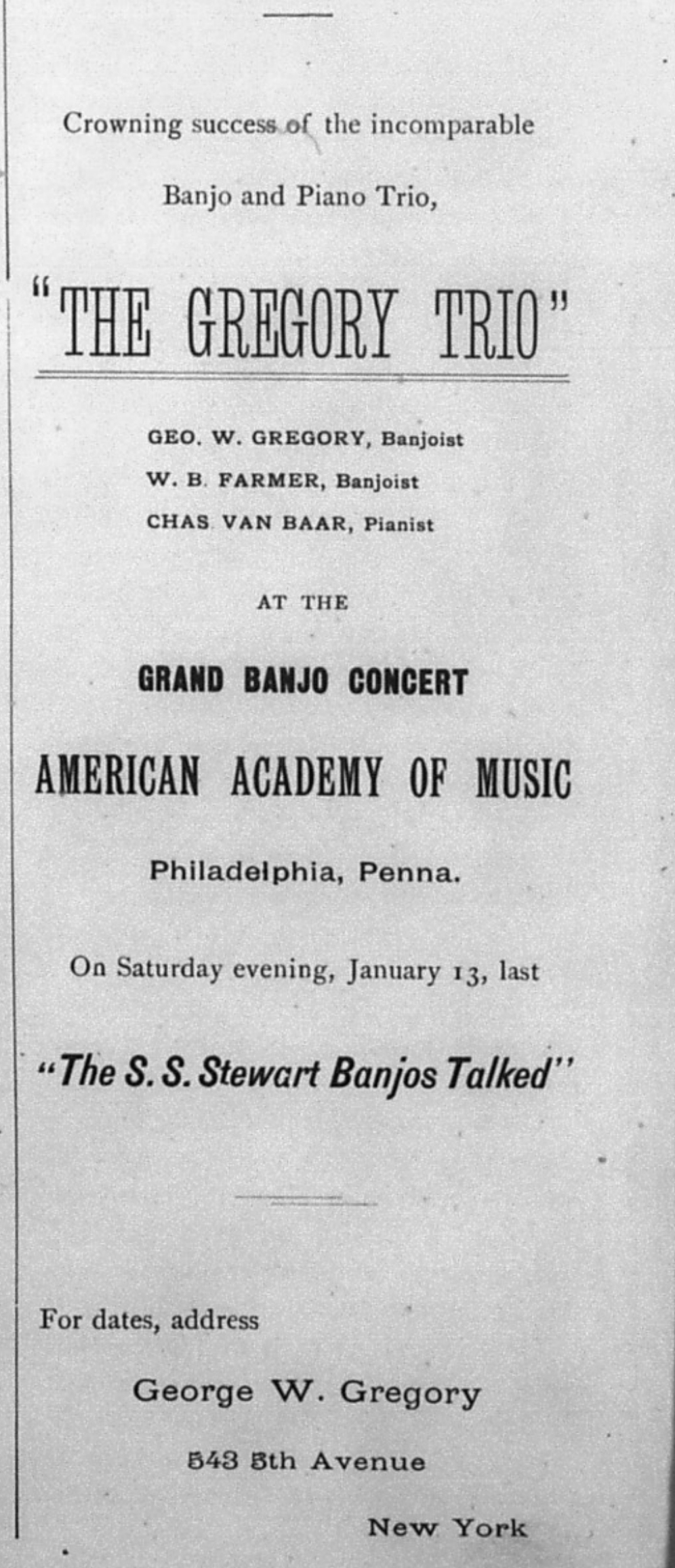
The Gregory Trio, advertisement, 1894

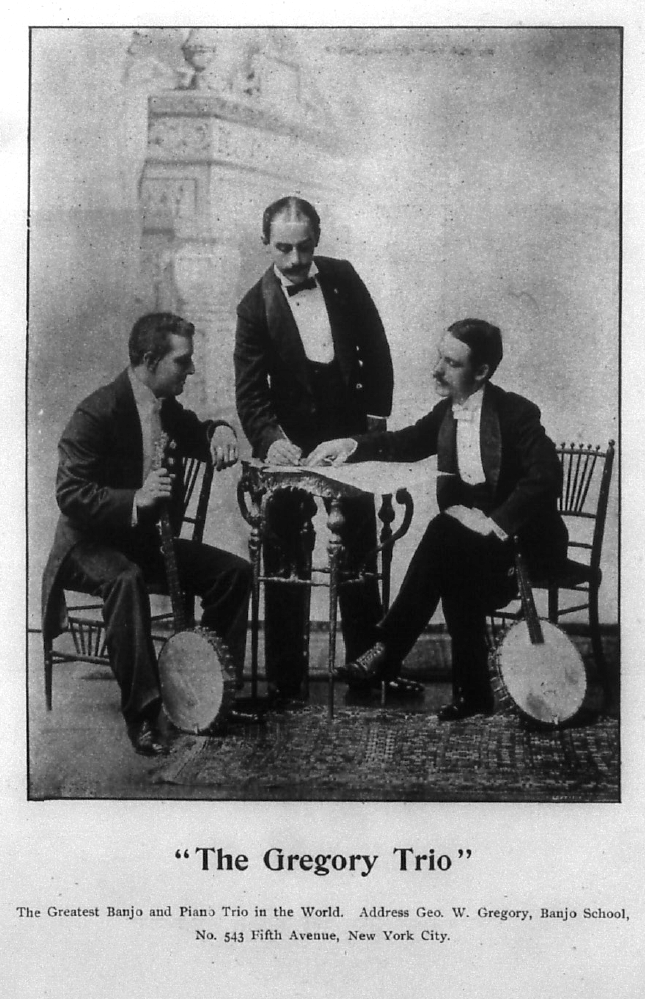
Gregory Trio, 1893. (From left) William B. "Billy" Farmer, Charles Van Baar, George W. Gregory.

From October 1893 through February 1894, he did multiple concerts with Alfred A. Farland. S. S. Stewart paid attention to him in Stewart's journal for a time, in the same way he promoted Farland. However, Gregory's performing career did not last as long as Farland's, who was persistently advertised by the journal for many years. Gregory's performing career in the journal and in newspapers lasted from 1891-1895.

Carnival of Venice, variations on the folk song composed by Julius Benedict, arranged for banjo and played on banjo by Alfred A. Farland. This song is an example of Farland using tremolo to get long notes from the instrument (much as the cornet or violin can naturally play.) The effect is a different sounding banjo to Gregory's.

Recording of "Infanta March" - played by Fred Van Eps - Written by George W. Gregory. Gregory got good reactions in the press to his performance of marches.

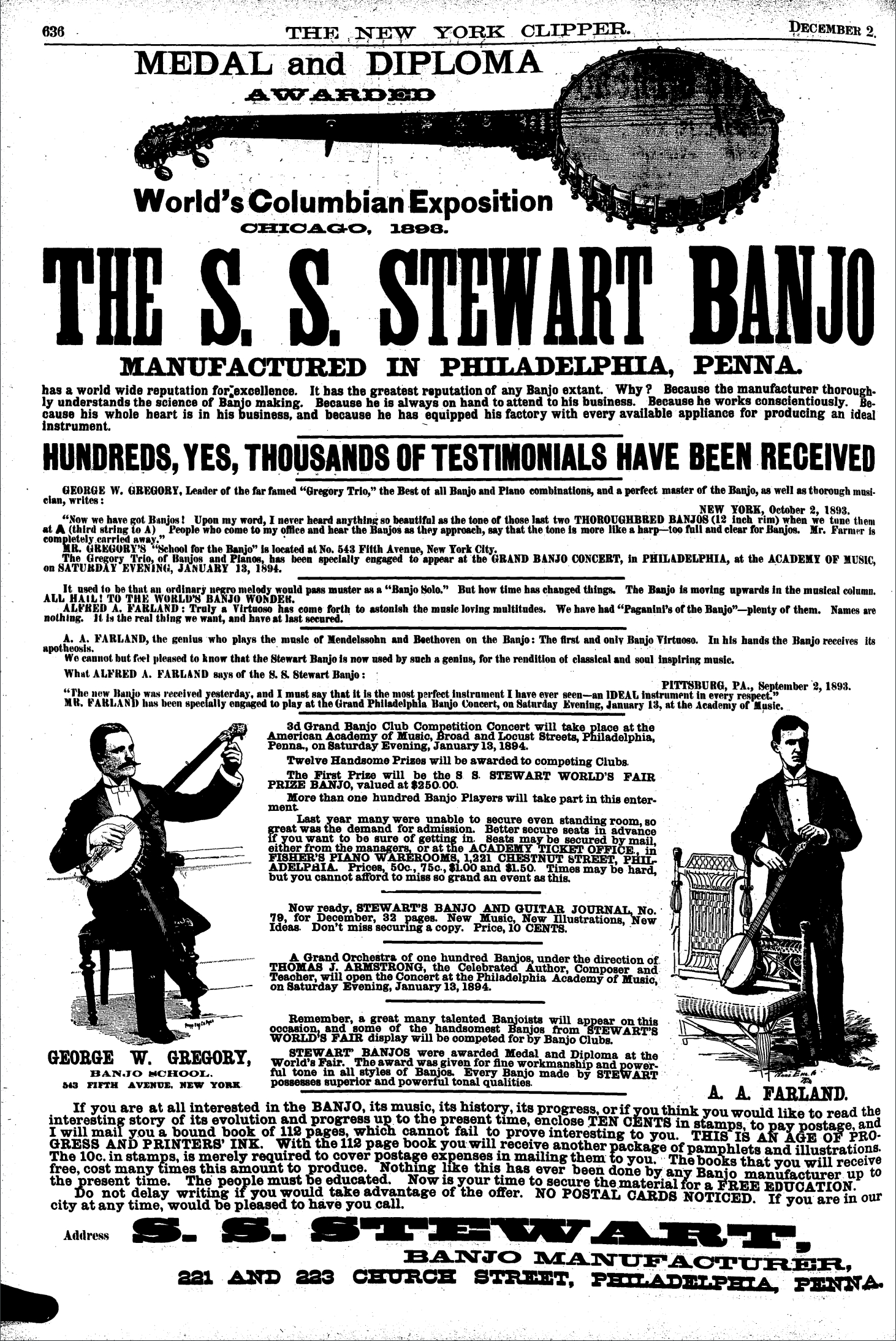
George W Gregory & Alfred A Farland in a full page advertisement in the New York Clipper by S. S. Stewart, 2 Dec 1893

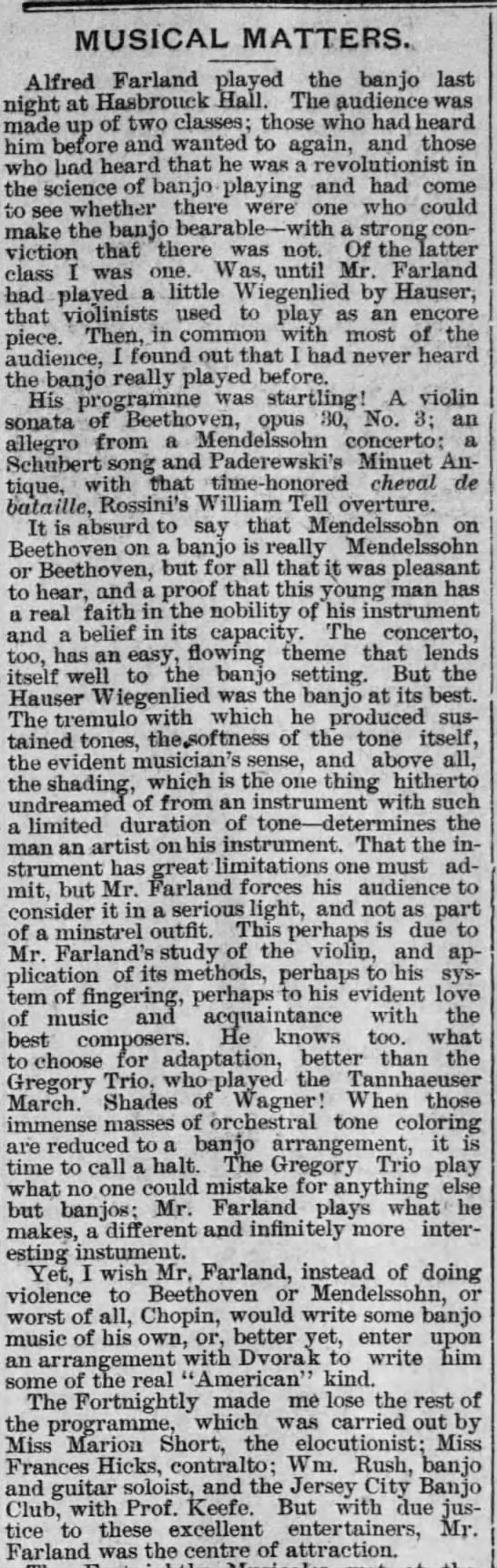
Review of concert with Alfred A. Farland and George W. Gregory, 13 January 1894.

A critic in 1894, compared the two, saying that Farland had a better understanding of what would sound good on the banjo, choosing works where technique could bring credit to the instrument, making the listener forget the banjo. With Gregory, "The Gregory Trio play what no one could mistake for anything but banjos," (Tannhaeuser March, by Wagner) because they chose works requiring "immense masses of orchestral tone coloring."

Then the critic reversed himself, saying that he wished Farland would write banjo music (that actually sounded like a banjo).

=== Changes ===
Gregory suffered an injury to his right hand in mid-1893. By the summer of 1894 he lost the use of his second finger. There is little or no mention of him performing after 1895, although he continued to advertise as an instructor for the banjo, advertising as late as October 1898.

Farmer, who had been one of Gregory's students for about two years before joining him as a performance partner, broke off on his own, as did the pianist, Van Baar. Farmer and Van Baar joined the Dore brothers, forming the group Dore, Farmer and Dore after 1895. Farmer continued to play, joining Vess Ossman in 1903 to record "Bill Bailey (Won't You Please Come Home)" and another tune in 1906, "St. Louis Tickle." He formed a banjo trio with Vess Ossman and Parke Hunter in 1904.

In about 1899, Gregory went into retail sales in the music department of a department store, S. F. Meyers and Company.

In spite of being off the performance track, he retained a following in the banjo world. Gregory was still admired in December 1899 by a S. S. stewarts's Banjo and Guitar Journal reader who placed him musically alongside Farland, Vess Ossman, Paul Eno, and Ruby Brooks, saying that these banjo players had "acquired the very essential correct fingering,"

Gregory had worked out his own variation guitar-style or classic style of banjo playing. He created a banjo method which taught his method, focusing on using the thumb and all four fingers of the right hand in sounding the strings. He continued to write his method and have it printed by Stewart's journal, the lessons running from issue 87 through issue 97. Gregory's Practical Fingering method received repeated mention by readers who wrote to S. S. Stewart. Stewart was able to sell reprints of the serial, and the method was sold as a unit due 60 cents. He was due to begin another series when Stewart died in 1898; the second series never ran.

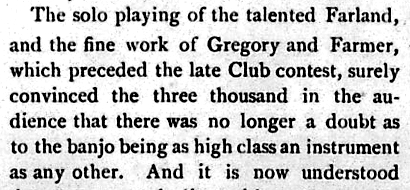
George W. Gregory, W. B. Farmer, and Alfred A. Farland were described as elevating the banjo.

Gregory's identity as a musician was not as obvious by 1900, when he was working as a "manager," listed in the U.S. census with his wife and two children.

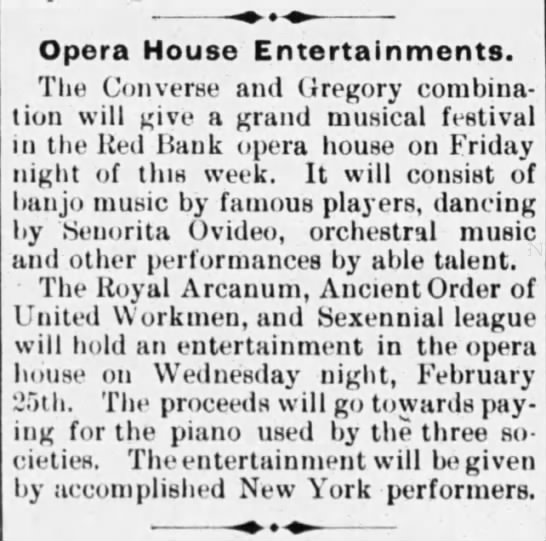
Frank Converse and George W. Gregory put on a show, advertisement, February 1891

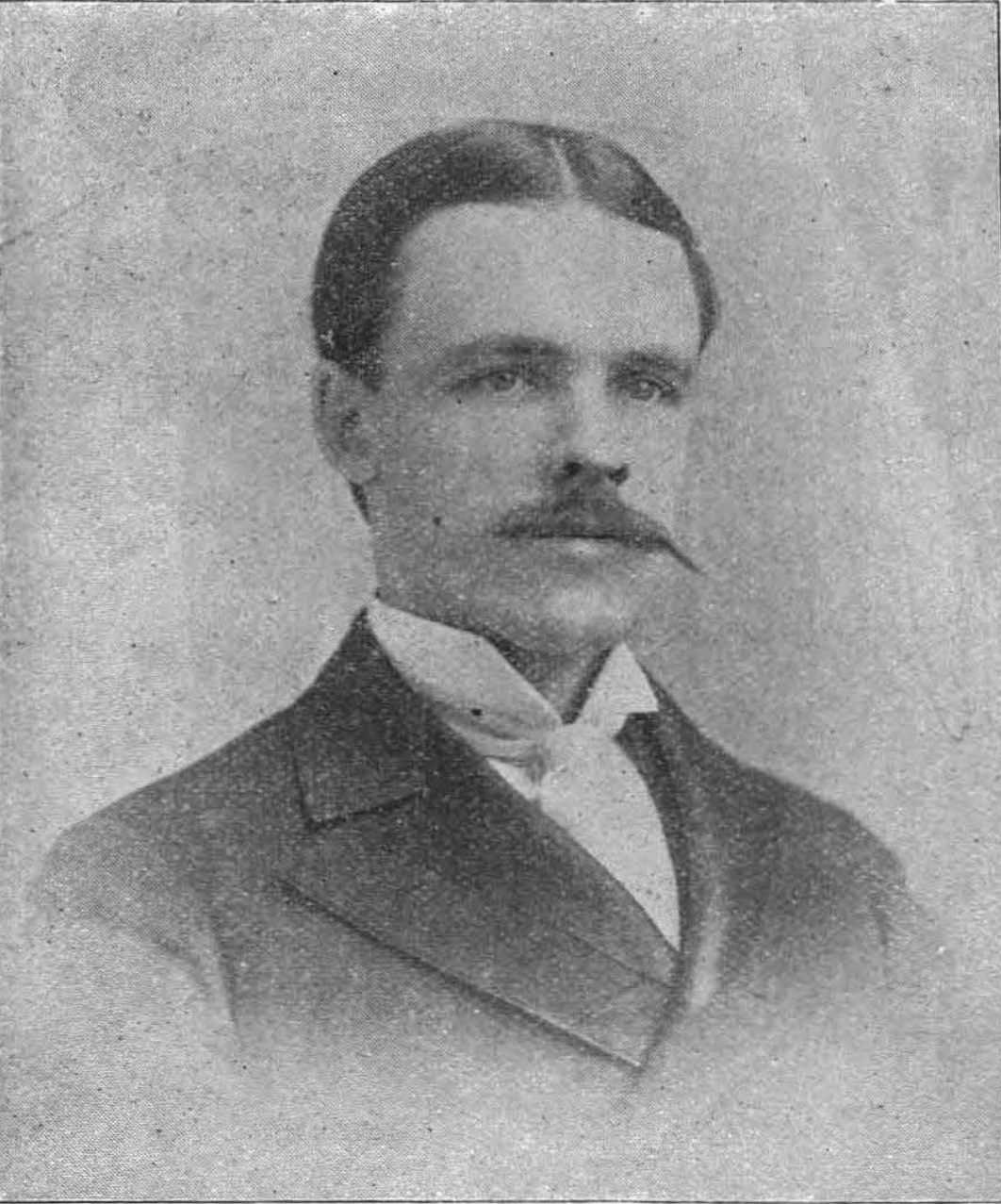
George W. Gregory, 1894

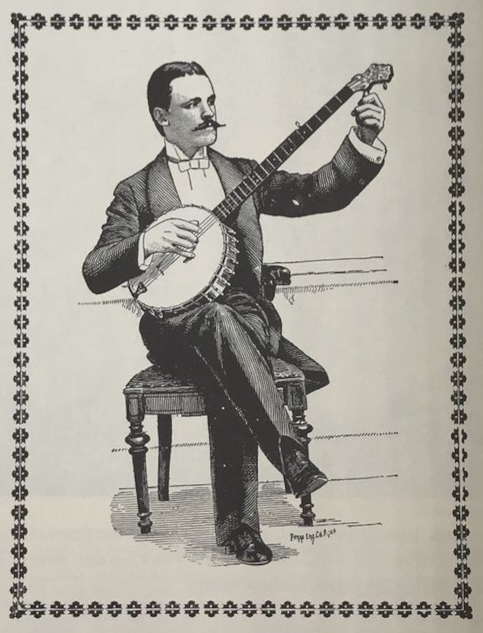
Portrait of banjoist George W. Gregory, from the S. S. Stewart 1896 catalog.

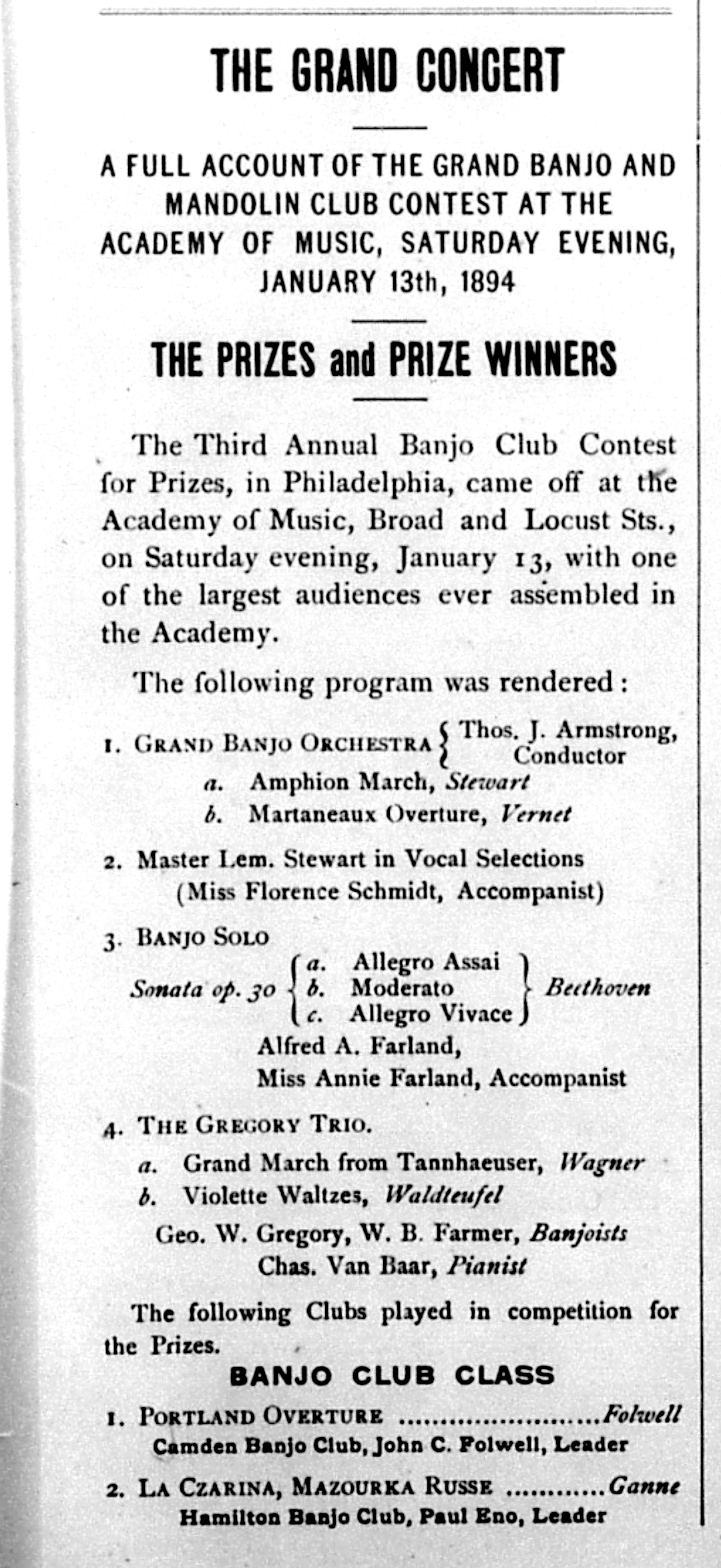
Banjo concert, Armstrong, Farland, Gregory

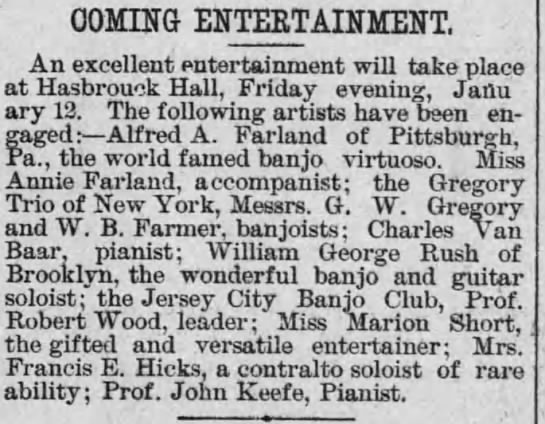
Ad naming banjoists at New Jersey concert, 23 December 1893

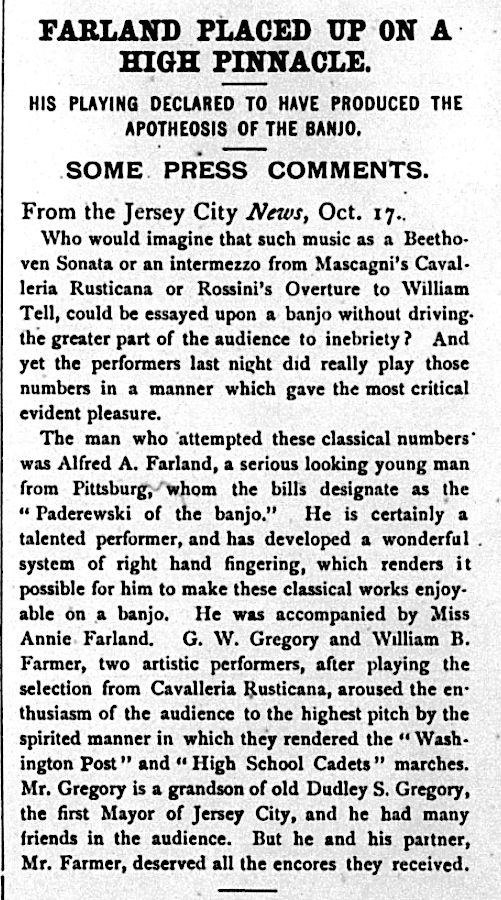
George W. Gregory, Alfred A. Farland, concert October 17, 1893.

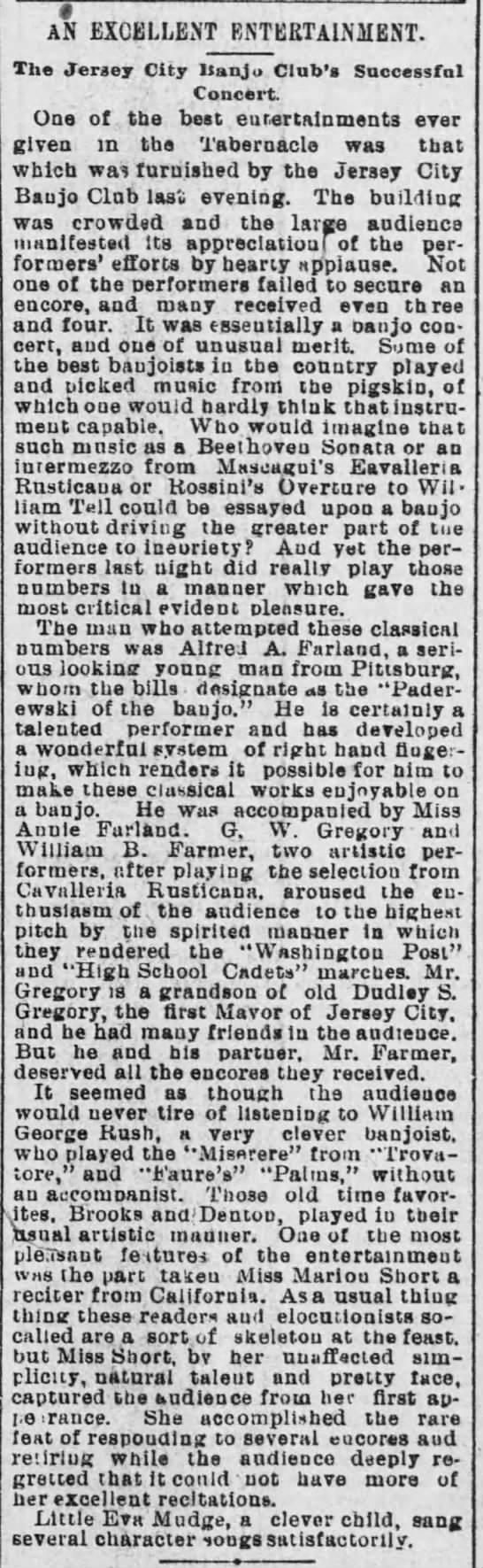
Jersey City Banjo Club Concert, 17 October 1893

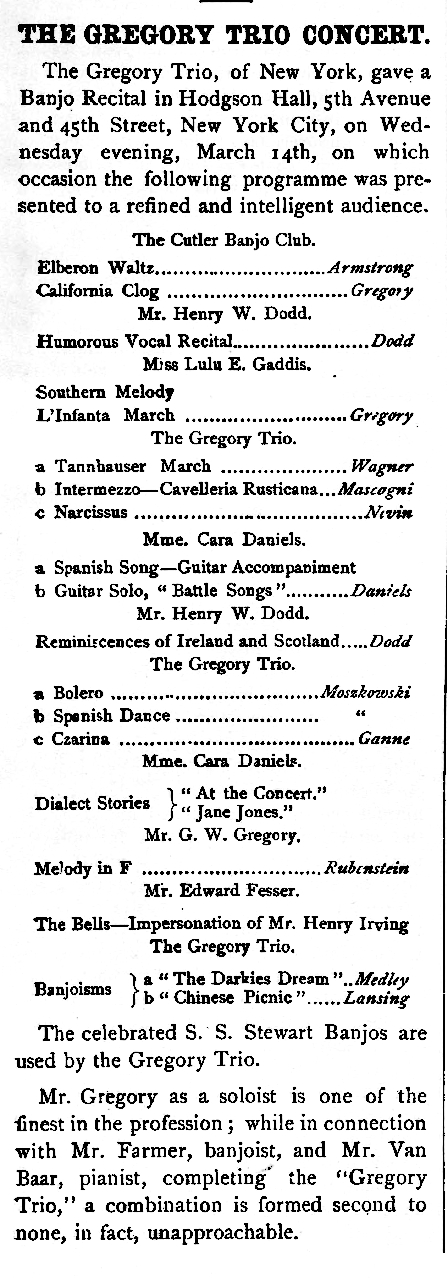
Gregory Trio, Concert 14 March 1894.

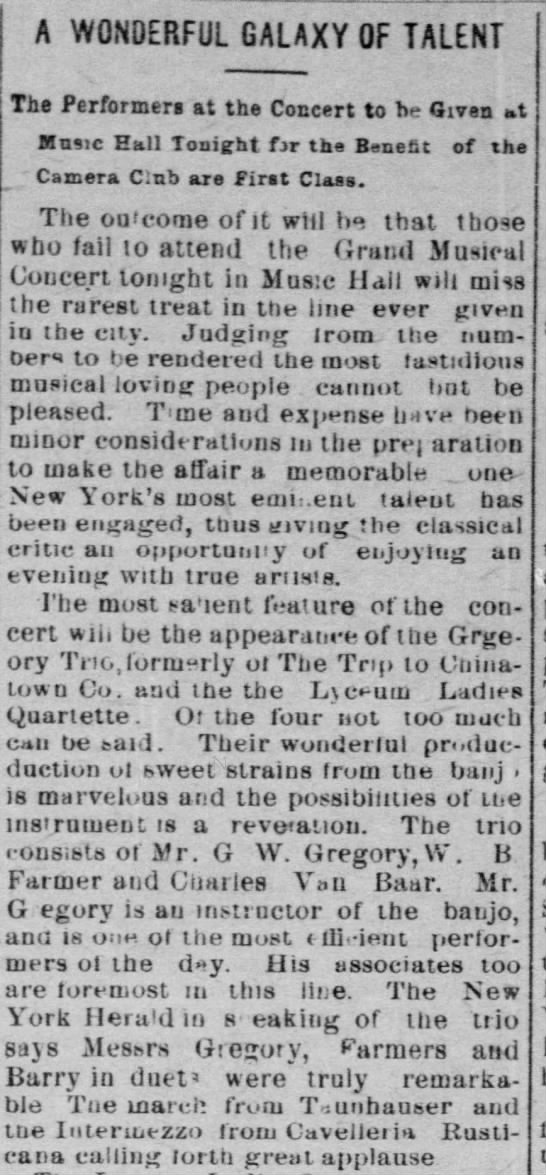
Review, Gregory Trio Concert, Bridgewater, New Jersey, 2 November 1894

== Tragic end ==
Gregory followed the example that his father had set, meeting an unpleasant end. His father had wasted most of his inheritance, been separated from his wife, and at the end may have been insane, drinking and dying of liver carcinoma.

Gregory was reported to have stolen from his employer and fled to Cuba in January 1902. When he returned about the beginning of May, his was wife was working for a living, suing for divorce, and his children living in an orphan asylum. Having fled from the officer come to arrest him in January, he was a fugitive. He shot himself in the head at a saloon on May 2, 1902. It was written of him that before he killed himself, he played the Dance of Death on his favorite banjo.

== Recordings ==
His work, L'Infanta March was played by classic style banjoist Fred Van Eps in 1913, on the album Infanta March, issued on Edison Blue Amberol records.

== Compositions and arrangements ==
- Narcisus by Ethelbert Nevin
- Cavalleria rusticana, Intermezzo, by Pietro Mascagni
- Liberty Bell March, by John Philip Sousa
- Washington Post, by Sousa.
- The High School Cadets, by Sousa.
- Tannhaeuser March, by Wagner.
- In the Valley
- Les Sylphes, by Georges Bachmann
- Cocoanut dance, by Andrew Herman
- Spanish Dances, by Moritz Moszkowski
- L'Infanta March, by George W. Gregory
- Rapsody Hongroise Number 2, by Liszt
- Violette Waltzes, by Émile Waldteufel
- La Czarina, by Louis Ganne
- California Clog, played by George W. Gregory Possibly arranged by Frank Converse.
- Selections from La Perrichole, by Jacques Offenbach, arranged by George W. Gregory

=== Sheet music ===
==== L'Infanta March ====
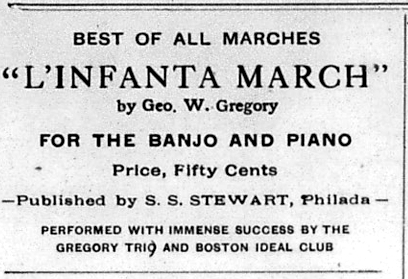
Advertisement L'Infanta March, for banjo, by George W. Gregory.

Two versions of L'Infanta March. The first version was published in S. S. Stewart's Banjo and Guitar Journal, August–September 1893. The journal featured music for those learning to play the banjo; the version he played on stage may have been more complicated. The second version was by a music publisher, Cammeyer Music and Manufacturing.

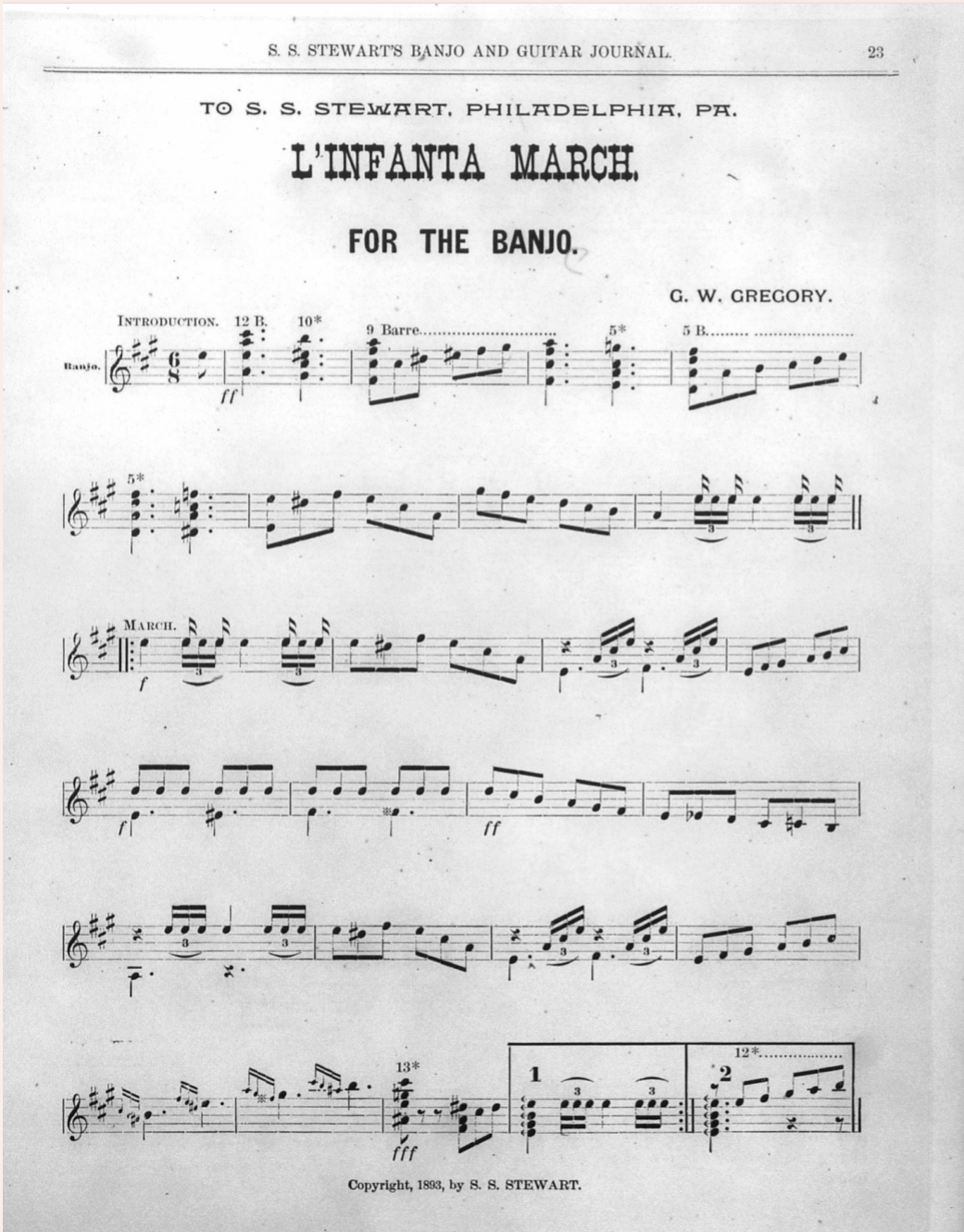
L'Infanta March by George W. Gregory, page 1.

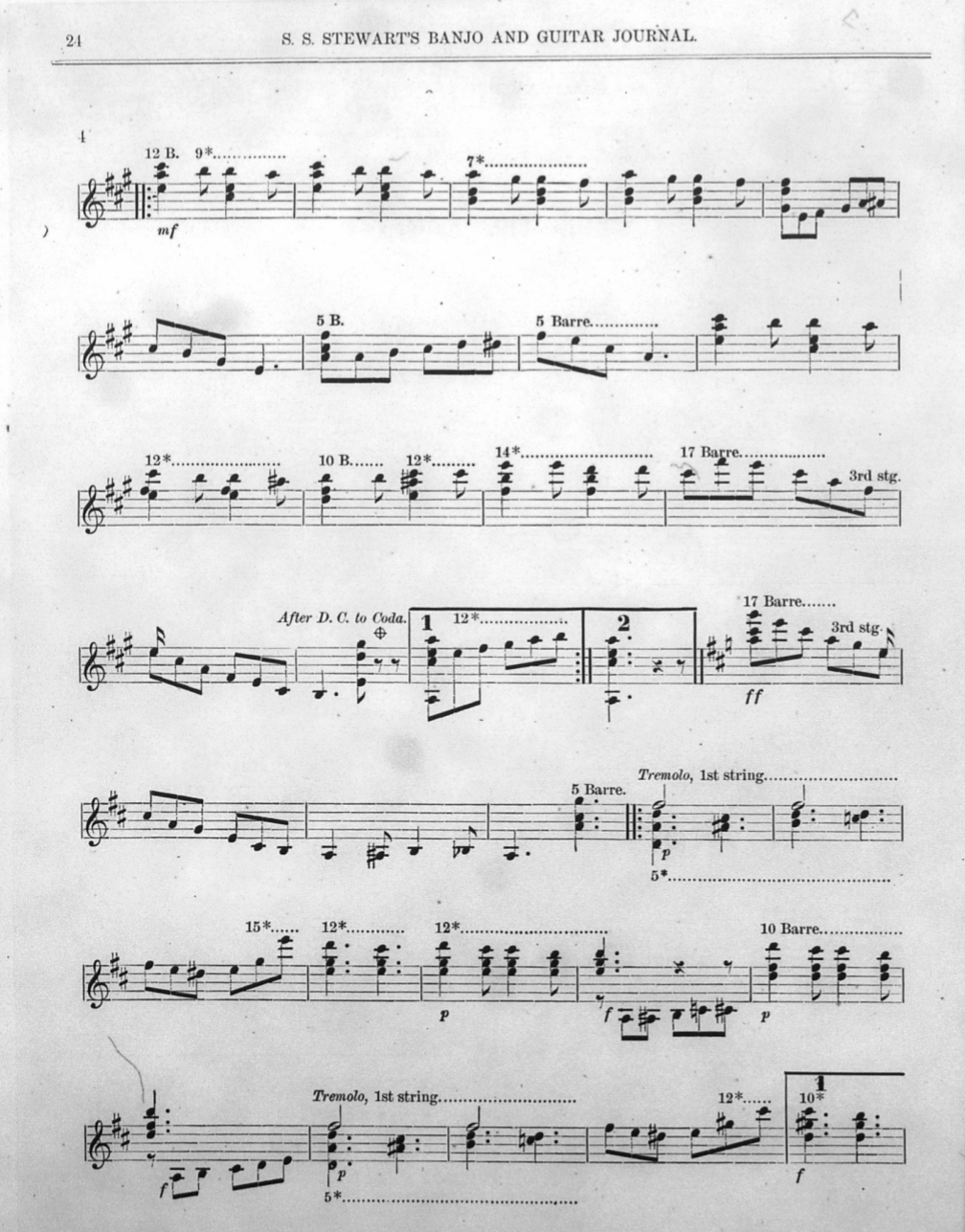
L'Infanta March, page 2.

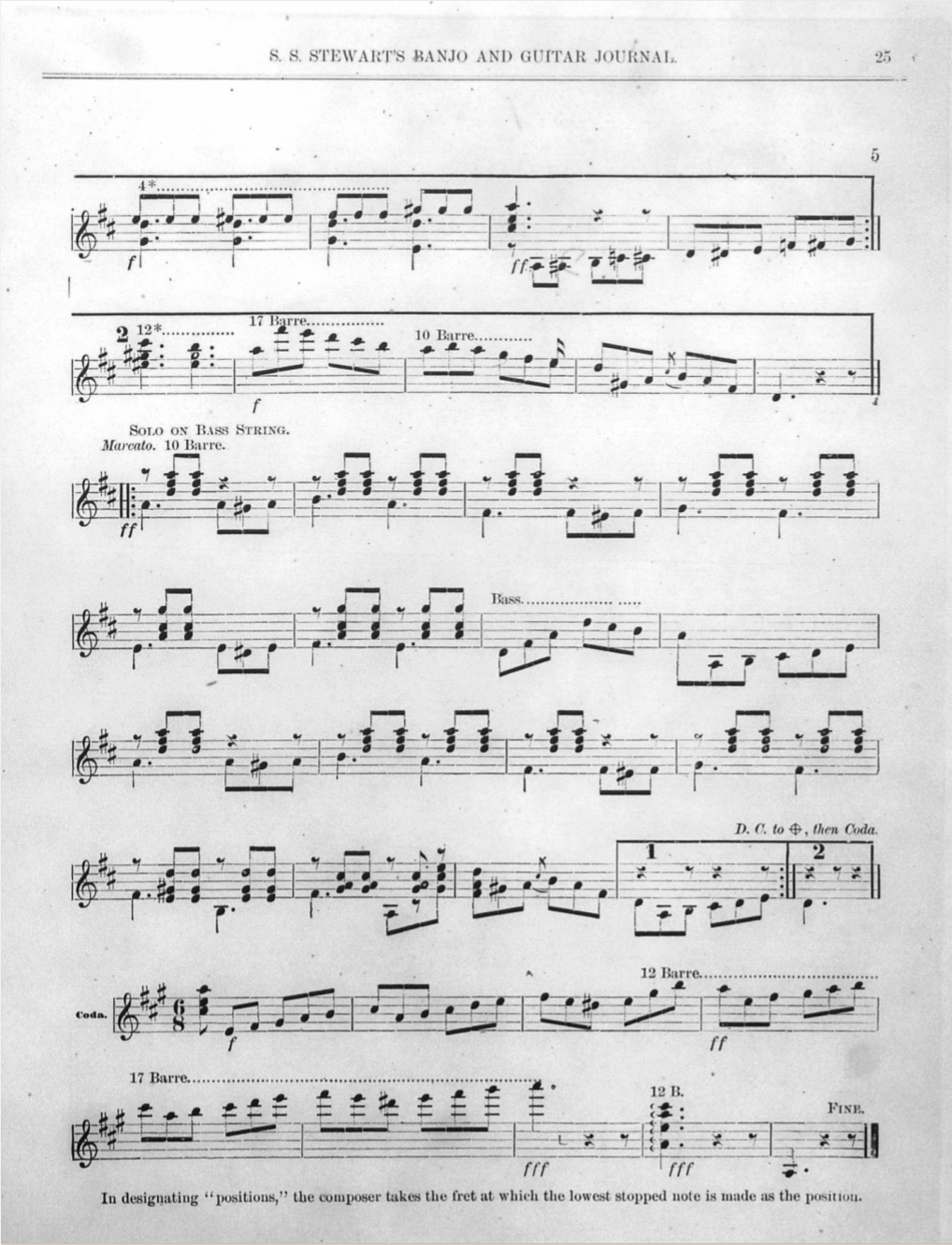
L'Infanta March, page 3.

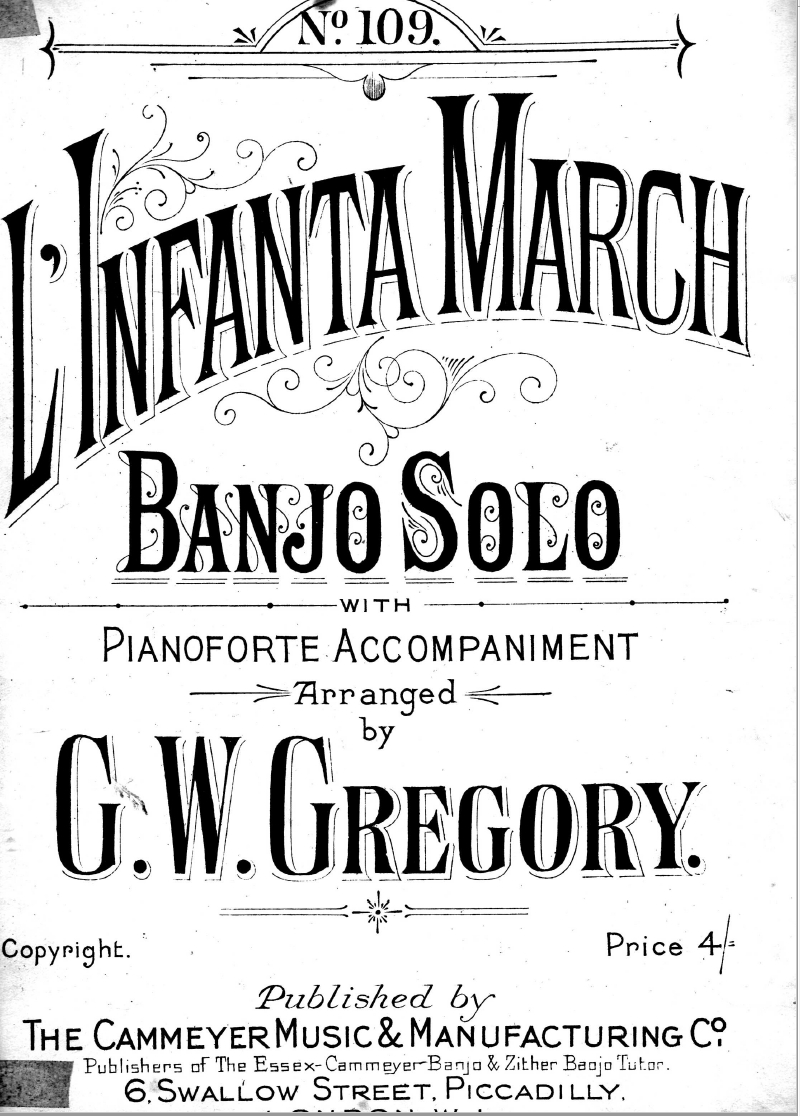
L'Infanta March by George W. Gregory, title page

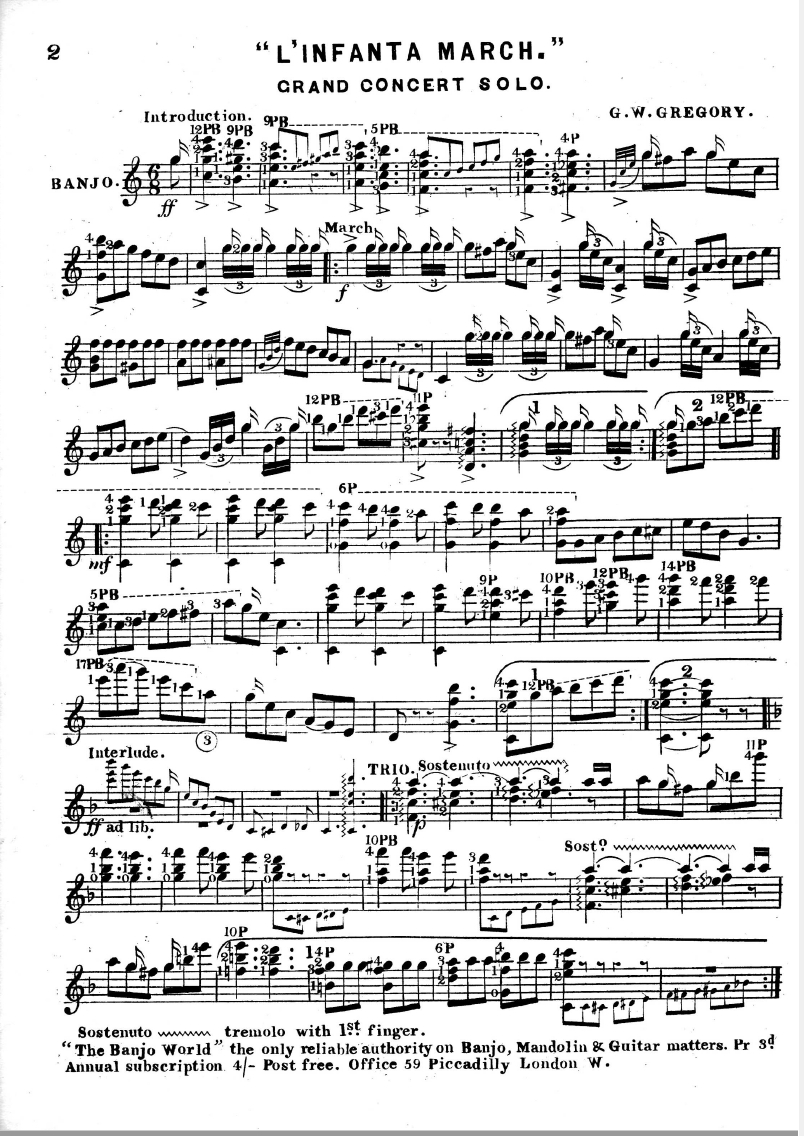
L'Infanta March by George W. Gregory, page 1

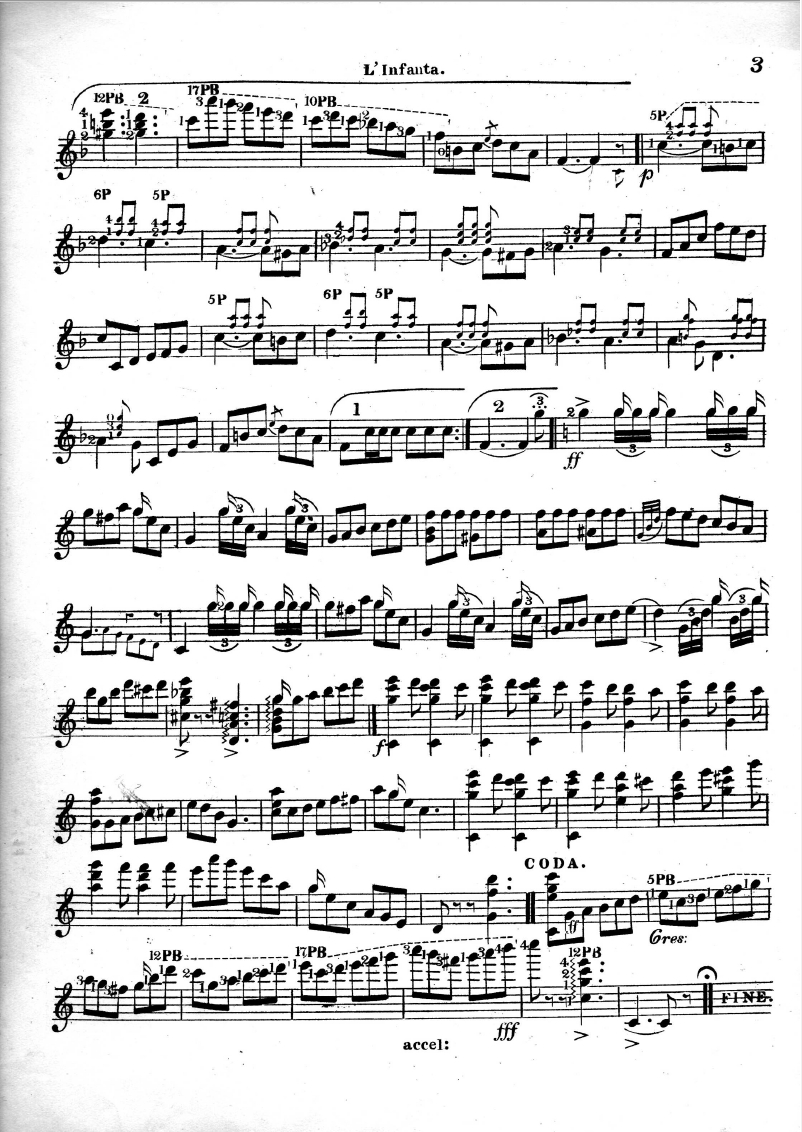
L'Infanta March by George W. Gregory, page 2

==== Cocoanut Dance ====
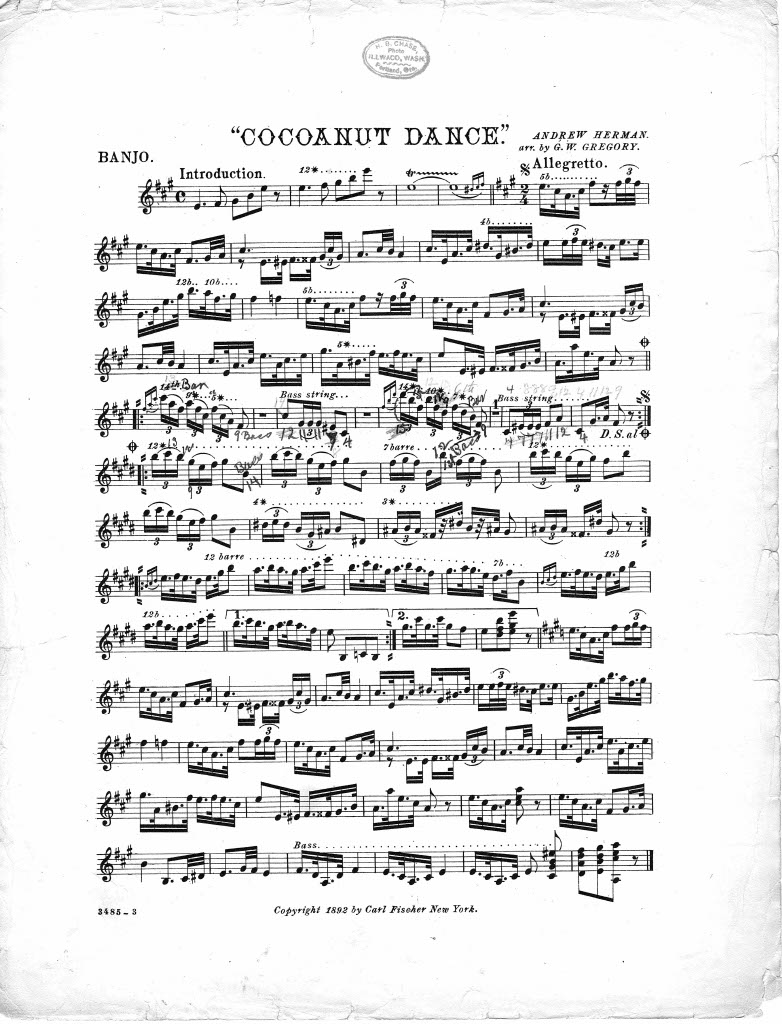
Cocoanut Dance, Banjo solo in A notation. Composed by Andrew Herman and arranged by George W. Gregory

==== La Czarina ====
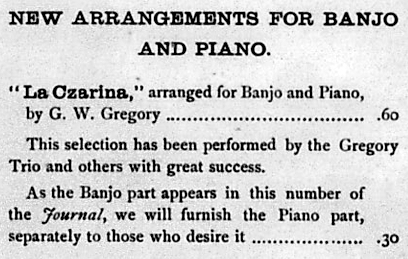
Advertisement, sheet music for La Czarina, arranged by G. W. Gregory.

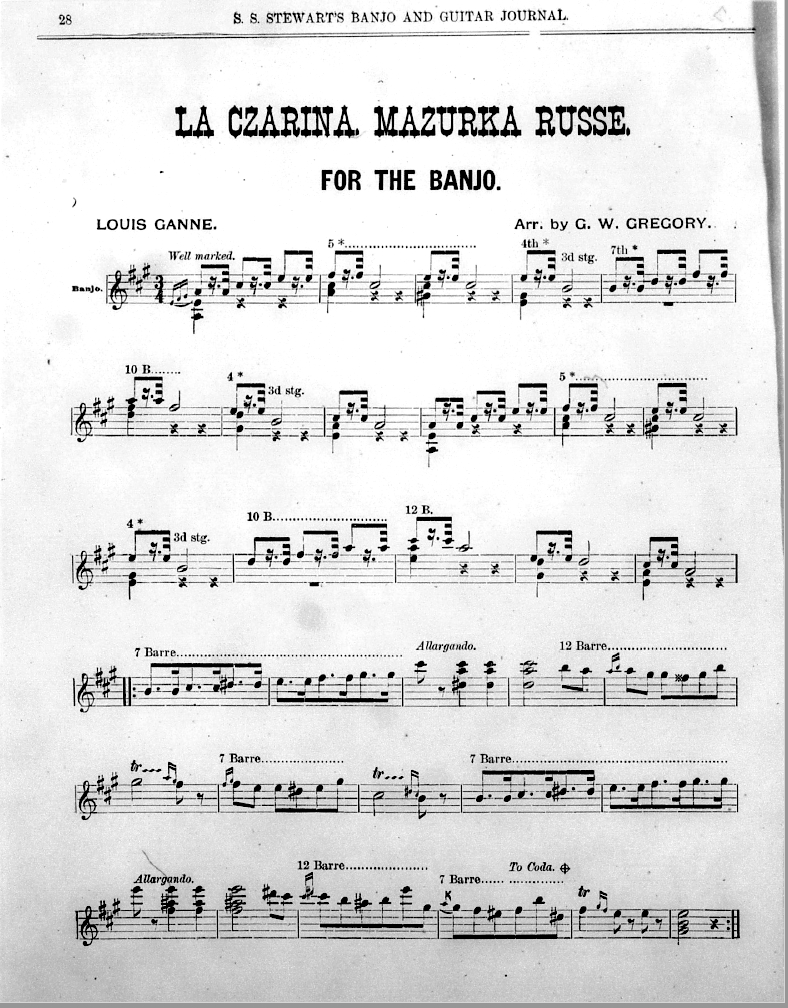
La Czarina by Louis Ganne, arranged for banjo by George W. Gregory, page 1

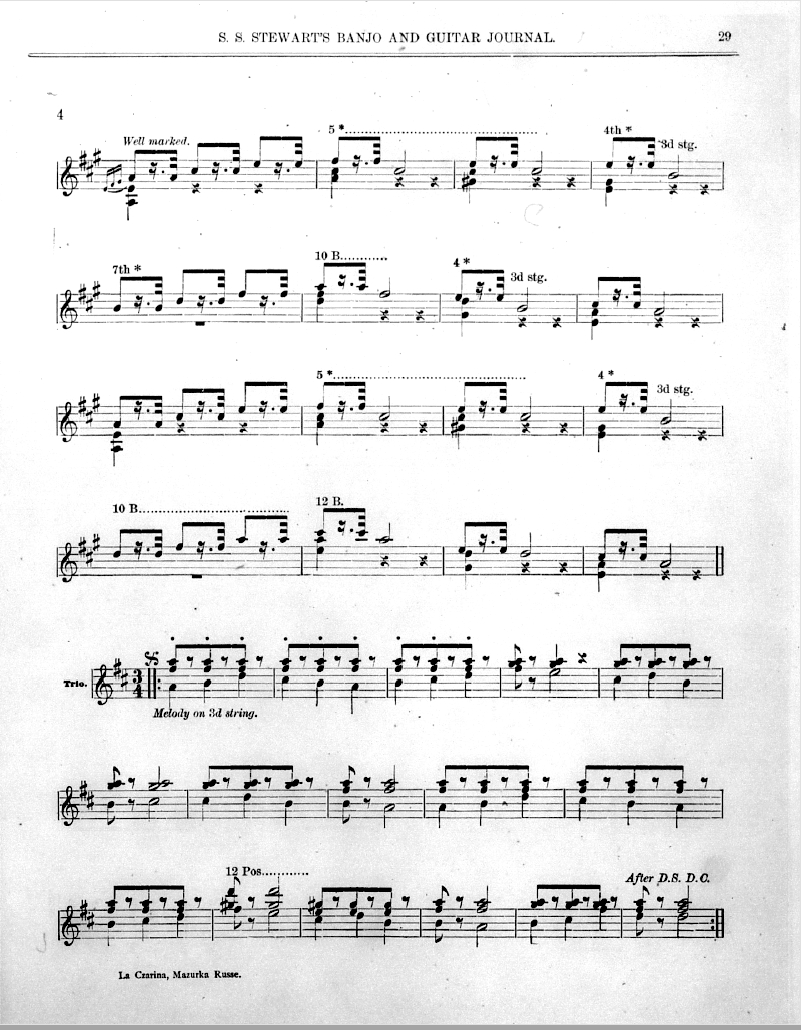
La Czarina by Louis Ganne, arranged for banjo by George W. Gregory, page 2

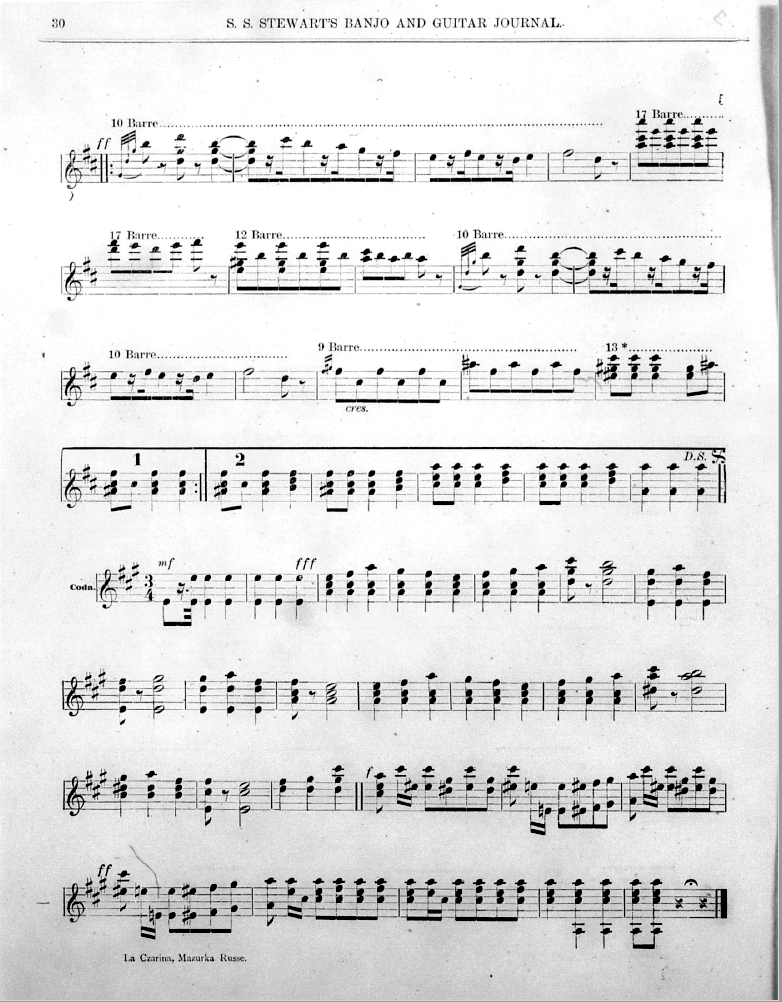
La Czarina by Louis Ganne, arranged for banjo by George W. Gregory, page 3

== Teaching methods ==
- Practical fingering for the Banjo published in S. S. Stewart's Banjo and Guitar Journal, issues 87-97
- Technical studies and foundation exercises named in S. S. Stewart's Banjo and Guitar Journal as upcoming, shortly before Stewart's death. May not have been published.
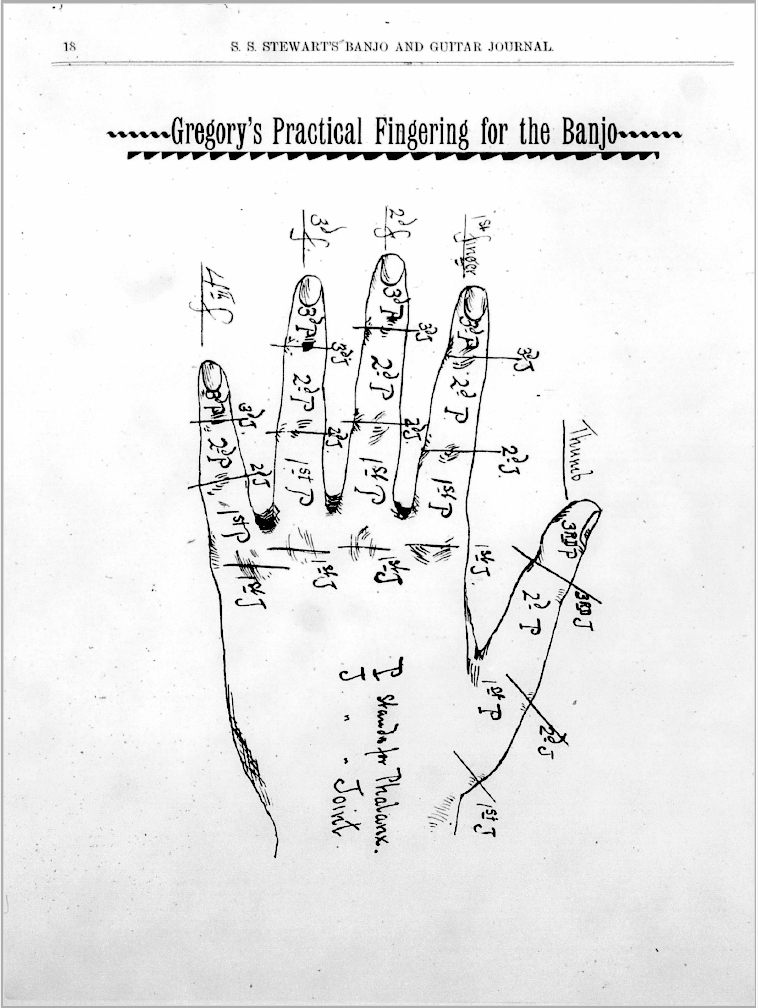
Gregory, practical fingering for the banjo.

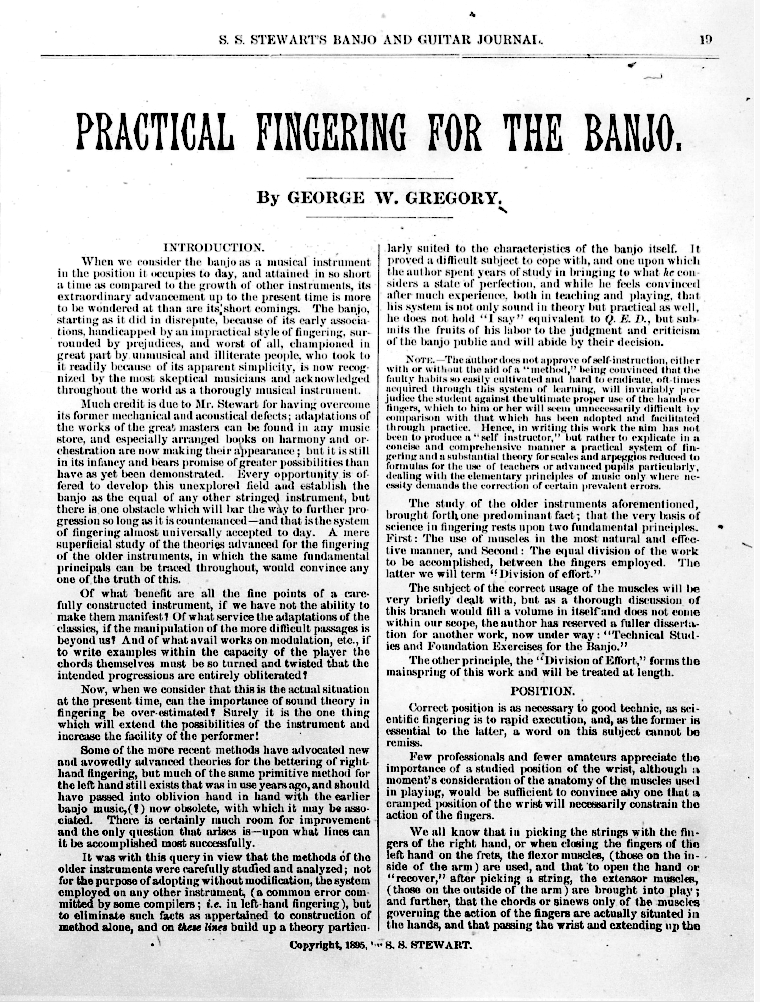
Gregory, practical fingering for the banjo, 2nd page.

== Addresses ==
Addresses listed by S. S. Stewart as places that Gregory advertised as his place of teaching:

- 543 5th Ave NYC 1892-Feb 1895 (Found in 1892 city directory, SS Stewarts Banjo & Guitar Journal issue 83-issue 85)
- 55 W. 42nd, NYC Feb 1895-Dec 1895 (Found in issue86-issue 90)
- 57 W. 42nd, NYC Dec 1895-June 1896 (Found in issue 91-issue 93)
- 1147 Broadway, NYC June 1896-Dec 1897 (Found in issue 94-issue 102)
- 44 W Thirtieth St, NYC Dec 1897- at least Dec 1898, the last month the teacher's address list was published. (Found in issue 103-issue 109)
