= Joseph Humpage =

English footballer

Personal information
- Full name: Joseph Humpage
- Date of birth: 22 September 1873
- Place of birth: Wednesbury, England
- Date of death: 1953 (aged 79–80)
- Position: Goalkeeper

Senior career*
Years	Team	Apps	(Gls)
1892–1893	Wednesbury Old Athletic		
1893–1896	West Bromwich Albion	4	(0)
1896–1897	Burton Wanderers	7	(0)
1897	Hereford Thistle		
1898	Stourbridge		
Total		11	(0)
- * Club domestic league appearances and goals

Joseph Humpage (22 September 1873 – 1953) was an English footballer who played in the Football League for Burton Wanderers and West Bromwich Albion.
