= George Gregory (footballer) =

English footballer

Personal information
- Date of birth: 1873
- Place of birth: Hyde, Greater Manchester, England
- Position: Full-back

Senior career*
Years	Team	Apps	(Gls)
1893–1894	Grimsby Town	1	(0)
- * Club domestic league appearances and goals

George Gregory (1873 – after 1893) was an English professional footballer who played as a full-back.
