= Bill Crawford (footballer) =

English footballer

Personal information
- Full name: William Alfred Crawford
- Date of birth: 8 May 1872
- Place of birth: Darlington, England
- Date of death: 1955 (aged 82–83)
- Position: Inside forward

Senior career*
Years	Team	Apps	(Gls)
1892–1893	Stockton		
1893–1894	Grimsby Town	7	(6)
- * Club domestic league appearances and goals

William Alfred Crawford (8 May 1872 – 1955) was an English professional footballer who played as an inside forward.
