= 1964 in association football =

The following are the football (soccer) events of the year 1964 throughout the world.

== Events ==
- The Estadio Nacional disaster in Peru claims the lives of 328 fans.
- SC Cambuur founded
- Copa Libertadores won by Independiente after defeating Nacional on an aggregate score of 1–0.
- September 16 – Dutch club DWS from Amsterdam makes its European debut by defeating Turkey's Fenerbahçe (3–1) in the first round of the European Cup, with two goals from Frans Geurtsen.
- September 23 – Fortuna '54 from Sittard makes its European debut by losing to Italy's Torino (3–1) in the first round of the Cup Winners Cup. The only goal for the Dutch side is scored by the later coach Spitz Kohn.
- 1964 International Soccer League
  - League: Zagłębie Sosnowiec defeated SV Werder Bremen, 5–0 on aggregate.
  - Cup: Dukla Prague defeated Zagłębie Sosnowiec 4–2, on aggregate.

== Winners club national championship ==
=== Africa ===
- Egypt: Zamalek

=== Asia ===
- Qatar: Al-Maref

=== Europe ===
- England: Liverpool
- France: AS Saint-Étienne
- Italy: Bologna
- Netherlands: DWS
- Scotland: Rangers
- Spain: Real Madrid
- Turkey: Fenerbahçe
- West Germany: 1. FC Köln

=== North America ===
- Mexico: Chivas Guadalajara

=== South America ===
- Argentina: Boca Juniors
- Brazil: Santos
- Chile: Universidad de Chile
- Paraguay: Club Guaraní

== International tournaments ==
- 1964 British Home Championship (October 12, 1963 – April 11, 1964)

Shared by England, Scotland and Northern Ireland

- 1964 Taça de Nações (May 30 – June 7, 1964)

Argentina

- 1964 AFC Asian Cup in Israel (May 26 – June 3, 1964)
  1. Israel
  2. India
  3. South Korea
- UEFA European Football Championship in Spain (June 17–21, 1964)
  1. Spain
  2. Soviet Union
  3. Hungary
- Olympic Games in Tokyo, Japan (October 11–23, 1964)
  1. Hungary
  2. Czechoslovakia
  3. East Germany

== Births ==
- January 8 – José Luis Carranza (Peruvian footballer)
- January 14 – Eugen Vodă (Romanian former footballer)
- January 24 – Abraham Nava (Mexican footballer)
- January 27 – Ceno Aleksandrovski, retired Macedonian footballer
- March 5 – Gerald Vanenburg (Dutch international footballer)
- March 17 – Stefano Borgonovo (Italian footballer) (d. 2013)
- April 17 – Wisdom Mumba Chansa, Zambian footballer (d. 1993)
- April 22 – Paul Baxter, English former professional footballer
- May 12 – José Casanova Mendoza, Peruvian footballer (d. 1987)
- June 13 – Antoni Jeleń, Polish retired footballer
- June 22 – Nico Jalink (Dutch footballer)
- June 27 – Igor Kulish (Russian footballer)
- June 30 – Ryszard Kraus (Polish international footballer) (d. 2013)
- July 9 – Gianluca Vialli, Italian football player and manager (d. 2023)
- July 30 – Jürgen Klinsmann (German international footballer and manager)
- August 5 – Raimonds Laizāns (Latvian footballer)
- August 20 – Giuseppe Giannini (Italian footballer)
- August 27 – Ahmed Ahmedou, retired Mauritanian international footballer
- September 7 – Thierry Villa, French former professional footballer
- October 19 – Whiteson Changwe, Zambian international (d. 1993)
- October 25 – Johan de Kock (Dutch footballer)
- October 26 – Anatoli Kertoake, Russian former footballer and manager
- October 31 – Marco van Basten (Dutch international footballer)
- November 11 – Miguel Sanabria (Paraguayan footballer)
- November 12 – Thomas Berthold (German international footballer)
- November 24 – Hendrie Krüzen (Dutch footballer)
- November 28
  - Ken Charlery, St Lucian international
- December 1 – Salvatore Schillaci, Italian footballer (d. 2024)
- December 9 – Blas Cristaldo, Paraguayan footballer
- December 10 – Simon Gibson, English footballer (died 2019)
- December 13 – Dieter Eilts, German international footballer and manager

== Deaths ==
=== May ===
- May 26 — Eric Sono, South African skipper. (26-27; car crash).

=== July ===
- July 21 — John White, English forward, winner of FA Cup 2 seasons in a row. (27; lightning strike).

=== October ===
- October 6 – Pietro Serantoni, Italian midfielder, winner of the 1938 FIFA World Cup. (57; Brain tumor).

=== December ===
- December 5 – Arthur Marbles, English footballer.
- December 13 – Pedro Petrone, Uruguayan striker, winner of the 1930 FIFA World Cup and topscorer of the 1931–32 Serie A and 1924 Summer Olympics. (59)
