= 1886–87 in Scottish football =

Football in Scotland
- Season: 1886–87

1886–87 in Scottish football

Scottish Cup winners
- Hibernian

Junior Cup winners
- Fairfield Govan

Scotland national team
- 1887 BHC

The 1886–87 season was the 14th season of competitive football in Scotland. This season saw the inaugural playing of the Scottish Junior Cup.

== Honours ==
=== Cup honours ===
==== National ====
Competition	Winner	Score	Runner-up
Scottish Cup	Hibernian	2 – 1	Dumbarton
Scottish Junior Cup	Fairfield Govan	3 – 1 (Note: Replay needed.)	Edinburgh Woodburn

=== County ===
Competition	Winner	Score	Runner-up
Ayrshire Cup	Hurlford	4 – 1	Kilbirnie
Buteshire Cup	Cumbrae	2 – 0	Bute Rangers
Dumbartonshire Cup	Renton	5 – 0	Vale of Leven
East of Scotland Shield	Hibernian	3 – 0	Hearts
Fife Cup	Dunfermline Athletic	3 – 1	Burntisland Thistle
Forfarshire Cup	Dundee Harp	4 – 2	Strathmore
Lanarkshire Cup	Airdrieonians	5 – 0	Drumpellier
Linlithgowshire Cup	Armadale	2 – 0	Durhamtown Rangers
Perthshire Cup	Coupar Angus	2 – 1	Fair City Athletic
Renfrewshire Cup	Abercorn	5 – 1	Arthurlie
Stirlingshire Cup	East Stirlingshire	1 – 0	Falkirk

== Teams in F.A. Cup ==
Season	Club	Round	Opponent	Result
1886–87	Cowlairs	1st round	(England) Darwen Old Wanderers	4 – 1
1886–87	Cowlairs	2nd	(England) Rossendale	10 – 2
1886–87	Cowlairs	3rd round	Rangers	2 – 3
1886–87	Heart of Midlothian	1st round	(England) Darwen	1 – 7
1886–87	Partick Thistle	1st round		
1886–87	Partick Thistle	2nd round		
1886–87	Partick Thistle	3rd round		
1886–87	Partick Thistle	4th round		
1886–87	Partick Thistle	5th round		
1886–87	Queen's Park	1st round	(England) Preston North End	0 – 3
1886–87	Rangers	1st round		
1886–87	Rangers	2nd round		
1886–87	Rangers	3rd round		
1886–87	Rangers	4th round		
1886–87	Rangers	5th round		
1886–87	Rangers	Semi-finals		
1886–87	Renton	1st round	(England) Accrington	1 – 0
1886–87	Renton	2nd round	(England) Blackburn Rovers	2 – 2
1886–87	Renton	2nd round Replay	(England) Blackburn Rovers	2 – 0
1886–87	Renton	3rd round	(England) Preston North End	0 – 2
1886–87	Third Lanark	1st round	(England) Higher Walton	5 – 0
1886–87	Third Lanark	2nd round	(England) Bolton Wanderers	2 – 3

== Scotland national team ==
Date	Venue	Opponents	Score (Note: Scotland's score is shown first.)	Competition	Scotland scorers
19 February 1887	Hampden Park, Glasgow	Ireland	4 – 1	British Home Championship	Willie Watt, Tom Jenkinson, William Johnstone, James Low
19 March 1887	Leamington Road, Blackburn	England	3 – 2	British Home Championship	James McCall, Leitch Keir, James Allan
21 March 1887	Racecourse Ground, Wrexham	Wales	2 – 0	British Home Championship	William Robertson, James Allan

Pos	Team	Pld	W	D	L	GF	GA	GD	Pts
1	Scotland (C)	3	3	0	0	9	3	+6	6
2	England	3	2	0	1	13	3	+10	4
3	Ireland	3	1	0	2	5	12	−7	2
4	Wales	3	0	0	3	1	10	−9	0

Rules for classification: 1) Points. The points system worked as follows: 2 points for a win and 1 point for a draw.
(C) Champions
