= 1886–87 British Home Championship =

Tournament details
- Host country: England, Ireland, Scotland and Wales
- Dates: 5 February – 21 March 1887
- Teams: 4

Final positions
- Champions: Scotland (4th title)
- Runners-up: England

Tournament statistics
- Matches played: 6
- Goals scored: 28 (4.67 per match)
- Top scorer: (England) Tinsley Lindley (6 goals)

The 1886–87 British Home Championship was the fourth international football tournament between the British Home Nations. Played during the second half of the 1886–87 football season, the competition was won by Scotland for the fourth consecutive time (although they had once shared victory with England). Ireland also achieved their first placing above the bottom of the table, finishing above Wales due to victory at home in their final match.

England and Ireland began the competition in early February, England comprehensively defeating their visitors 7–0 in Sheffield and taking the initial tournament lead. Scotland joined them with a strong victory over Ireland in their first game, but England again seized the top slot with their own defeat of Wales. In their final match, Ireland succeeded in achieving their first ever international victory with a 4–1 win over Wales in Belfast, to put them in third position. England and Scotland then played a deciding match in Blackburn, Scotland only just running out 3–2 winners after a very tough game. In the final match, Scotland beat Wales in Wrexham to outstrip England's points total and win the trophy.

== Table ==
Pos	Team	Pld	W	D	L	GF	GA	GD	Pts
1	Scotland (C)	3	3	0	0	9	3	+6	6
2	England	3	2	0	1	13	3	+10	4
3	Ireland	3	1	0	2	5	12	−7	2
4	Wales	3	0	0	3	1	10	−9	0

Rules for classification: 1) Points. The points system worked as follows: 2 points for a win and 1 point for a draw.
(C) Champions

== Results ==
5 February 1887

England	7–0	Ireland
Lindley; Dewhurst; Cobbold

Bramall Lane, Sheffield
Attendance: 6,000
Referee: Alexander Hunter (Wales)

19 February 1887

Scotland	4–1	Ireland
Watt 5'; Jenkinson 43'; Johnstone 55'; Lowe 75'		Browne 41'

Hampden Park, Glasgow
Attendance: 1,000
Referee: Alexander Hunter (Wales)

26 February 1887

England	4–0	Wales
Lindley; Cobbold; Own goal

Kennington Oval, London
Attendance: 4,500
Referee: Thomas Devlin (Scotland)

12 March 1887

Ireland	4–1	Wales
Stanfield; Browne; Peden; Sherrard		Henry Sabine

Cliftonville Cricket Ground, Belfast
Attendance: 4,000
Referee: James McKillop (Scotland)

19 March 1887

England	2–3	Scotland
Lindley 32'; Dewhurst 69'		McCall 30'; Keir 68'; Allan 70'

Leamington Road, Blackburn
Attendance: 12,000
Referee: John Sinclair (Ireland)

21 March 1887

Wales	0–2	Scotland
		Robertson 40'; Allan 80'

Racecourse Ground, Wrexham
Attendance: 2,000
Referee: Albert Bertram Hall (England)

== Winning squad ==
- Scotland

Name	Apps/Goals by opponent			Total	
Name	(Wales) WAL	(Ireland) IRE	(England) ENG	Apps	Goals
James Allan	1/1		1/1	2	2
Leitch Keir	1		1/1	2	1
James McCall	1		1/1	2	1
William Robertson	1/1		1	2	1
Walter Arnott	1		1	2	0
John Auld	1		1	2	0
John Forbes	1		1	2	0
Bob Kelso	1		1	2	0
John Marshall	1		1	2	0
James McAulay	1		1	2	0
William Sellar	1		1	2	0
Tom Jenkinson		1/1		1	1
William Johnston		1/1		1	1
James Lowe		1/1		1	1
Willie Watt		1/1		1	1
Ned Doig		1		1	0
James Hutton		1		1	0
John Lambie		1		1	0
Thomas McMillan		1		1	0
Bob Smellie		1		1	0
John Weir		1		1	0
Andrew Whitelaw		1		1	0
