= Timeline of association football =

This page indexes the individual year in association football pages. Each year is annotated with one or more significant events as a reference point.

== Pre-1860s ==
- 1820s in football

Order imposed on folk football. Public schools started devising versions of football. The Foot Ball Club of Edinburgh was founded as the first club to play any type of organized football.

- 1830s in football
- 1840s in football

The Cambridge Rules were created in 1848. Official referees appeared for the first time in a football match at a match held in Cheltenham in 1849.

- 1850s in football

Sheffield F.C., the oldest surviving independent football club in the world, was founded in 1857. In 1858 it created its first set of rules, which became known as the Sheffield Rules.

== 1860s ==
- 1862 in football

Notts County F.C., the first professional football club, was founded.

- 1863 in football

The Football Association and Stoke City F.C. were founded.

- 1864 in football

Wrexham A.F.C, the first football club in Wales, were founded.

- 1865 in football

Nottingham Forest F.C. were founded by group of Shinty players.

- 1867 in football

Sheffield Wednesday F.C. were founded.

== 1870s ==
- 1870 in football

First "goalkeepers", and the continued transition from "dribbling game" to "passing game" is seen in club matches in Sheffield and London. The first international match arranged by the Football Association between England and Scotland on 5 March 1870 finishes in a 0–0 draw at the Kennington Oval in London. Combination Game developed by Royal Engineers AFC.

- 1871 in football

Charles William Alcock created the Football Association Challenge Cup, the oldest cup tournament still extant.

- 1872 in football

Scotland and England draw 0–0 in the first FIFA-recognized international football match, played at the West of Scotland Cricket Club. Wanderers beat Royal Engineers in the first FA Cup final. The corner kick and ball fixture is introduced by The London Football Association. Football introduced in France by English sailors. Rangers F.C. is founded in Scotland.

- 1873 in football

The Scottish Football Association is founded. The offside law is changed so that an offside position is determined when the ball is played by a teammate, rather than when it is received. The corner kick is defined.

- 1874 in football

The FA authorizes referees to send players off for certain offences and makes a rule requiring teams to change ends at halftime. The first shin pads are introduced. Aston Villa F.C. and Bolton Wanderers F.C were founded.

- 1875 in football

The hard crossbar is introduced into London FA rules, replacing tape as the means of marking the top of the goal. Oxford University tour Germany and a number of German universities take up the game (one of first countries to play under FA rules outside of Britain). Blackburn Rovers F.C. was founded. Birmingham City F.C. were also founded as Small Heath Alliance F.C.

- 1876 in football

Carlton Cricket Club (Canada) form football section and subsequently tours Britain. Middlesbrough F.C. were founded.

- 1877 in football

Sheffield & London association rules amalgamate to form one unified modern football code. The length of a match was set at 90 minutes. Wolverhampton Wanderers were founded.

- 1878 in football

Referees began to use whistles. West Bromwich Albion, Manchester United (as Newton Heath L&YR F.C.), Everton (as St. Domingo's FC) and Ipswich Town were founded. The first football match to be staged under electric floodlighting took place at Bramall Lane, Sheffield, between two local representative teams.

- 1879 in football

Kjøbenhavns Boldklub introduces itself as the first sports club in continental Europe. Sunderland A.F.C., Doncaster Rovers F.C. and Fulham F.C were founded.

== 1880s ==
- 1880 in football

Irish Football Association founded. Clubs charge for admission. Players paid lost wages and expenses (players still part-time). Manchester City are founded as St. Marks. Royal Antwerp F.C. is founded in Antwerp, Belgium by English workers. Preston North End F.C. were founded in this year by members of cricket club with the same name.

- 1881 in football

Watford F.C, Leyton Orient F.C. and FC Girondins de Bordeaux, the first football club in France, were founded. First Manchester derby between Manchester United (then known as Newton Heath) and Manchester City (then known as St. Mark's West Gorton) occur this year, the match outcome was ended 3–0 victory for United (Newton Heath).

- 1882 in football

Queens Park Rangers FC, Tottenham Hotspur F.C., and Burnley F.C. are founded. The first club in Uruguay formed by an English professor at Montevideo University; another club later formed by British railway engineers. Two-handed throw-in introduced.

- 1883 in football

Coventry City F.C. was founded.

- 1884 in football

Played for the first time the British Home Championship, the oldest tournament for national teams: the Scotland national team emerges as winner. Derby County are founded along with Leicester City, who are founded as Leicester Fosse.

- 1885 in football

The Football Association legalises professionalism. The first non-European international was contested on 28 November 1885, at Newark, New Jersey, between the United States and Canada, the Canadians winning 1–0. Arbroath beat Bon Accord 36–0 in the Scottish Cup, a record which stands to this day. Southampton F.C. and Millwall F.C. were founded as St. Mary's Young Men Association F.C. and Millwall Rovers respectively.

- 1886 in football

The FAs of England, Scotland, Wales and Ireland form the International Football Association Board. The referee and the captain player for each team are introduced. Arsenal F.C. were founded as Dial Square before change the name to Arsenal in 1913.

- 1887 in football

The first football team in South America is founded, Gimnasia y Esgrima de La Plata, Argentina. British introduce football to Russia. Hamburger SV is founded. Hibernian F.C. wins the Football World Championship against Preston North End, 2–1 in Edinburgh. Wycombe Wanderers F.C. and Blackpool F.C. were founded.

- 1888 in football

The Football League, the world's first national football league competition, is founded in England by Aston Villa director William McGregor. Celtic F.C. is founded. Renton F.C. wins the Football World Championship against West Bromwich Albion, 4–1 in Glasgow.

- 1889 in football

The Royal Dutch Football Association and the Danish Football Association are founded. The Danish association is the first non-British European football association. The Football Alliance is formed as a rival to The Football League. The first football association not admitted to FIFA is formed: the Cornwall County Football Association. Rosario Central, and Mohun Bagan, the oldest football club in India, is founded. RC Recreativo de Huelva, the first club in Spain, is founded. Sheffield United F.C. were founded.

== 1890s ==
- 1890 in football

The IFA Premiership (Irish League) is formed (NIFL Premiership). The Scottish Football League is formed. Goal nets used for the first time.

- 1891 in football

The penalty kick is introduced. Liverpool engineer John Alexander Brodie invents the football net. Assistant referees are first introduced as linesmen. The first Oceanian football association is formed: the New Zealand Soccer Association. The first ever championship outside of Britain takes place in Argentina: AAF Championship. C.A. Peñarol is founded.

- 1892 in football

The Football League introduces a second division. Liverpool F.C. and Newcastle United F.C. are founded. The first Asian football association is formed: the Football Association of Singapore. Argentina is the first country outside of Britain to have a national championship.

- 1893 in football

Argentine Football Association is founded, the first South American football association. Genoa Cricket and Football Club, the first Italian club football team, and F.C. Porto are founded.

- 1894 in football

Referee in complete control of game. Floriana FC of Malta is founded. The first Merseyside derby match occurred in this year, the game ended 3-0 win for Everton.

- 1895 in football

The Federación de Fútbol de Chile, the Belgian Football Association and the Gibraltar Football Association are founded. Clube de Regatas do Flamengo is founded. Sunderland A.F.C. wins the Football World Championship against Heart of Midlothian F.C., 5–3 in Edinburgh. West Ham United F.C. were founded as Thames Ironworks F.C. before changing the names due to reformation of the club in 1900.

- 1896 in football

Italy's first national championship is organised by the Italian Federation of Gymnastics. Football played at the first Summer Olympics in Athens as demonstration sport. The match length is set to 90 minutes.

- 1897 in football

The Football League introduces automatic promotion and relegation between its two divisions. Juventus FC is founded as Sport Club Juventus.

- 1898 in football

The Italian Football Federation is formed. CR Vasco da Gama, Standard Liège are founded. CS Constantine of Algeria is founded. Portsmouth F.C. were founded in this year by dock workers.

- 1899 in football

FC Barcelona, Club Nacional de Football, Ferencvárosi TC and A.C. Milan are founded. The number of a football team is defined to be 11 players. AFC Bournemouth were founded in this year as Boscombe F.C.

== 1900s ==
- 1900 in football

Asociación Uruguaya de Fútbol and German Football Association were founded. FC Bayern Munich, AFC Ajax, RCD Espanyol, Borussia Mönchengladbach and S.S. Lazio (as Società Podistica Lazio) are founded. The first clubs dedicated to football still active in Brazil, Sport Club Rio Grande and Associação Atlética Ponte Preta are founded. The Malta Football Association is founded.

- 1901 in football

Czechoslovak Football Association and Hungarian Football Federation are founded. The match between Tottenham Hotspur F.C. and Heart of Midlothian F.C. for the Football World Championship finishes 0–0, in London. Hibernian win Scottish Cup on 23 April. Club Atlético River Plate is founded in Argentina, C.F. Pachuca is founded, Alianza Lima is founded in Peru. Brighton and Hove Albion F.C. were founded.

- 1902 in football

The first international match between South American national teams is played between Uruguay 0–6 Argentina, and the first international match between non-British European national teams: Austria 5–0 Hungary. 26 people die and over 500 are injured when a section of the terracing collapses after a Scotland-England British Home Championship match at Ibrox Park. Five Spanish clubs compete for the 1902 Copa de la Coronación, which was unofficially the first Copa del Rey. The first Brazilian football league, Campeonato Paulista, is won by São Paulo Athletic Club. The first North American football association (geographically South American but affiliated to CONCACAF) is formed: the Guyana Football Federation. The penalty area is defined. Real Madrid, Olimpia Asunción and Fluminense Football Club are founded. Heart of Midlothian F.C. won the Football World Championship against Tottenham Hotspur F.C., 3–1 in Edinburgh. Norwich City F.C. was founded.

- 1903 in football

Beşiktaş J.K., Grêmio Foot-Ball Porto Alegrense, Racing Club de Avellaneda and Atlético Madrid are founded.

- 1904 in football

FIFA is founded in Paris on 21 May. The first football association geographically in North America is formed: the Fédération Haïtienne de Football. Swedish Football Association is founded. S.L. Benfica, Botafogo de Futebol e Regatas and Argentinos Juniors are founded. Professional Footballers' Association (PFA) formed.

- 1905 in football

The Muratti Vase, the oldest tournament for FAs not admitted to FIFA, played for the first time, won by Guernsey. Galatasaray, Chelsea F.C., Club Atlético Boca Juniors, Estudiantes de La Plata, Club Atlético Independiente and Sport Club do Recife are founded.

- 1906 in football

England joins FIFA. Club Deportivo Guadalajara and Sporting Clube de Portugal is founded.

- 1907 in football

Fenerbahçe S.K., Al-Ahly and Bradford Park Avenue A.F.C. are founded.

- 1908 in football

For the first time, officially, a football tournament is played at the Summer Olympics in London, which was won by Great Britain. FC Internazionale, San Lorenzo de Almagro, Clube Atlético Mineiro, Feyenoord, Panathinaikos F.C. and Huddersfield Town A.F.C. were founded. Organized in Italy the Torneo Internazionale Stampa Sportiva, the first international football tournament for clubs, but not officially.

- 1909 in football

R.S.C. Anderlecht, Sport Club Internacional and Borussia Dortmund are founded. The first official national football tournament was organized in 1909 by the recently founded Romanian Football Federation, then called the Association of Athletic Societies in Romania. Played for the first time in Italy the Sir Thomas Lipton Trophy, considered the first official international football tournament for clubs.

== 1910s ==
- 1910 in football

Club Atlético Vélez Sársfield, Sport Club Corinthians Paulista, MKE Ankaragücü and FC St. Pauli are founded. The Copa Centenario Revolución de Mayo 1910, played in and won by Argentina, is the first South American competition with more than two national teams, and is considered unofficially the first Copa América.

- 1911 in football

FK Austria Vienna, El Zamalek and Anorthosis Famagusta are founded.

- 1912 in football

Goalkeepers banned from handling the ball outside their own penalty area. Santos FC and Karşıyaka S.K. are founded.

- 1913 in football

Opposing players forced to stand at least ten yards away from a free kick. Royal Spanish Football Federation and United States Soccer Federation are founded.

- 1914 in football

The oldest surviving club trophy soccer competition in the Americas, Lamar Hunt U.S. Open Cup, is founded in the United States as National Challenge Cup and the Brooklyn Field Club (1898–1924) are crowned champions. Glentoran from Belfast wins first ever European competition, the Vienna Cup. Brazilian Football Confederation is founded. Sociedade Esportiva Palmeiras, Levski Sofia and Altay S.K. are founded.

- 1916 in football

CONMEBOL is founded. Uruguay wins the first Copa América, held in Argentina. Club América is founded. Football Association of Thailand, was founded.

- 1918 in football

LDU Quito are founded under the name Club Universitario.

- 1919 in football

Congolese Association Football Federation, the first African football association, French Football Federation and Polish Football Association are founded. Leeds United, Liga Deportiva Alajuelense, Valencia CF, Dacia Unirea Braila, U.S. Salernitana, Espérance Sportive de Tunis are founded.

== 1920s ==
- 1920 in football

For the first time an African national team plays an international match, which is also the first intercontinental national team match between Italy and Egypt, which ends 2–1, at the Summer Olympics in Belgium.

- 1921 in football

Egyptian Football Association is founded. Cruzeiro Esporte Clube is founded. The IFA Premiership (Irish League) is now the national league of Northern Ireland, following partition.

- 1923 in football

Bolton Wanderers defeat West Ham United in the first English FA Cup final played at Wembley Stadium, remembered as the White Horse Final. Rapid București, Gençlerbirliği S.K. and Turkish Football Federation are founded.

- 1924 in football

Players allowed to score directly from a corner kick. For the first time a South American national team and a European national team play each other: Uruguay-Yugoslavia 7–0, at the Summer Olympics in France. Uruguay wins the gold medal. For the first time an Oceanian national team plays an international match: Australia-Canada 3–2. Chinese Football Association is founded. Following their Italian league victory in 1923–24, Genoa C.F.C. becomes the first team ever to add a scudetto patch to their shirt.

- 1925 in football

The offside rule is changed: a player is now onside if a minimum of two (instead of three) opposing players are between him and the goal line. Étoile Sportive du Sahel, Colo-Colo and Olympiacos F.C. are founded.

- 1926 in football

Huddersfield Town become the first team to win the Football League in three consecutive seasons. ACF Fiorentina PAOK and APOEL FC are founded.

- 1927 in football

AC Sparta Prague wins the inaugural Mitropa Cup, the first international major European cup for clubs, the predecessor to the Champions League. Federación Mexicana de Fútbol Asociación is founded. FC Dynamo Kyiv and Cruz Azul are founded. First League match broadcast on radio.

- 1928 in football

La Liga is formed. Uruguay wins the gold medal for the second time in a row.

- 1929 in football

Lega Calcio Serie A is formed. Goalkeepers have to stand still on their lines for penalty kicks.

== 1930s ==
- 1930 in football

Thirteen teams enter the first World Cup, held in Uruguay. The hosts beat Argentina 4–2 in the final. Contested between the top national teams of continental Europe, Dr. Gerö Cup' first edition is won by Italy. São Paulo is founded.

- 1932 in football

Football is excluded from the 1932 Summer Olympics in Los Angeles due to the low popularity of the sport in the United States at the time. Bologna becomes the first Italian club to win a major international competition following their Mitropa Cup conquest.

- 1934 in football

Hosts Italy become the second World Cup winners and the first European team to do so, beating Czechoslovakia 2–1 in the final. For the first time a qualification stage occurs and an Asian national team plays an international match: Egypt-Palestine 7–1. Egypt becomes the first African team to compete. The first Chula–Thammasat Traditional Football Match between Chulalongkorn University and Thammasat University, were kicked off for the first time

- 1935 in football

Deportivo Saprissa is founded.
Juventus becomes the first team in Italian football history to win 5 national titles in a row.

- 1936 in football

Italy wins gold at the Olympics in Berlin and joins Uruguay to become Olympic and World champion.

- 1937 in football

The largest football crowd was recorded, 149,415 people turned up at Hampden Park, Glasgow, to see Scotland play England

- 1938 in football

In the 1938 World Cup held in France, Italy beats Hungary 4–2 in the final and becomes the first team to successfully defend the title and the first to win on foreign soil. Vittorio Pozzo becomes the first coach and only at present to guide his team to two World Cup victories. Polish Ernest Willimowski becomes the first player to score four goals in a World Cup game during Poland's 6–5 loss against Brazil. Following the Anschluss with Germany, Austria withdraws and some Austrian players joins the German squad. Argentina and Uruguay boycott the tournament as it is held in Europe for the second successive time. First live TV transmission of FA Cup Final.

- 1939 in football

Shirt numbering is made compulsory.

== 1940s ==
- 1941 in football

CCCF Championship Is organized for the first time by CCCF, won and hosted by Costa Rica.

- 1945 in football

Red Star Belgrade is founded.

- 1946 in football

The Burnden Park Disaster kills 33 Bolton Wanderers fans. The PFC is formed. JS Kabylie is founded.

- 1947 in football

NAFC Championship is organized for the first time by North American Football Confederation in Cuba, and won by Mexico. Atlético Nacional and FC Steaua București are founded.

- 1948 in football

CSKA Sofia and Dinamo București are founded.

- 1949 in football

FC Barcelona win the inaugural Latin Cup, one of the forerunners of the European Cup. The Superga air disaster kills 31 people, including 18 Grande Torino players, the backbone of the Italy national football team. Raja Casablanca is founded.

== 1950s ==
- 1950 in football

Uruguay win the 1950 FIFA World Cup held in Brazil, when they beat the hosts 2–1 in the final group match of the tournament, also known as the Maracanazo, the highest attendance at any sporting match at 200,000. Earlier in the same tournament, one of the biggest upsets in football history occurs, when the United States shock England 1–0.

- 1951 in football

Use of white ball permitted. Copa Rio, the first world tournament for clubs, is played for the first time in Brazil, and won by Sociedade Esportiva Palmeiras.

- 1952 in football

Hungary's revolutionary tactics help the Golden Team to win the football at the 1952 Summer Olympics. The Panamerican Championship is played for the first time in Chile, won by Brazil.

- 1953 in football

England lose a home match for the first time, 6–3 to Hungary.

- 1954 in football

UEFA is founded in Basel, Switzerland, Asian Football Confederation is formed. West Germany win the 1954 FIFA World Cup held in Switzerland (it was the first World Cup with a sponsor), coming back from 0–2 to win the final game 3–2 against Hungary, a match known as The Miracle of Bern. Pumas UNAM is founded.

- 1955 in football

First European Cup starts. The Inter-Cities Fairs Cup, considered the precursor of the UEFA Cup, is played for the first time and won by Barcelona.

- 1956 in football

Real Madrid beat Stade de Reims-Champagne 4–3 in the first European Cup final. First RAI TV's transmission of football match Serie A happens in Italy in a match between Fiorentina and Napoli. The first Asian Cup is played in Hong Kong, won by Korea Republic. Saudi Arabia Football Federation is founded. Floodlighting used for first time at League match (Portsmouth). The Ballon d'Or is assigned for the first time to Stanley Matthews.

- 1957 in football

CAF is founded; only three teams enter the first African Cup of Nations in Sudan, won by Egypt. Al-Hilal is founded.

- 1958 in football

Pelé and Garrincha star as Brazil win their first World Cup in Sweden, beating the hosts 5–2 in the final. 23 people, including eight Manchester United players, are killed in the Munich air disaster. Just Fontaine becomes the first and to this day only player to score 13 goals in a single World Cup. Juventus becomes the first team in history to adopt a golden star above their crest to represent their tenth Serie A title, a national record then.

- 1959 in football

The first season of the Brazilian National Championship takes place and is won by Esporte Clube Bahia. Once Caldas is founded.

== 1960s ==
- 1960 in football

The first European Championship is played in France, won by USSR. The Copa Libertadores is played for the first time and won by C.A. Peñarol, and the Intercontinental Cup is played for the first time, won by Real Madrid. First European Cup Winners' Cup.

- 1961 in football

CONCACAF is founded with the fusion of CCCF and NAFC. Benfica become the second team to win the European Cup, beating FC Barcelona 3–2 in the final. ACF Fiorentina wins the first edition of UEFA Cup Winners' Cup, and becomes the first Italian team to win an UEFA competition. Football Federation Australia is founded.

- 1962 in football

Brazil retain the 1962 World Cup, beating Czechoslovakia 3–1 in the final. The CONCACAF Champions League is organized for the first time, and won by Club Deportivo Guadalajara. FIFA reaches 100 members.

- 1963 in football

The West German national league Bundesliga is formed. Lev Yashin becomes the first goalkeeper to win European Footballer of the Year. The first CONCACAF Championship is played in El Salvador, won by Costa Rica. Tottenham Hotspur become the first British club to win a European football competition, European Cup Winner's Cup beating Atlético Madrid 5–1 in the final.

- 1964 in football

Internazionale wins the European Cup for the first time joining city rivals AC Milan as European champions. Milano becomes the first city and only at present to have won the Champions League with two different clubs. CAF Champions League organized for the first time and won by Oryx Douala.

- 1965 in football

FC Twente is founded.

- 1966 in football

England win the 1966 World Cup as hosts, beating West Germany 4–2 in the final as Geoff Hurst becomes the first player to score a hat-trick in the final. The OFC is founded.

- 1967 in football

Celtic become the first British club to win the European Cup, beating Internazionale 2–1 in the final. Flórián Albert became the first Hungarian player who win the European Golden Boot. The AFC Champions League is played for the first time, won by Hapoel Tel Aviv F.C.

- 1968 in football

Manchester United win the European Cup ten years after the Munich air disaster killed eight of their players. Eusébio wins the inaugural Golden Boot award as the continent's top club scorer.

- 1969 in football

2000 people die when El Salvador and Honduras declare war on each other following a World Cup qualifying match.

== 1970s ==
- 1970 in football

Brazil becomes the first national side to win a third World Cup in Mexico, the first ever held outside Europe and South America, beating Italy 4–1 in the final as their captain Pelé becomes the first player to win three World Cup medals. Earlier in the tournament, The Game of the Century occurs, Italy beats Germany 4–3 in the semifinal after five goals scored in extra time. Yellow and red cards for sendings off and admonitions appear. Paris was founded.

- 1971 in football

66 die in the second Ibrox disaster. First UEFA Cup. The Inter-Cities Fairs Cup is abolished. The first FIFA-recognised women's international match is played: France 4 Netherlands 0.

- 1972 in football

Rangers F.C. wins the European Cup Winners' Cup. Tottenham Hotspur wins the first UEFA Cup. AFC Ajax wins the first edition of the UEFA Super Cup.

- 1973 in football

Ajax win the European Cup for the third consecutive season. The first OFC Nations Cup is organized and won by New Zealand.

- 1974 in football

Hosts West Germany win the 1974 World Cup, beating the Netherlands 2–1 in the final.

- 1975 in football

The AFC Women's Asian Cup is organized for the first time in Hong Kong, won by New Zealand.

- 1976 in football

Bayern Munich win the European Cup for the third consecutive season. Iran national team win its third consecutive Asian Cup, a record.

- 1977 in football

Juventus become the first Italian and South European club to win the UEFA Cup. The first FIFA U-20 World Cup is organized in Tunisia, and won by USSR.

- 1978 in football

Hosts Argentina win the 1978 World Cup, beating the Netherlands 3–1 in the final; Johann Cruyff refuses to play in the tournament.

- 1979 in football

Nottingham Forest lift their first European Cup in Munich, defeating Malmö 1–0 in the final.

== 1980s ==
- 1980 in football

West Germany defeats Belgium 2–1 in the final at the Stadio Olimpico in Rome to take the European Football Championship.

- 1981 in football

The Football League begins awarding three points for a win instead of two. In Uruguay, to celebrate the 50 years of the World Cup, the 1980 Mundialito is organize; won by the hosts.

- 1982 in football

The 1982 FIFA World Cup is played in Spain, the first with 24 teams, the tournament was won by Italy, after defeating West Germany 3–1 in the final in the Spanish capital of Madrid. It was Italy's third World Cup win and first since 1938. The holders Argentina were eliminated in the second group round. Algeria, Cameroon, Honduras, Kuwait and New Zealand made their first appearances in the finals. for the first time all continents were represented in the competition. Aston Villa win the European Cup, beating Bayern Munich 1–0 in the final.

- 1983 in football

Aberdeen beat Real Madrid to win their first European Trophy, the European Cup Winners' Cup soon followed by defeating Hamburg to win the European Super Cup. The OFC Women's Championship is played for the first time in New Caledonia, won by New Zealand.

- 1984 in football

Michel Platini leads Juventus to the UEFA Cup Winners' Cup, beating F.C. Porto in the final and the hosts France to the European Football Championship, beating Spain in the final. France also wins the gold medal in the 1984 Olympic Games, beating Brazil in the final at the Rose Bowl. The UEFA Women's Championship is organized for the first time, won by Sweden.

- 1985 in football

On 29 May, the Heysel Stadium disaster takes place in Brussels prior the European Cup final between Liverpool and Juventus, leading to English clubs being banned from European club competition for five years. Juventus becomes the first club in the history of European football to have won all three major confederation competitions after defeating Liverpool 1–0 in that match, as well as the first in association football history to have won all possible international competitions after defeating Argentinos Juniors 6–4 (2–2 a.e.t.) in the Intercontinental Cup final at Tokyo's National Stadium on 8 December. The Bradford City stadium fire occurs at Valley Parade, taking the lives of 56 people and injuring another 200 during Bradford City's fixture with Lincoln City. For the first time, an African squad wins a FIFA tournament, the World Championship Under 16, as Nigeria surprisingly defeat favourites West Germany 2–0 in China. The Artemio Franchi Trophy is organized for the first time, won and hosted by France. Michel Platini wins for the third consecutive time the Ballon d'Or, a record then.

- 1986 in football

The 1986 World Cup finals are played for the second time in Mexico, with Argentina defeating West Germany 3–2 for their second title at the Azteca Stadium in Mexico City; the tournament sees the dominance of Argentinian player Diego Maradona, scoring the infamous Hand of God goal, before his "Goal of the Century" solo dribble second goal, both in the quarterfinal against England. Alex Ferguson, the most decorated manager in English Football history, is appointed to be manager of Manchester United.

- 1987 in football

F.C. Porto wins the European Cup for the first time after defeating Bayern Munich 2–1 in the final. In the second World Championship FIFA Under 16, the Soviet Union defeats Nigeria on penalties. The OFC Champions League is played for the first time and won by Adelaide City.

- 1988 in football

The Netherlands, led by captain Ruud Gullit and top goal scorer Marco van Basten, defeat the Soviet Union 2–0 to win the Euro 1988 championship. Competing in Serie B, Atalanta reaches the Cup Winners' Cup semifinal, the best ever performance by a non-first division club in a major UEFA competition to this day. Start of the FIFA Fair Play campaign.

- 1989 in football

The Hillsborough disaster occurs in Sheffield, England, before the FA Cup semi-final between Liverpool and Nottingham Forest, resulting in the loss of 96 lives. A football tournament is played for the first time at the Island Games, by FAs not admitted to FIFA, hosted and won by Faroe Islands. Saudi Arabia win the FIFA U-17 World Cup, the first time an Asian team wins a FIFA World Cup.

== 1990s ==
- 1990 in football

For the first time three clubs from the same country, Italy's Juventus, Sampdoria and A.C. Milan wins all four UEFA club competitions in the same season, a feat no more possible since the Cup Winner's Cup no longer exists. West Germany wins the 1990 FIFA World Cup in Rome, Italy, defeating defending champion Argentina 1–0 in the final. In their first appearance in the tournament, Republic of Ireland reaches the quarter-finals without winning a single game, the furthest a team has ever advanced without winning. "Waterloo Day" for Austrian football in Euro 92 qualifying at Landskrona, Sweden, where the Faroe Islands defeat Austria 1–0 in the former's first ever international match.

- 1991 in football

In the inaugural Women's World Cup held in China, the USA win 2–1 over Norway (for the first time a Northern American team win a World Cup). After being banned for six years, English clubs are again allowed to participate in competitions sponsored by UEFA. Diego Maradona is banned for 15 months in Italy's Serie A after testing positive for cocaine in a drug test. The CAF Women's Championship is played for the first time won by Nigeria. The CONCACAF Women's Championship is played for the first time in Haiti, won by USA. The Sudamericano Femenino, CONMEBOL's main women's tournament, is played for the first time, hosted and won by Brazil. The FIFA World Player of the Year is assigned for the first time. J.League was founded as the professional football league in Japan, replacing the Japan Soccer League, the semi-professional league.

- 1992 in football

The back-pass rule is applied, whereby a goalkeeper is no longer permitted to pick up or catch a ball played directly by a fellow team member's foot. In the final of Euro 92, Denmark surprisingly win 2–0 over Germany. Stadium Furiani disaster takes place in Bastia, Corsica. FA Premier League created as the top flight in English Football, replacing the old Football League First Division. The first FIFA Confederations Cup is organized in Saudi Arabia, and won by Argentina. Capello's Milan wins Serie A unbeaten.

- 1993 in football

Olympique de Marseille becomes the first French club to win the European Cup, newly renamed as the UEFA Champions League, defeating AC Milan 1–0 at the Olympiastadion in Munich. Marseille also win Ligue 1, but are stripped of the title due to a corruption scandal. 18 members of the Zambia national team die in a plane crash. Manchester United win the first FA Premier League title. Brian Clough retires from his coaching role in Nottingham Forest after 18 years as coach.

- 1994 in football

The 1994 World Cup held in the United States was the first to be decided on penalties, with Brazil edging out Italy in the final at the Rose Bowl to claim their fourth title. Russia's Oleg Salenko becomes the first player and only to this day to score five goals in a single World Cup game in his country's 6–1 win over Cameroon. In the same match, 42-year-old Roger Milla of Cameroon, becomes the oldest player ever to score in a World Cup match.

- 1995 in football

The second FIFA Confederations Cup is organized in Saudi Arabia, and won by Denmark. The Bosman ruling allows all footballers playing in the European Union and not under contract to freely change clubs, and also abolishes foreign player quotas with respect to EU nationals. Norway win the second FIFA Women's World Cup. Suwon Samsung Bluewings is founded.

- 1996 in football

Bayern Munich becomes the third club in the history of European football to have won all three major UEFA competitions after winning the UEFA Cup. In the Euro 96 final, Germany defeat the Czech Republic 2–1 with a golden goal from Oliver Bierhoff; Nigeria become the first African team to win the Olympic Tournament. A football women's tournament is played for the first time at the Summer Olympics in Atlanta, won by the United States.

- 1997 in football

Helenio Herrera, legendary coach of Inter in the 1960s, dies.

- 1998 in football

In the 1998 FIFA World Cup final, France win 3–0 over Brazil at Stade de France to claim their first World Cup. Palestinian Football Federation is admitted to FIFA. The first openly gay footballer, Justin Fashanu commits suicide.

- 1999 in football

The USA, the hosting nation, defeat China in a penalty shootout to win the Women's World Cup in front of the largest crowd ever to witness a women's sporting event. Organized in Italy by UEFA the first continental tournament for regions: the UEFA Regions' Cup, won by Veneto. Mexico win the Confederations Cup: for the first time a male national team form Northern America win a FIFA tournament. The UEFA Cup Winners' Cup is abolished. Manchester United became the first English club to win the treble by winning the Premier league, FA Cup and UEFA Champions League.

== 2000s ==
- 2000 in football

France wins their second European Championship title after beating Italy 2–1, with a golden goal in extra time. First FIFA Club World Cup, won by Sport Club Corinthians Paulista. FIFA Player of the Century, a one-off award created by FIFA to decide the greatest football player of the 20th century, is awarded to Pelé and Diego Maradona, shared: both men are officially considered winners of the award.

- 2001 in football

Real Madrid sign playmaker Zinedine Zidane of Juventus in a world record transfer fee of 72 million euros. Colombia wins the 40th edition of Copa América, as hosts. Australia beats American Samoa 31–0 in 2002 World Cup qualification, the world record in an international match.

- 2002 in football

Brazil sets up a record fifth title in World Cup competition, the first ever to be played in Asia (also the first outside Europe and the Americas), defeating Germany 2–0 in the 2002 FIFA World Cup final. The first FIFA U-19 Women's World Championship is held in Canada, with the USA defeating the hosts in the final 1–0 on a golden goal in extra time.

- 2003 in football

Founded the NF-Board, the first international organization for FAs not admitted to FIFA. Paolo Maldini makes history by captaining AC Milan to a champions league victory, a feat his father Cesare did with the same club exactly 40 years before. Latvia is the first football team from the Baltic states to make an appearance in a major football competition, UEFA Euro 2004.

- 2004 in football

Greece produce one of the shocks in football history and become surprise winners of the Euro 2004 football tournament, defeating hosts Portugal 1–0 in the final. Waitakere United is founded. Arsenal wins the 2003–04 FA Premier League unbeaten, the second time an English club goes undefeated for an entire season.

- 2005 in football

The Champions League final in Istanbul sees Liverpool come back from a 0–3 half-time score to defeat A.C. Milan 3–2 in a penalty shootout, following a 3–3 draw. Also, a match-fixing scandal rocks German football, though it does not directly affect the Bundesliga. The Australian A-League is launched in replacement of the NSL to improve the quality of the game in the country.

- 2006 in football

The 2006 World Cup is held in Germany and won by Italy on a penalty kick shootout over France, and Zinedine Zidane plays his last professional game in the final captaining France only to be sent off in extra time. A major match-fixing scandal erupts in Italy, with five Serie A teams implicated. Egypt record victory for the fifth time in the African Cup of Nations.

- 2007 in football

Brazil wins the 42nd edition of Copa América, held in Venezuela. Iraq produce one of international football's greatest fairytale victories as the fractured, war-torn nation were crowned champions of the 2007 AFC Asian Cup. FIFA Women's World Cup is held in China and won by Germany. On 9 November Étoile Sportive du Sahel became the first African squad to have won all official club competitions recognized by CAF, after defeating Al-Ahly 3–1 in the CAF Champions League final in Susa.

- 2008 in football

Spain win their second European Championship title after beating Germany 1–0. Italy and A.C. Milan becomes the first national and club side to wear on their jerseys the FIFA badge of World champions. CONCACAF Champions Cup is replaced by the CONCACAF Champions League, modelled after the UEFA Champions League expand his participant teams from 8 to 24. The FIFA U-17 Women's World Cup is played for the first time in New Zealand, won by Korea DPR. The Women's Viva World Cup, the first World Cup for women's national teams not affiliated to FIFA, is played for the first time, hosted and won by Sapmi.

- 2009 in football

The FIFA Confederations Cup is won by Brazil and is held in South Africa (for the first time a FIFA tournament for senior national teams is held in Africa). Spain achieves two world records: most consecutive wins (15) and most matches without a loss (35, with Brazil). Barcelona achieves a sextuple: La Liga, Copa del Rey, Supercopa de España, UEFA Champions League, UEFA Super Cup and FIFA Club World Cup. RB was founded.

== 2010s ==
- 2010 in football

The FIFA World Cup is held in South Africa, the first African nation to host the tournament. Spain win the World Cup for the first time, becoming the first nation outside of South America to win the tournament outside of Europe. The FIFA Ballon d'Or is awarded for the first time (to Lionel Messi) after France Football's Ballon d'Or and the FIFA World Player of the Year award were merged. Egypt win the Africa Cup of Nations for the third time in a row. Inter Milan win the FIFA Club World Cup for the first time, beating TP Mazembe, the first African club to reach the final.

- 2011 in football

Japan defeat the United States in the FIFA Women's World Cup final to win the tournament for the first time. Barcelona wins the FIFA Club World Cup for a then-record second time, beating Santos in the final. Manchester United won The Premier League in 2011, their 19th English league title, surpassing Liverpool's old record of 18.

- 2012 in football

Zambia defeats third-time finalists Ivory Coast after a dramatic penalty shootout in the final, giving Zambia their first continental title, becoming the fourteenth nation to win the tournament. Tahiti wins the OFC Nations Cup for the first time, becoming the first nation other than Australia or New Zealand to win the tournament. The 2012 VIVA World Cup, played in Iraqi Kurdistan, with 9 participants, holds the largest number of participating teams for a non-FIFA tournament. The hosts emerge as winners in the final match played against Northern Cyprus, who fail to win a non-FIFA tournament in which they took part for the first time. Spain wins the 2012 European Championship: for the first time the trophy was won by the same team twice in a row. Lionel Messi scores 91 goals, establishing the new world record for most goals scored in a single calendar year, surpassing Gerd Müller's record of 85 set in 1972. Corinthians wins the FIFA Club World Cup for the second time, beating Chelsea in the final.

- 2013 in football

Nigeria wins the Africa Cup of Nations for the third time, ending their 19-year wait after defeating surprise finalists Burkina Faso. Nigeria wins the FIFA U-17 World Cup for a record fourth time. Bayern Munich wins the FIFA Club World Cup for the first time, beating Raja Casablanca in the final.

- 2014 in football

Japan wins the FIFA U-17 Women's World Cup for the first time. The FIFA World Cup is held in Brazil for the second time, the first South American nation to host the tournament in 36 years. Julio Grondona, continuous president of AFA since 1979 dies in office. The FIFA U-20 Women's World Cup is held in Canada, the first nation to host the tournament twice. Germany wins both competitions above. German Miroslav Klose becomes the all time FIFA World Cup top scorer with 16 goals. Real Madrid becomes the first team in European history to win 10 European titles and wins the FIFA Club World Cup for the first time, beating San Lorenzo in the final.

- 2015 in football

The FIFA Women's World Cup is held in Canada, United States defeat Japan in the final to win the tournament for the third time. Chile win the Copa America for the first time, in home soil after defeat Argentina in the final. The FIFA Ballon d'Or is awarded (to Lionel Messi) and he won the fifth FIFA Ballon d'Or in his career. Australia win the AFC Asian Cup for the first time. Sepp Blatter (1998–2015) ends his tenure as president of FIFA due to corruption scandal and is replaced by the acting president Issa Hayatou. Barcelona win the FIFA Club World Cup for the third time, beating River Plate, in the final.

- 2016 in football

Lionel Messi (Argentina, (Spain) Barcelona wins the 2015 FIFA Ballon d'Or and Carli Lloyd (United States, Houston Dash) wins 2015 FIFA Women's World Player of the Year. Gianni Infantino is elected president of FIFA. Copa America Centenario is hosted in the United States, the first time the Copa is held outside of South America. 16 teams from CONMEBOL and CONCACAF participate, and the tournament is won by Chile on penalties after defeating Argentina in the final. Euro 2016 is held in France, the third time the nation hosts it. Portugal defeats France 1–0 in the final to claim their first major championship in their history.

- 2017 in football

In January, The Best FIFA Football Awards 2016 Cristiano Ronaldo (Portugal, Real Madrid) wins The Best FIFA Men's Player and Carli Lloyd (Houston Dash, United States) The Best FIFA Women's Player. In May, Juventus becomes the first team in Italian football history to win 6 national titles in a row and the first in win the Italian Cup thrice consecutively, beating Lazio in the final. In October, FIFA Council officially recognized all European and South American teams that won the Intercontinental Cup as club world champions with the same status to the FIFA Club World Cup winners. Manchester United become the UEFA Europa League champions and Real Madrid won the UEFA Champions League.

- 2018 in football

Liverpool's Mohamed Salah breaks record for the most goals scored in a 38-game season in the Premier League. Salah also won goal of the year and the PL golden boot. Real Madrid win their third consecutive Champions League by beating Liverpool. Atlético Madrid become Europa League Champions. Atlético Madrid beat derby rivals Real Madrid to become UEFA Super Cup champions. The 21st edition FIFA World Cup is held in Russia and is won by France for the second time. The World Cup broke the record for most penalties. UEFA launches the first edition of the UEFA Nations League. Switzerland and Lithuania hosted respectively the U-19 and U-17 feminine competitions. The masculine versions of U-19 and U-17 are hosted by Finland and England. These 4 competitions are won by Spain (feminine: both U-19 and U-17), Portugal (masculine: U-19) and the Netherlands (masculine: U-17).

- 2019 in football

The FIFA Women's World Cup is hosted by France and is won for the second time, and fourth overall, by the United States after defeating the Netherlands in the final. Algeria win the 2019 Africa Cup of Nations and Brazil win the 2019 Copa América. Liverpool F.C. win the 2019 UEFA Champions League Final, the 2019 FIFA Club World Cup and the 2019 UEFA Super Cup, beating fellow English side Chelsea F.C. who won the 2019 UEFA Europa League Final in the latter. Manchester City F.C. complete a clean sweep of the English trophies, winning the 2018–19 FA Premier League, 2019 FA Cup Final, 2019 EFL Cup Final and 2019 FA Community Shield.

== 2020s ==
- 2020 in football
  - As a result of the COVID-19 pandemic, most leagues are either suspended or abandoned. Amongst the postponed tournaments are the 2020 CONCACAF Nations League Finals, 2020 Copa América, UEFA Euro 2020 and the Football at the 2020 Summer Olympics, all of which are scheduled to be held in 2021.
  - During a match between Canada and Saint Kitts and Nevis, Christine Sinclair scores her 185th international goal, the most of any footballer in either gender.
  - Bayern Munich win the 2020 UEFA Champions League Final and the 2020 UEFA Super Cup, beating Europa League winners Sevilla in the latter.
  - Liverpool win their 19th English title, their first since 1989–90 and their first in the Premier League era.
- 2021 in football
  - Chelsea win the 2021 UEFA Champions League Final in Porto, their second Champions League Title. They follow that up by winning the 2021 UEFA Super Cup against Villarreal.
  - The UEFA Euro 2020, originally scheduled for 2020, took place in 2021 due to the COVID-19 pandemic. Italy emerged as the champions after defeating England in a thrilling final that went into a penalty shootout.
  - Argentina win the 2021 Copa America, a record-equaling title and their first since 1993.
  - Manchester City win the 2020-21 Premier League, extending their total to 5.
  - Atletico Madrid win their first title since 2014, breaking the Real Madrid and Barcelona stronghold.
  - LOSC Lille win their fourth Ligue 1 title and their first in ten years.
- 2022 in football
  - Real Madrid win a record-extending 14th Champions League title by beating Liverpool 1–0.
  - Manchester City win the 2021-22 Premier League title on the last day, pipping Liverpool to the title.
  - The 22nd edition of the FIFA World Cup is held in Qatar and won by Argentina (their third time).
- 2023 in football
  - Manchester City complete a historic treble by winning the 2022-23 FA Cup, 2022-23 Premier League, and their first Champions League title. They also win the 2023 FIFA Club World Cup in Saudi Arabia.
  - SSC Napoli win their first Serie A title in 33 years.
  - Bayern Munich seal their 11th consecutive Bundesliga title after a last-gasp 2–1 victory over Mainz.
- 2024 in football
  - In their triumphant 2023-24 Premier League season, Manchester City became the first team in English top-flight history to win four league titles in a row.
  - Real Madrid win a record-extending 15th Champions League title, beating Borussia Dortmund 2-0 at Wembley.
  - Xabi Alonso's Bayer Leverkusen break Bayern Munich's 11-year hold of the Bundesliga, winning their first ever league title and going unbeaten in the process.
  - Spain win their fourth Euro Cup in Germany, beating England 2–1 in the final at the Olympiastadion in Berlin.
  - Argentina win the 2024 Copa America, their second in a row and their sixteenth in total. They beat Colombia 1-0 after extra time in the final.
- 2025 in football
  - Paris Saint-Germain win the 2024-25 Ligue 1 title, 2024–25 Coupe de France and also their first ever Champions League title, beating Inter Milan 5-0 in Munich, marking the biggest ever margin of victory in a UEFA Champions League final.
  - Arne Slot's Liverpool win the 2024-25 Premier League title in his first season in charge of the club.
  - SSC Napoli win the 2024-25 Serie A title on the final day, topping Inter Milan by a single point.
  - Portugal beat Spain on penalties to win the 2024-25 UEFA Nations League, adding to their 2019 triumph.
  - Chelsea win the first-ever expanded FIFA Club World Cup, shocking Paris Saint-Germain in a 3-0 victory at MetLife Stadium.
- 2026 in football

== See also ==
- List of association football competitions
- List of oldest football competitions
- History of association football
