= 1860s in association football =

The following are events in the 1860s decade which are relevant to the development of association football. Included are events in closely related codes, such as the Sheffield Rules. All events happened in English football unless specified otherwise.

There was constant discussion about the rules throughout this decade and several codes were in use. The Football Association (the FA) was founded in 1863 and its rules eventually prevailed. Points at issue among the various associations included offside, the throw-in, the corner kick, the crossbar and the now-obsolete touch down. Among the clubs founded in the 1860s were Notts County, Nottingham Forest, Queen's Park FC, Sheffield Wednesday, Stoke City and Kilmarnock.

== Events ==
=== 1860 ===
- Foundation of Hallam FC, local rivals of Sheffield FC.
- 31 January – Sheffield FC revised its rules to ban all methods of handling the ball except by a fair catch. The 1858 rules had allowed players to control the ball by hand as long as they did not hold and carry it.
Panoramic view of Sandygate Road, home of Hallam FC, before a friendly fixture against Sheffield Wednesday in 2012.
- 26 December – The first match between Hallam FC and Sheffield FC took place at Hallam's Sandygate Road ground under the Sheffield Rules. The fixture remains the oldest in world football.

=== 1861 ===
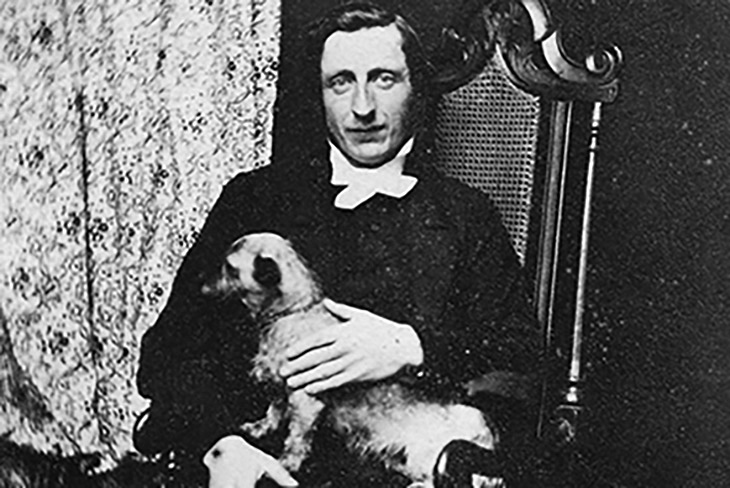
John Charles Thring

- October – Sheffield FC modified its rules governing the goal kick and the throw-in.
- 14 December – An article in The Field called for a common code of football. It inspired Charles Thring, an Uppingham School teacher, in his efforts to create such a code. He was strongly opposed to the Rugby School version of football and championed a strict offside law.
- 28 December – The Field published a letter from Thring in which he outlined his ideas for the "very first principles of football" including offside, use of a round ball and goals to be scored by kicking the ball under (not over) the crossbar.

=== 1862 ===
- 31 January – A new version of the Sheffield Rules introduced the rouge (borrowed from the Eton field game) as a tiebreaker. Goal dimensions were specified for the first time with two goal "sticks" twelve feet apart and a crossbar (or tape) nine feet above the ground. The change of ends at half-time was introduced but it only happened if a goal had been scored. There was still no offside law.
- 1 October – Following correspondence throughout the year, Charles Thring published a pamphlet called The Rules of Foot-ball: The Winter Game. Revised for the use of schools. It proposed a set of laws for what Thring called "The Simplest Game".
- Unknown date – Foundation of Notts County, recognised as the world's oldest professional football club. County began as a "gentlemen-only" club and played a form of football that has been loosely termed the Nottingham Rules.

=== 1863 ===
- Summer – Ahead of the 1863–64 season, Sheffield FC adopted a "single player" offside rule which required that there must be at least one defending player between the goal and the first attacking player (or level with him).
- Monday, 26 October – In an effort to resolve the common rules issue, representatives of twelve clubs and schools in the London area met at the Freemasons' Tavern, in Great Queen Street. The meeting was organised by Ebenezer Cobb Morley, founder of Barnes FC, for the purpose of "forming an Association with the object of establishing a definite code of rules for the regulation of the game". The Football Association was founded with eleven clubs joining at the outset.

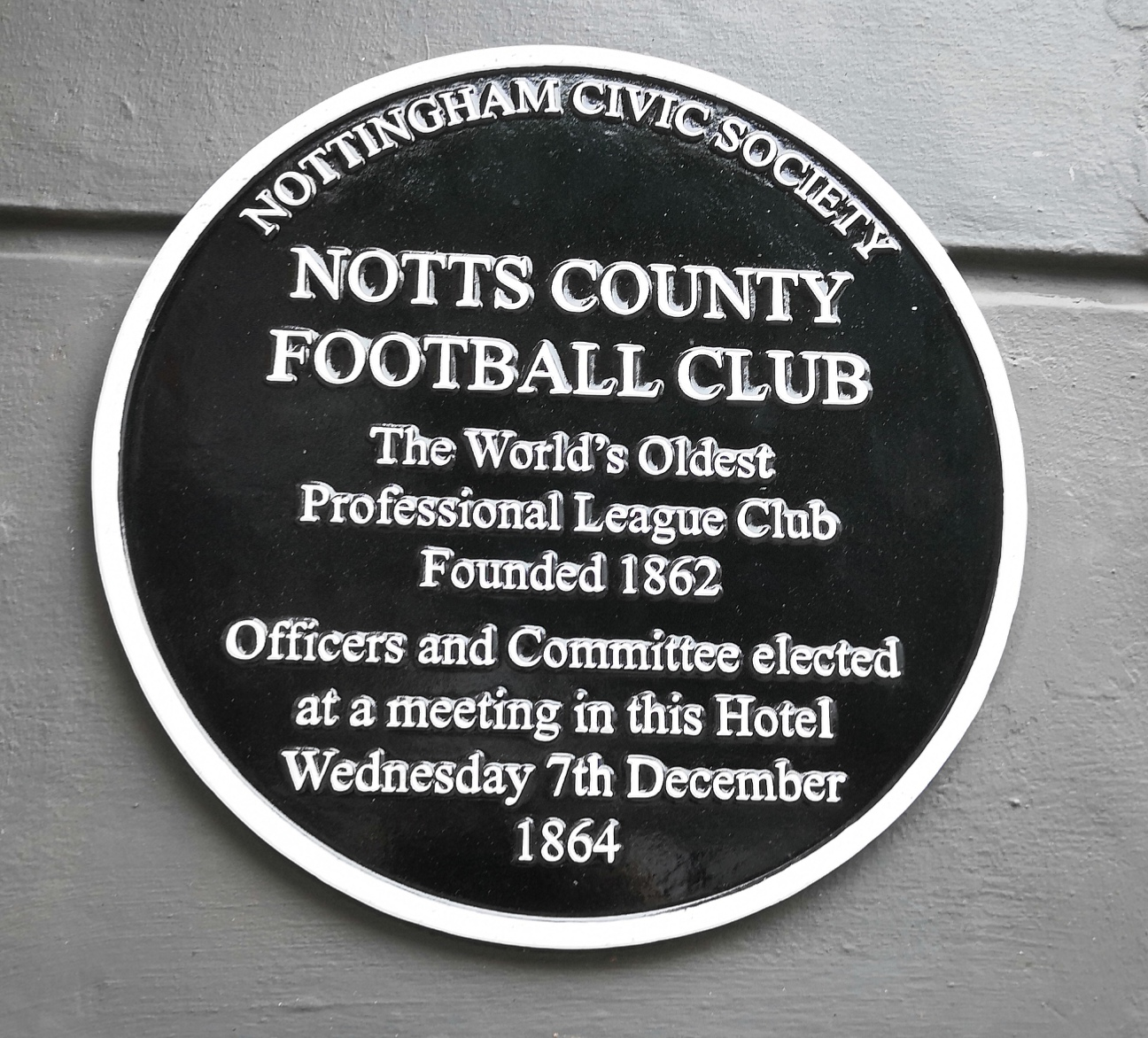
Plaque at the George Hotel, Nottingham, to commemorate the formal constitution of Notts County FC on 7 December 1864.

- 26 October to 8 December – The new FA held a total of six meetings to try and determine the rules of play. They envisaged a game played primarily with the feet and banned running with the ball in hand. Hacking was also forbidden. They did allow the fair catch, however, and as in Sheffield this earned a free kick. The bans on handling and hacking led to the withdrawals of both Blackheath and Richmond who, along with other clubs which favoured Rugby rules, formed the Rugby Football Union in 1871. The game created by the FA became known as association football to distinguish it from rugby football.

=== 1864 ===
- 7 December – Having been founded as an ad hoc team in 1862, Notts County was formally established as Notts FC.

=== 1865 ===
- 2 January – Sheffield FC went to Nottingham to play their first match outside the Sheffield area, against Notts FC. The game was eighteen-a-side under the local Nottingham Rules.
- Unknown date – Foundation of Nottingham Forest by shinty players at the Clinton Arms pub on Shakespeare Street in Nottingham.

=== 1866 ===
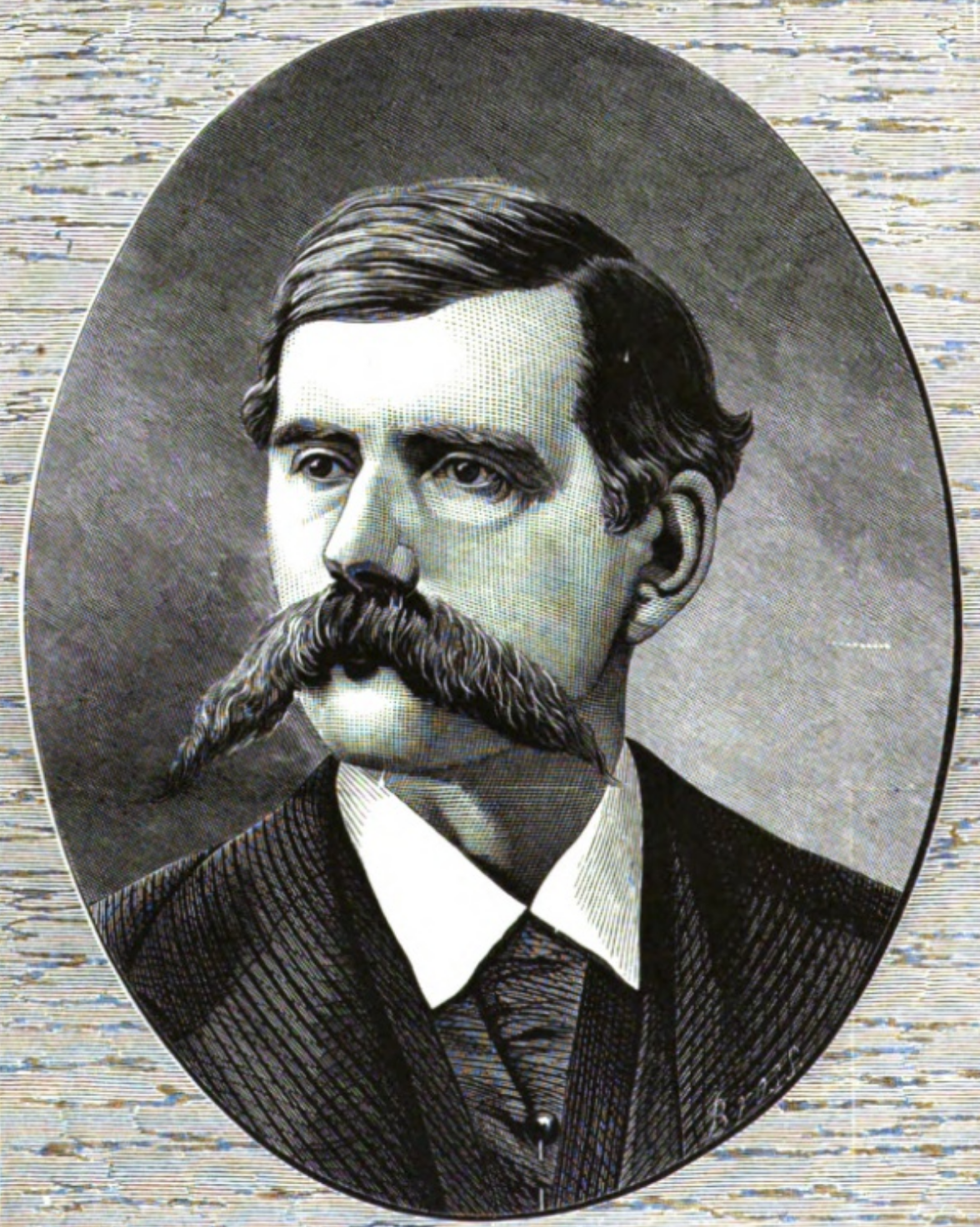
Arthur Pember

- 22 February – At its Annual General Meeting (AGM), the FA formulated their second version of the Laws of the Game. These included the introductions of both the three-man offside rule and the crossbar (then a tape) with the stipulation that the ball must pass beneath it for a goal. Although the touchdown was temporarily retained, the resultant conversion was abolished as was the clean catch to earn a free kick.
- 22 March – First Nottingham derby between Forest and County.
- 31 March – The London v Sheffield match was played under FA rules in Battersea Park, London. The London team, captained by Arthur Pember, was representative and won by two goals and four touchdowns to nil.
- October to December – Analysis of the sporting press has revealed that a total of 122 known matches were played in and around London during this period (the total rose to 170 in the same three months of 1867).

=== 1867 ===
- 12 February – Opening of the Youdan Cup in Sheffield as the world's first-ever organised tournament in any code of football. Twelve local clubs took part, playing under the Sheffield Rules: Broomhall, Fir Vale, Garrick, Hallam (winners), Heeley, Mackenzie, Mechanics, Milton, Norfolk, Norton, Pitsmoor and Wellington. Sheffield FC declined to take part.
- 26 February – At its AGM, the FA abolished the touchdown and placed additional limitations on handling. The new FA Secretary, R. G. Graham undertook to correspond with all known clubs throughout England in an effort to increase membership which totalled only ten clubs.
- 5 March – The Youdan Cup Final was played at Bramall Lane between Hallam and Norfolk. The score was nil-all in goals but Hallam won by two rouges (touchdowns) to one.
- March – The Sheffield & Hallamshire County Football Association was formed by Sheffield FC and the twelve clubs that had competed in the Youdan Cup. This is the world's second-oldest football association after the FA itself. The new association took immediate ownership of the Sheffield Rules and issued its own first version. Sheffield & Hallamshire teams played under the Sheffield Rules until 1877 when they adopted the FA rules.
- 20 June – The first recorded football match in Argentina was played at Parque Tres de Febrero, Palermo, Buenos Aires, by two teams of British railway workers.
- 9 July – Foundation of Queen's Park FC in Glasgow. It is the oldest Scottish association football club.
- 4 September – Foundation of Sheffield Wednesday at the Adelphi Hotel in Sheffield by members of the Wednesday Cricket Club who wanted to play a winter sport to maintain fitness. The team played its first match on 19 October. The club was known as Wednesday Football Club until 1929 when they added Sheffield to their name.
- 19 October – Chesterfield F.C. was formed as an offshoot of Chesterfield Cricket Club in October 1867.
- West Kent Football Club were founded in 1867 by a core of Old Rugbeians including Arthur Guillemard. Playing at Chislehurst Common, they first played football using both Association rules and Rugby School rules.

=== 1868 ===
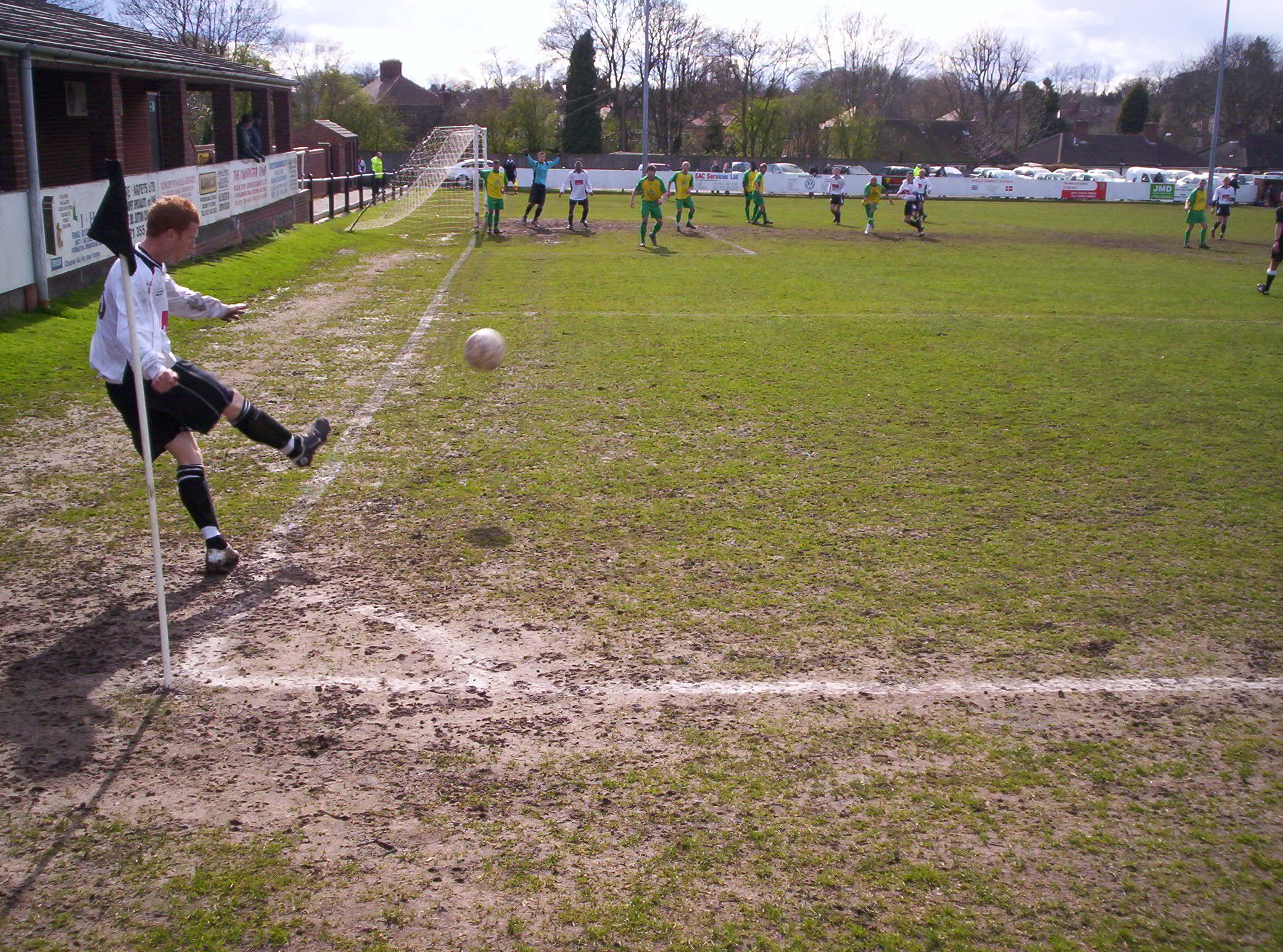
A player takes a corner kick.

- February – The second oldest football tournament in the world, the Cromwell Cup, was played under the Sheffield Rules. The four clubs taking part were Sheffield Wednesday (the winners), Exchange, Garrick and Wellington.
- 1 August – Queen's Park played their first competitive match against the now-defunct Thistle FC and won 2–0.
- October – An early version of the corner kick was included in the Sheffield Rules at the request of Norfolk F.C. It differed significantly from the modern version in that it could be awarded to either side depending on who played the ball over the goal-line. There was an exception in that if the ball went directly over the crossbar, and regardless of who played it last, the decision was a goal-kick by the defending team. The FA adopted the Sheffield version of the corner kick in 1872.
- October – Stoke Ramblers FC played their first documented match against E. W. May's XV. The club became Stoke FC in 1878 and then Stoke City in 1925 after Stoke-on-Trent was granted city status. Stoke City claim to have been founded in 1863 but there is contemporary evidence for the club's foundation in 1868 and, in 2019, the English Football League (EFL) declared that Nottingham Forest (founded 1865) was the EFL's oldest club ahead of the 2019–20 season, Notts County having been relegated to the National League.

=== 1869 ===
- 5 January – Foundation of Kilmarnock FC, the second-oldest club in Scotland. As would happen on numerous future occasions, the club was formed by a group of local cricketers looking for a sporting pursuit to keep themselves fit and active outside of the cricket season.
- It was about this time that tactics first became evident in football with the designation of positions to appropriate players. This probably began in Scotland when, ahead of an 1869 game against Hamilton Gymnasium F.C., the Queen's Park captain Robert Gardner distributed cards to his colleagues which showed each of them where and how he must play. The Scots soon developed the 2-2-6 formation with fullbacks recognised as distinct from forwards, while halfbacks began to emerge in a sort of midfield role. Forwards, however, still played in a pack to support the man in possession. Dribbling remained the key skill but there was no sign yet of a passing game to use the full width of the field. Queen's Park was the first team to play a passing game a few years later.

== Births ==
=== Unknown ===
- c.1860 – Michael Paton (d. unknown), Scotland international full back in five matches (1883–1886).
- c.1862 – John Marshall (d. unknown), Scotland international in four matches (1885–1887).
- c.1869 – James Hamilton (d. unknown), Scotland international in three matches, scoring three goals (1892–1893).
- c.1869 – William Thomson (d. unknown), Scotland international in four matches (1892–1898).

=== 1860 ===
- 4 March – Eadie Fraser (d. 1886), Scotland international in five matches, scoring four goals (1880–1883).
- 28 August – James McAulay (d. 1943), Scotland international goalkeeper in nine matches (1882–1887).
- unknown date – Arthur Dunn (d. 1902), England international in four matches (1883–1892).
- unknown date – William Anderson (d. unknown), Scotland international in six matches, scoring three goals (1882–1885).
- unknown date – Robert Calderwood (d. unknown), Scotland international in three matches, scoring three goals (1885).

=== 1861 ===
- 3 January – Jack Yates (d. 1917), England international forward in one match (1889), scoring three goals and so one of the five England players to score a hat-trick on his only international appearance.
- 9 January – Howard Vaughton (d. 1937), England international in five matches (1882–1894), scoring six goals.
- February – Alf Jones (d. 1935), England international in three matches (1882–1883).
- 4 March – William Rose (d. 1937), England international goalkeeper in five matches (1884–1891).
- 12 May – Walter Arnott (d. 1931), Scotland international right back in 14 matches (1883–1893).
- 16 June – Arthur Bambridge (d. 1923), England international in three matches (1881–1884).
- 22 June – Leitch Keir (d. 1922), Scotland international in four matches (1886–1888).
- 9 October – William Harrower (d. 1910), Scotland international in three matches, scoring four goals (1882–1886).

=== 1862 ===
- 7 January – John Auld (d. 1932), Scotland international in three matches (1887–1889).
- 13 January – John Forbes (d. 1928), Scotland international in five matches (1884–1887).
- 20 February – Clement Mitchell (d. 1937), England international in five matches (1880–1885), scoring five goals.
- 31 July – Jimmy Brown (d. 1922), England international in five matches (1881–1885), scoring three goals.
- 30 August – John Brodie (d. 1925), England international in three matches (1889–1891).
- 26 September – Charles Heggie (d. 1925), Scotland international in one match, scoring four goals (1886).
- unknown date – John Lindsay (d. 1932), Scotland international goalkeeper in three matches (1888–1893).

=== 1863 ===
- 4 February – Nevill Cobbold (d. 1922), England international in nine matches (1883–1887), scoring six goals.
- 14 February – Herbie Arthur (d. 1930), England international goalkeeper in seven matches (1885–1887).
- 16 February – Ralph Aitken (d. 1928), Scotland international in two matches (1886–1888).
- 13 April – Charlie Mason (d. 1941), England international in three matches (1887–1890).
- 30 April – David Allan (d. 1930), Scotland international in three matches, scoring two goals (1885–1886).
- 19 June – John Goodall (d. 1942), England international in 14 matches (1888–1898), scoring twelve goals.
- 31 August – Billy Crone (d. 1944), Ireland international player (1882–1890, 12 matches) and coach (1897).
- 10 September – Ralph Squire (d. 1944), England international in three matches, all in 1886.
- 30 September – Percy Melmoth Walters (d. 1936), England international in 13 matches (1885–1890).
- 7 November – Alex Higgins (d. 1920), Scotland international in one match, scoring three goals (1885).
- 28 November – Dennis Hodgetts (d. 1945), England international in six matches (1888–1894).
- 16 December – Fred Dewhurst (d. 1895), England international in nine matches (1886–1889), scoring eleven goals.

=== 1864 ===
- 13 May – Frank Shaw (d. unknown), Scotland international in two matches (1884).
- 24 June – Jimmy Forrest (d. 1925), England international in eleven matches (1884–1890).
- 1 August – Benjamin Spilsbury (d. 1938), England international in three matches (1885–1886), scoring five goals.
- 17 August – James Adams (d. 1943), Scotland international in three matches (1889–1893).
- 17 October – George Haworth (d. 1943), England international in five matches (1887–1890).
- 4 November – William Johnstone (d. 1950), Scotland international in three matches (1887–1890).
- 28 December – Thomas Robertson (d. 1924), Scotland international in four matches (1889–1892).
- unknown date – Dan Doyle (d. 1918), Scotland international in eight matches (1892–1898).

=== 1865 ===
- 26 January – Arthur Melmoth Walters (d. 1941), England international in nine matches (1885–1890).
- 2 March – James McCall (d. 1925), Scotland international in five matches, scoring two goals (1886–1890).
- 12 March – Tommy Clare (d. 1929), England international full-back in four matches (1889–1894).
- 10 April – Johnny Holt (d. 1937), England international in ten matches (1890–1900), scoring eight goals.
- 14 April – Joe Lofthouse (d. 1919), England international in seven matches (1885–1890), scoring three goals.
- 23 April – George Brann (d. 1954), England international in three matches (1886–1891).
- 11 June – Jake Madden (d. 1948), Scotland international in two matches, scoring five goals (1893–1895).
- 20 June – Bob Howarth (d. 1938), England international in four matches (1886–1894).
- July – Alexander Hamilton (d. unknown), Scotland international in four matches (1885–1888).
- 17 August – George Clifton (d. 1947), English footballer
- 11 September – Alf Shelton (d. 1923), England international in six matches (1889–1892).
- 2 October – Bob Kelso (d. 1950), Scotland international in seven matches (1885–1898).
- 15 October – Bob Smellie (d. unknown), Scotland international in six matches (1887–1893).
- 15 October – James Kelly (d. 1932), Scotland international in eight matches (1888–1896).
- 27 October – Tinsley Lindley (d. 1940), England international in 13 matches (1886–1891), scoring 14 goals and held the England international goal scoring record from 1888 to 1898.

=== 1866 ===
- 3 January – Charlie Perry (d. 1927), England international in three matches (1890–1893).
- 19 January – Harry Allen (d. 1895), England international in five matches (1888–1890).
- 7 February – Willie Paul (d. 1911), Scotland international in three matches, scoring five goals (1888–1890).
- 16 February – Frank Watt (d. unknown), Scotland international in four matches, scoring three goals (1889–1891).
- 12 March – John McLeod (d. 1953), Scotland international goalkeeper in five matches (1888–1893).
- 5 April – Harry Daft (d. 1945), England international in five matches, scoring three goals (1889–1892).
- 29 April – David Mitchell (d. 1948), Scotland international in five matches (1890–1894).
- 27 August – William Dickson (d. 1910), Scotland international in one match, scoring four goals (1888).
- 18 September – Samuel Johnston (d. 1910), youngest-ever Ireland international at 15 years 154 days; played in five matches (1882–1886) and scored two goals.
- 21 September – William Sellar (d. 1914), Scotland international in nine matches, scoring four goals (1885–1893).
- 6 October – Jimmy Turner (d. 1903), England international in three matches (1893–1898).
- 9 October – Charles Wreford-Brown (d. 1951), England international in four matches (1889–1898).
- 29 October – Ned Doig (d. 1919), Scotland international goalkeeper in five matches (1887–1903).
- 27 November – George Kinsey (d. 1936), England international in four matches (1892–1896).
- 11 December – Jack Southworth (d. 1956), England international in three matches, scoring three goals (1889–1892).
- unknown date – James Allan (d. 1945), Scotland international in two matches, scoring two goals (1887).
- unknown date – James Wilson (d. 1900), Scotland international in four matches (1888–1891).

=== 1867 ===
- 1 April – Albert Allen (d. 1899), England international forward in one match (1888), scoring three goals and so one of the five England players to score a hat-trick on his only international appearance.
- 23 June – Bob Holmes (d. 1955), England international in seven matches (1888–1895).
- 2 July – Bob Boyd (d. 1930), Scotland international in two matches, scoring two goals (1889–1891).
- 20 August – William Berry (d. 1919), Scotland international in four matches (1888–1891).
- 1 September – Alex Latta (d. 1928), Scotland international in two matches, scoring two goals (1888–1889).
- 19 December – Arthur Henfrey (d. 1929), England international in five matches, scoring two goals (1891–1896).
- unknown date – Daniel McArthur (d. 1943), Scotland international in three matches (1895–1899).

=== 1868 ===
- 3 January – Jimmy Oswald (d. 1948), Scotland international in three matches (1889–1897).
- 23 January – Fred Geary (d. 1955), England international forward in two matches (1890–1891), scoring three goals, all on his debut.
- 25 January – Neil Munro (d. 1948), Scotland international in two matches, scoring two goals (1888–1889).
- 4 April – George Cotterill (d. 1950), England international in four matches, scoring two goals (1891–1893).
- 14 April – John Willie Sutcliffe (d. 1947), England international goalkeeper in five matches (1893–1903).
- 4 June – Isaac Begbie (d. 1958), Scotland international in four matches (1890–1894).
- 7 June – Billy Moon (d. 1943), England international goalkeeper in seven matches (1888–1891).
- 15 June – Cunliffe Gosling (d. 1922), England international in five matches, scoring two goals (1892–1895).
- 16 June – Jimmy Cowan (d. 1918), Scotland international in three matches (1896–1898).
- 19 June – John McPherson (d. 1926), Scotland international in nine matches, scoring six goals (1888–1897).
- 26 June – Harry Wood (d. 1951), England international in three matches (1890–1896).
- 7 August – Rupert Sandilands (d. unknown), England international in five matches, scoring three goals (1892–1896).
- 11 August – Fred Pelly (d. 1940), England international in three matches (1893–1894).
- 20 August – Willie Groves (d. 1908), Scotland international in three matches, scoring four goals (1888–1890).
- 30 October – Donald Sillars (d. 1905), Scotland international in five matches (1891–1895).
- 18 December – John Lambie (d. 1923), Scotland international in three matches (1886–1888).

=== 1869 ===
- 27 January – Billy Bassett (d. 1937), England international in 16 matches, scoring eight goals (1888–1896).
- 21 February – Jack Reynolds (d. 1917), international half back for both Ireland (1890–1891, 5 matches) and England (1892–1897, 8 matches); won three FA Cup winners medals with West Bromwich Albion and Aston Villa.
- 26 February – Olphert Stanfield (d. 1952), Ireland international forward in 30 matches (1887–1897), scoring eleven goals; the most-capped international of the 19th century.
- 4 March – Davie Baird (d. 1946), Scotland international in three matches (1890–1892).
- 18 March – Hughie Wilson (d. 1940), Scotland international in four matches (1890–1904).
- 14 June – Edgar Chadwick (d. 1942), England international in seven matches, scoring three goals (1891–1897).
- 28 June – John Barker (d. 1941), Scotland international in two matches, scoring four goals (1893–1894).
- 19 July – John Veitch (d. 1914), England international forward in one match (1894), scoring three goals and so one of the five England players to score a hat-trick on his only international appearance.
- 22 July – Walter Gilliat (d. 1963), England international forward in one match (1893), scoring three goals and so one of the five England players to score a hat-trick on his only international appearance.
- 23 July – Albert Smith (d. 1921), England international in three matches (1891–1893).
- 6 October – Jack Bell (d. unknown), Scotland international in ten matches, scoring five goals (1890–1900).
- 20 October – Alex Keillor (d. 1960), Scotland international in six matches, scoring two goals (1891–1897).
- 1 November – Fred Wheldon (d. 1924), England international in four matches, scoring six goals (1897–1898).
- unknown date – James Sharp (d. unknown), Scotland international in five matches (1904–1909).

== Bibliography ==
- Farnsworth, Keith (1995). Sheffield Football: A History. Volume 1, 1857–1961. Sheffield: Hallamshire Press. ISBN 978-1-87-471813-0.
- Murphy, Brendan (2007). From Sheffield with Love. Sports Book Limited. ISBN 978-1-89-980756-7.
- Sanders, Richard (2009). Beastly Fury – The Strange Birth of British Football. London: Transworld. ISBN 978-0-55-381935-9.
- Young, Percy M. (1964). Football in Sheffield. San Francisco: Dark Peak.
