= 1886–87 Dumbarton F.C. season =

Dumbarton
1886–87 season
- Stadium: Boghead Park, Dumbarton
- Scottish Cup: Runners Up
Home colours

The 1886–87 season was the 14th Scottish football season in which Dumbarton competed at a national level.

== Scottish Cup ==
Dumbarton reached their fourth Scottish Cup final full of confidence, especially having defeated Queen's Park in the semi-final, but it wasn't to be and Dumbarton lost out to the East of Scotland Shield holders Hibernian by the odd goal in three.

11 September 1886 Cup round 1	Dumbarton	5–0	Vale of Leven Hibernian	Boghead Park
	Keir, W 46'; Brown; McMillan; Hartley			Referee: J Turner

2 October 1886 Cup round 2	Dumbarton	4–0	Yoker	Boghead Park
	Brown 55'; Jamieson

Cup round 3	Dumbarton	Walkover	Tollcross

Cup round 5	Dumbarton	Walkover	Dundee Harp

25 December 1886 Cup round 6	Hurlford	0–0	Dumbarton	Corsehill Park, Hurlford

8 January 1887 Cup round 6r	Dumbarton	1–2; VOID	Hurlford	Boghead Park
	Robertson 30'		scrimmage McKnight 55'

22 January 1887 Cup round 6r	Dumbarton	3–1	Hurlford	Boghead Park
	Jamieson 55'; Keir 52'; Madden 75'		Scobie 50'

29 January 1887 Cup Semi-final	Queen's Park	1–2	Dumbarton	Hampden Park
	Hamilton 9'		Robertson 70', 80'	Attendance: 3,000; Referee: S Turner

12 February 1887 Cup Final	Dumbarton	1–2	Hibernian	Cathkin Park
	Aitken 59'		Montgomerie 65'; Groves 67'	Attendance: 15,000; Referee: R Brown

== Dumbartonshire Cup ==
Dumbarton met their old rivals Renton in the third round and found them to be too good on the day.

Round 1	Dumbarton	Walkover	Dumbarton Rock

20 November 1886 Round 2	Yoker	0–9	Dumbarton	Holm Park, Yoker
			Lapsley 30'; Lindsay; Keir, L McMillan; Keir, W

11 December 1886 Round 3	Dumbarton	1–2	Renton	Boghead Park
	89'		Kelly	Attendance: 4,000; Referee: Mr Mackenzie

== Glasgow Charity Cup ==
It was much the same story in the Glasgow Charity Cup, where Dumbarton fell at the first hurdle to Queen's Park.

16 April 1887 First Round	Dumbarton	0–3	Queen's Park	Cathkin Park
			Allan 20'; Lambie 30'; Watt 65'	Attendance: 5,500

== Friendlies ==
During the season, 29 'friendly' matches were played, including home and away ties against Rangers and 3rd LRV, matches against Lanarkshire Cup holders, Airdrie; Renfrewshire Cup holders, Abercorn and Stirlingshire Cup holders East Stirling and a two match north of Scotland tour in the New Year Holidays. In addition, four matches were played against English opposition, including a north of England tour during Easter. In all, 9 were won, 7 drawn and 13 lost, scoring 63 goals and conceding 67.

14 August 1886 Friendly	Bo'ness	0–4	Dumbarton	Newtown Park, Bo'ness
			55'	Referee: J Erskine

18 August 1886 Friendly	Port Glasgow Athletic	3–6	Dumbarton	Clune Park
	Coogan 5'; Dowling		Keir, W 12'; Wilson 13'; Kerr 27' scrimmage

21 August 1886 Friendly	St Bernard's	2–0	Dumbarton	Powderhall Stadium
	Arthur; Barnet

28 August 1886 Friendly	Rangers	2–1	Dumbarton	Kinning Park
	Peacock 22'; Heggie		Aitken 20'

4 September 1886 Friendly	(England) Accrington	3–1	Dumbarton	Thorneyholme Road
	Bryce 5'; Yates 30'; Bonar		Brown	Attendance: 1,000; Referee: Mr Rose

18 September 1886 Friendly	Renton	0–0	Dumbarton	Tontine Park
				Attendance: 3,000

25 September 1886 Friendly	Dumbarton	5–1	Airdrie	Boghead Park
	Tate 10'; Jamieson; Keir, W Keir, L		Hasting 11'

9 October 1886 Friendly	Vale of Leven	1–1	Dumbarton	Alexandria
	Murray 80'		Robertson 10'

16 October 1886 Friendly	Cowlairs	7–0	Dumbarton	Gourlay Park, Cowlairs
	Dunbar scrimmage

23 October 1886 Friendly	Dumbarton	6–1	Tollcross	Boghead Park
	Jamieson 5'; Robertson; McAulay		Goal	Attendance: 1,000

30 October 1886 Friendly	Ayr	2–0	Dumbarton	Beresford Park
	scrimmage Christie

6 November 1886 Friendly	Dumbarton	5–5	Rangers	Boghead Park
	scrimmage Lindsay; Jamieson scrimmage scrimmage		Lawrie 80' 90'; Buchanan	Attendance: 2,000

13 November 1886 Friendly	Dumbarton	2–1	Partick Thistle	Boghead Park
	Jamieson		Goal	Attendance: 2,000

27 November 1886 Friendly	Dumbarton	4–0	3rd LRV	Boghead Park
	Madden; Robertson; Keir, W

4 December 1886 Friendly	Dundee Harp	2–2	Dumbarton	East Dock Street Park, Dundee
	scrimmage Lees		Jamieson; Brown	Attendance: 6,000

3 January 1887 Friendly	Our Boys Dundee	3–5	Dumbarton	West Craigie Park, Dundee
	Low; McIntosh; Grant		Madden 82'; Hartley; Jamieson 85'	Attendance: 3,000

4 January 1887 Friendly	Arbroath	2–0	Dumbarton	Gayfield Park
	Buick; Sim

5 February 1887 Friendly	Morton	1–0	Dumbarton	Cappielow Park
	McKendrick 46'			Attendance: 3,000; Referee: Mr Bell

19 February 1887 Friendly	Thistle	3–2	Dumbarton	Beechwood Park, Glasgow
	Young		scrimmage

26 February 1887 Friendly	St Johnstone	3–3	Dumbarton	Recreation Grounds (Perth)
	Menzies; Ormond; Scott		15'; Keir, L 17'

5 March 1887 Friendly	Dumbarton	3–2	Battlefield	Boghead Park
	Jamieson 89'		scrimmage

19 March 1887 Friendly	Dumbarton	1–1	Port Glasgow	Boghead Park
	Madden		Goal

24 March 1887 Friendly	Montrose	4–6	Dumbarton	Links Park
	McDonald; 65'; 80'		Aitken scrimmage Madden	Attendance: 2,500

26 March 1887 Friendly	Abercorn	3–3	Dumbarton	Blackstoun Park, Paisley
	Johnston scrimmage McCormick		Madden scrimmage	Attendance: 4,000

3 April 1887 Friendly	3rd LRV	2–1	Dumbarton	Cathkin Park (1872–1903)
	Goal		Jamieson	Attendance: 3,000

8 April 1887 Friendly	Dumbarton	1–5	(England) Accrington	Boghead Park
	Madden		Conway Bonar	Attendance: 3,000

9 April 1887 Friendly	(England) Preston North End	2–0	Dumbarton	Deepdale Stadium
	Ross; Goodall 35'			Attendance: 7,000

11 April 1887 Friendly	(England) Blackburn Rovers	3–0	Dumbarton	Leamington Road
	Fecitt 65'; Walton 70'; Townsley			Attendance: 5,000

19 April 1887 Friendly	East Stirling	5–2	Dumbarton	Leamington Road
	Stewart 30'; McLauchlan 50'; Reid; Dunn		Honeyman 35' (o.g.)	Attendance: 5,000

== Player statistics ==
Of note amongst those donning the club's colours for the first time were John Madden and William Robertson.
At the same time 5-time internationalist Michael Paton was lost from the club's squad.

Only includes appearances and goals in competitive Scottish Cup matches.

Player	Position	Appearances	Goals
(Scotland) James McAulay	GK	6	0
(Scotland) R Fergus	DF	6	0
(Scotland) Jock Hutcheson	DF	5	0
(Scotland) J Dennett	DF	1	0
(Scotland) Tom McMillan	MF	6	0
(Scotland) Peter Miller	MF	6	0
(Scotland) Ralph Aitken	FW	2	1
(Scotland) Robert 'Plumber' Brown	FW	6	3
(Scotland) David Hartley	FW	4	1
(Scotland) R Jamieson	FW	5	3
(Scotland) Leitch Keir	FW	6	1
(Scotland) W Keir	FW	1	2
(Scotland) William Lapsley	FW	1	0
(Scotland) John Madden	FW	3	1
(Scotland) John McMillan	FW	1	1
(Scotland) William Robertson	FW	6	3
(Scotland) Pete Tait	FW	1	0

=== International caps ===
An international trial match was played on 5 March 1887 to consider selection of teams to represent Scotland in the upcoming games in the 1887 British Home Championship. Leitch Keir, James McAulay and Willie Robertson all took part.

Subsequently, four Dumbarton players were selected to play for Scotland, as follows:

- Leitch Keir earned his third and fourth caps against England and Wales respectively. Keir scored in the 3–2 win over England.

- James McAulay earned his eighth and ninth caps against England and Wales respectively.

- Tom McMillan earned his first cap against Ireland.

- Willie Robertson earned his first and second caps against England and Wales respectively. Robertson scored in the 2–0 win over Wales.

=== Representative Matches ===
Dumbarton players were selected to play for the Dumbartonshire county team as follows:

Date	Opponent	Result	Players (Goals)
16 October 1886	Lancashire	3-4	Brown; Hartley; Keir; McAulay; Robertson (2)
26 February 1887	Renfrewshire	3-1	Aitken (1); Hutcheson; Miller, P

In addition Leitch Keir was selected to play in the West of Scotland side which played an East of Scotland XI on 24 May 1887. The 'West' won 3–1.

== Reserve team ==
Dumbarton rejoined the Second Eleven Association and duly reached their third final in the Scottish Second XI Cup in four attempts before losing out to the holders, Abercorn, after a drawn match.

In addition, Dumbarton entered the Dumbartonshire Second XI Cup competition, and reached the semi-final before losing to eventual winners, Renton.
