= 1878 in association football =

The following are the association football events of the year 1878 throughout the world.

== Events ==
- October 14 - First ever floodlit football match takes place at Bramall Lane, Sheffield between teams chosen by the Sheffield Association and local clubs.

=== England ===
- Ashton United F.C.
- Burnham F.C.
- Everton F.C.
- Grimsby Town F.C.
- Ipswich Town F.C.
- Newton Heath L&YR F.C. (later to become Manchester United)
- Matlock Town F.C.
- West Bromwich Albion F.C.

=== Scotland ===
- Airdrieonians F.C. (1878)
- Arbroath F.C.

== Domestic cups ==
Nation	Tournament	Winners	Score	Runner-up	Venue	Title	Last title won
England	1877–78 FA Cup	Wanderers	3-1	Royal Engineers	Kennington Oval	5th	1877
Scotland	1877–78 Scottish Cup	Vale of Leven	1-0	3rd Lanark RV	Hampden Park	2nd	1877
Wales	1877–78 Welsh Cup	Wrexham	1-0	Druids	Acton Park	1st	None

== Births ==
- 1 February – James Suddick (d. 1967), English footballer
- 13 April – Frank Stubbs (d. 1944), English footballer
- 15 April – John May (d. 1933), Scotland international forward in five matches (1906–1909).
- 16 April – Tip Foster (d. 1914), England international forward in five matches (1900–1902), scoring three goals; the only man to captain England at both football and cricket.
- 12 June – Charles Thomson (d. 1936), Scotland international half-back in 21 matches (1904–1914), scoring four goals.
- 8 July – Jimmy Quinn (d. 1945), Scotland international forward in eleven matches (1905–1912), scoring seven goals.
- 12 November – Tom Jackson (d. 1916), Scotland international player in six matches (1904–1907).
- 5 December – Arthur Marbles (d. 1964), English footballer.
- 26 December – Alex Raisbeck (d. 1949), Scotland international full-back in eight matches (1900–1907).
- 29 December – Sammy Day (d. 1950), England international forward in three matches (1906), scoring two goals.
- unknown – Sandy MacFarlane (d. 1945), Scotland international forward in five matches (1904–1911).
