= Lycée Théodore Monod =

Lycée Théodore Monod or Lycée Français Théodore Monod (LFTM) can refer to:

- Lycée professionnel Théodore-Monod in Noisy-le-Sec, France (Paris area)
- Lycée Français Théodore Monod (Mauritania) (LFTM) in Nouakchott, Mauritania
- Lycée Français Théodore Monod (United Arab Emirates) (LfTM or LTM) in Abu Dhabi, United Arab Emirates
