= George Clifton =

George Clifton may refer to:

- George Clifton (plant collector) (1823–1913), English collector of seaweed specimens, active in Australia
- George Clifton (footballer) (1865–1947), English footballer
- George Herbert Clifton (1898–1970), officer in the New Zealand Military Forces
