= Frank Stubbs =

Frank Stubbs may refer to:

- Frank Stubbs (Australian footballer) (1919–1997), Australian rules footballer
- Frank Stubbs (footballer, born 1878) (1878–1944), English footballer
- Frank Stubbs (ice hockey) (1909–1993), American ice hockey player
- Frank Edward Stubbs (1888–1915), Victoria Cross recipient
- Frank Stubbs (American football), college football player
- the protagonist of Frank Stubbs Promotes, a British television programme starring Timothy Spall
