= 1886–87 Morton F.C. season =

Morton
1886–87 season
- Scottish Cup: Fifth round (lost to Hurlford)

The 1886–87 season was Morton Football Club's tenth season in which they competed at a national level. The club competed in the 14th Scottish Cup.

== Fixtures and results ==
Win Draw Loss Postponed

=== Scottish Cup ===
| 11 September 1886 First round | Lochwinnoch | 0 – 6 | Morton |
| | | | ,,,,, |

| 2 October 1886 Second round | Thornliebank | 0 – 2 | Morton |
| | | | ? Norris |

| Third round | Morton | bye |

| 6 November 1886 Fourth round | Morton | 11 – 0 | Carfin Shamrock | Cappielow Park |
| | ,,,,,,,,,, | | | Attendance: 2000; Referee: Walter Crighton (Queen's Park) |

| 4 December 1886 Fifth round | Hurlford | 5 – 1 | Morton | Corsehill Park |
| | McSkimming, Gray ? Duff | | Fleming | Attendance: 2000; Referee: Walter Crighton (Queen's Park) |
