= Ahmed Ahmedou =

Mauritanian footballer and engineer

Personal information
- Full name: Ahmed Ahmedou
- Date of birth: 27 August 1993 (age 33)
- Place of birth: Nouakchott, Mauritania
- Position: Left-back

Youth career
- 2011–2012: AS Saint-Étienne

Senior career*
Years	Team	Apps	(Gls)
2012–2013	Brentford		
2013–2016	Three Bridges		
2016–2017	CD Tháder Rojales		

International career^{‡}
2013–2014	Mauritania U23		
2014–2017	Mauritania		
- * Club domestic league appearances and goals as of 17 September 2025 ‡ National team caps and goals as of 17 September 2025

Ahmed "Doudou" Ahmedou (born 27 August 1993) is a retired Mauritanian footballer and engineer. He played as a left-back and represented the Mauritania U23 as well as the senior Mauritania national football team. Alongside his sporting career, Ahmedou has worked as a project engineer in the mining industry and as a finance consultant. He also holds French citizenship.

== Early life and education ==
Ahmedou was born in Nouakchott, Mauritania. He attended the Lycée Français Théodore Monod in Nouakchott, where he earned a scientific baccalauréat in 2011, before studying at Lycée Claude Fauriel in Saint-Étienne, France.

He later moved to the United Kingdom to study mechanical engineering at the University of Sussex, graduating with a Bachelor of Engineering degree in 2016. He also completed a Master's degree in Finance at the University of Murcia in Spain in 2017.

== Club career ==
Ahmedou trained in the youth ranks of AS Saint-Étienne in 2011–2012.

In mid-2013, he spent a short spell with Brentford F.C. before moving to England’s non-league system with Three Bridges, where he played from 2013 to 2016 while combining football with his studies.

After leaving England, Ahmedou moved to Spain, joining CD Tháder Rojales.

Ahmedou retired from professional football after his stint in Spain to focus on his engineering and finance career.

== International career ==
Ahmedou holds Mauritanian and French nationalities. He represented the Mauritania U23 before earning his first senior call-up. He made his senior debut for the Mauritania national football team on 5 March 2014 in a 1–1 draw against Niger in Nouakchott.

== Professional career outside football ==
Beyond football, Ahmedou has developed a career in engineering and finance. Since 2018, he has worked as a project engineer for First Quantum Minerals in Zambia. He has also served as a finance control consultant for Greenpeace in Washington, D.C. in 2017.
