= 1887 Scottish Cup final =

- Event: 1886–87 Scottish Cup
Hibernian	Dumbarton
2	1
- Date: 12 February 1887
- Venue: Hampden Park, Crosshill
- Attendance: 15,000

The 1887 Scottish Cup final was the 14th final of the Scottish Cup and the final of the 1886–87 Scottish Cup, the most prestigious knockout football competition in Scotland. The match was played at the second Hampden Park in Crosshill (today part of Glasgow) on 12 February 1887 and was watched by a crowd of 15,000 spectators. The final was contested by the 1883 winners Dumbarton and Hibernian who had never won the competition before.

This was only the third Scottish Cup final not to feature a team from Glasgow after the 1883 and 1885 finals.

== Background ==
Dumbarton had reached the final on three previous occasions losing after a replay twice to Queen's Park in 1881 and 1882 before beating Vale of Leven after a replay to lift the trophy in 1883.

Hibernian had been relatively successful in the Scottish Cup after reaching the fifth round on their first appearance in 1877–78. Their best performance prior to 1886–87 had come in the three previous seasons when they were knocked in the semi-finals. No team from Edinburgh – or indeed the East of Scotland – had previously reached the final.

The two teams had been drawn to face each other on three previous occasions. Dumbarton beat Hibernian 6–2 three times – although one was successfully protested – in 1879–80 and 1881–82 before Hibernian came out on top after a replay in 1885–86.

== Route to the final ==
=== Hibernian ===
Round	Opposition	Score
First round	Durhamstown Rangers	6–1
Second round	Mossend Swifts	1–1
Second round replay	Mossend Swifts	3–0
Third round	Heart of Midlothian	5–1
Fourth round	bye	
Fifth round	Queen of the South Wanderers	7–3
Quarter-final	3rd Lanark RV	2–1
Semi-final	Vale of Leven	3–1

=== Dumbarton ===
Round	Opposition	Score
First round	Vale of Leven Hibernians	5–0
Second round	Yoker	4–0
Third round	Tollcross	w/o
Fourth round	bye	
Fifth round	Dundee Harp	w/o
Quarter-final	Hurlford	0–0
Quarter-final replay	Hurlford	1–2 (match void)
Quarter-final second replay	Hurlford	3–1
Semi-final	Queen's Park	2–0

Notes

1. A-Result declared void and a replay was ordered.

Dumbarton's route to the final was not without controversy. It walked over Harp of Dundee in the fifth round; Dumbarton had been drawn at home, but accepted an £18 inducement to travel to Harp, as Harp could not afford to travel to Dumbarton. One of the consequences was that Harp conceded the tie and agreed the match should be a friendly, but advertised the match as a Cup tie, which ended 2–2.

Dumbarton lost 2–1 to the Ayrshire minnows of Hurlford at home in the quarter-final, but put in a protest on the basis that the pitch was too slippery for effective play; the Scottish FA favoured the bigger club so much that it declared the tie to have been null and void in its entirety, and even censured Hurlford for insisting on playing, so Hurlford did not even have the benefit of a replay at home. The Scottish FA's dismissal of a Hurlford counter-protest was generally considered unfair; the counter-protest was heard the same night as the Scottish FA considered a protest by Queen's Park against Dumbarton's rough play in the semi-final.

== Match details ==
12 February 1887
15:00

Hibernian	2–1	Dumbarton
Montgomery 65'; Groves 67'		Aitken 59'

Hampden Park, Crosshill
Attendance: 15,000

Hibernian	Dumbarton

Hibernian:
GK	John Tobin
FB	James Lundie
FB	Barney Fagan
HB	James McGhee
HB	Peter McGinn
HB	James McLaren
RW	Patrick Lafferty
RW	Willie Groves
FW	James Montgomery
LW	George Smith
LW	Philip Clark

Dumbarton:
GK	James McAulay
FB	Jock Hutcheson
FB	R. Fergus
HB	Peter Miller
HB	Thomas McMillan
HB	Leitch Keir
RW	Robert P. Brown
RW	William Robertson
CF	Jake Madden
LW	Ralph Aitken
LW	J. Jamieson

The ground filled up long before kick-off, one of the trains being so filled with spectators that it required two engines, and an estimated 2,000 spectators broke in without paying. The Hibernian supporters were distinguishable by wearing green favours with "Hurry Up Hibs" on them. A harum-scarum first half saw a distinct lack of accurate shooting, with Tobin making one save, M'Aulay none; but Dumbarton started the second better, perhaps riled by supporters' shots of "play the Hurlford" which greeted the players on their return to the pitch. Miller soon grazed the post, and Aitken opened the scoring for the county side after 59 minutes with a "swift shot" over Tobin's head. Madden came close to doubling the lead, also hitting the post, almost straight from the kick-off, but Hibernian equalized in the 65th minute thanks to an error by M'Aulay, who dropped a Clark shot at the feet of Montgomery, who tapped home

Straight from the kick-off, Groves won the ball back for Hibernian, and dribbled down the centre of the pitch; he and Lafferty manoeuvred the ball between themselves, and the Dumbarton players stopped playing, claiming offside. However the resulting goal - credited to Groves by the Glasgow media, Lafferty by the Edinburgh - was given, and Hibernian saw out the game, to the great jubilation of the majority of the crowd, as many of those present were Irish Glaswegians supporting "the wearers of the green".

The match was the last Cup tie in which Dumbarton played in "the Blackburn Rovers style of quartern colours", as from the next season it adopted "black and gold vertical-striped shirts, very smart-looking and attractive".
