= Igor Kulish =

Russian footballer

Personal information
- Date of birth: 27 June 1964 (age 62)
- Place of birth: Luhansk, Ukrainian SSR, Soviet Union
- Position: Goalkeeper

Senior career*
| Years | Team | Apps | (Gls) |
| 1981 | Cement Novorossiysk | 13 | (0) |
| 1982–1983 | Kuban Krasnodar | ? | (0) |
| 1984 | Zorya Luhansk | ? | (0) |
| 1987 | Druzhba Maykop | 1 | (0) |
| 1987–1988 | Kuban Krasnodar | 32 | (0) |
| 1989 | Druzhba Maykop | 25 | (0) |
| 1990–1991 | Chernomorets Burgas | 1 | (0) |
| 1990–1991 | → Nesebar (loan) | 31 | (0) |
| 1991–1992 | Botev Plovdiv | 15 | (0) |
| 1992–1993 | Lokomotiv Plovdiv | 0 | (0) |
| 1993–1994 | Septemvri Sofia | ? | (?) |
| 1994 | Alaskan | ? | (?) |
| 1995–1996 | Malindi | ? | (?) |
| 1996 | Spartak Varna | | |

Managerial career
- 1996–1997: Spartak Varna (goalkeeping coach)
- 1997–1998: Slavia Sofia (goalkeeping coach)
- 1998–1999: Al-Wakrah (goalkeeping coach)
- 1999–2007: Levski Sofia (goalkeeping coach)
- 2008: Karpaty Lviv (goalkeeping coach)
- 2008–2010: Metalurh Donetsk (goalkeeping coach)
- * Club domestic league appearances and goals

Igor Kulish (born 27 June 1964) is a Russian football goalkeeping coach and former goalkeeper.
