= James Wilson (footballer, born 1866) =

Scottish footballer

James Wilson (circa 1866 – 1900) was a Scottish footballer, who played for Vale of Leven and Scotland.
