= Paul Baxter (footballer) =

English footballer

Personal information
- Full name: Paul Albert Baxter
- Date of birth: 22 April 1964 (age 62)
- Place of birth: Hackney, England
- Position: Full back

Youth career
- –1981: Tottenham Hotspur

Senior career*
Years	Team	Apps	(Gls)
1981–1983	Crystal Palace	1	(0)
1983–1984	Leytonstone & Ilford		
1985	Enfield	1	(0)
1985–1987	Dagenham	32	(0)
- * Club domestic league appearances and goals

Paul Albert Baxter (born 22 April 1964 in London Borough of Hackney) is an English former professional footballer who played in the Football League, for Crystal Palace as a defender.

== Playing career ==
Baxter began his career as an apprentice at Tottenham Hotspur and moved to Crystal Palace in September 1981. His one senior appearance for Palace came in the final game of the 1981–82 season in a home 2–1 defeat to Newcastle United and at the end of the following season having played no further games, Baxter moved on to Leytonstone.

== Sources ==
- Paul Baxter at the English National Football Archive (subscription required)
- Harman, John, ed. (2005). Alliance to Conference 1979–2004: The first 25 years. Tony Williams Publications. pp. 231, 235. ISBN 978-1-869833-52-7.
