= James Hutton (footballer) =

Scottish footballer

Personal information
- Date of birth: Edinburgh, Scotland
- Position: Left half

Senior career*
| Years | Team | Apps | (Gls) |
- St Bernard's

International career
| 1887 | Scotland | 1 | (0) |
- * Club domestic league appearances and goals

James Hutton was a Scottish footballer who played as a left half.

== Career ==
Born in Edinburgh, Hutton played club football for St Bernard's, and made one appearance for Scotland in 1887.
