= 1820s in football =

The following are events in the 1820s decade which are relevant to the development of football.

== Events ==
=== 1820 ===
- By this time, some form of order was beginning to be imposed on what had for centuries been a chaotic pastime played not so much by teams as by mobs. This form of football, known more politely as "folk football", was essentially a public holiday event, Shrove Tuesday being a traditional day for games across the country. The games were free-for-alls with no holds barred and extremely violent. As for kicking and handling of the ball, it is certain that both means of moving the ball towards the goals were in use.
- The public schools (e.g., Eton, Harrow, Rugby, Winchester) began to devise their own versions of football, rules of which were verbally agreed and handed down over many years until the first codifications in the 1840s.

=== 1823 ===
- The traditional date of the William Webb Ellis legend. He was the Rugby School pupil who, it was said later, "with a fine disregard for the rules of football, took the ball in his hands and ran with it". Even if the tale is true, the game was a version of folk football with rules that were verbally agreed by the Rugby School pupils. Such rules were always open to challenge and it may be that an incident like this occurred with the result that a dribbling game became primarily a handling one.
- Evidence exists of local games being played within certain limits (field and team sizes) which were similar to modern football in that goalposts, either erected or simulated, were in use as targets. There is a reference to players in East Anglia using their jackets for goalposts.

=== 1824 ===
- Foundation of the Foot-Ball Club, in Edinburgh, thought to have been the first club to have played football of any kind, anywhere in the world.

== Births ==
- 12 March 1820 – Albert Pell (d. 1907), an early influence on the rules of football.
- 18 May 1821 – Jem Mackie (d. 1867), an early influence on the rules of football.

== Bibliography ==
- Sanders, Richard (2009). Beastly Fury – The Strange Birth of British Football. London: Transworld. ISBN 978-0-55-381935-9.
