= Blas Cristaldo =

Paraguayan footballer (born 1964)

Blas Marcelo Cristaldo
Personal information
- Full name: Blas Marcelo Cristaldo Gonzalez
- Date of birth: 9 December 1964 (age 61)
- Place of birth: Piribebuy, Paraguay
- Height: 1.85 m (6 ft 1 in)
- Position: Central defender

International career
Years	Team	Apps	(Gls)
1991	Paraguay	7	(0)

Blas Marcelo Cristaldo González (born 9 December 1964) is a retired association football defender and coach from Paraguay. He played professional football in Paraguay for Cerro Porteño and have been coaching the inferior squads of Cerro Porteño for some years now. Even he was interim coach several times in the first division. Currently as an assistant coach on the national team of Paraguay for Brazil 2014.

== Club career ==
Cristaldo played club football with Cerro Porteño for ten seasons, from 1985 until 1995. He won the Paraguayan championship four times (1987, 1990, 1992 and 1994) with the club.

== International ==
Cristaldo made his international debut for the Paraguay national football team on 14 June 1991 in a Copa Paz de Chaco match against Bolivia (0–1 win). He obtained a total number of seven international caps, including the 1991 Copa America in Chile scoring no goals for the national side. And also played in Peru, the team Sipesa for 1 year (1993)
