= Thierry Villa =

French footballer (born 1964)

Personal information
- Full name: Thierry Villa
- Date of birth: 7 September 1964 (age 62)
- Place of birth: Béziers, France
- Position: Forward

Team information
- Current team: Agde (manager)

Senior career*
Years	Team	Apps	(Gls)
1985–1987	Béziers	20	(4)
1987	Montpellier B	1	(0)
1987–2000	Agde	118+	(29+)

Managerial career
- 2003–: Agde
- * Club domestic league appearances and goals

Thierry Villa (born 7 September 1964) is a French former professional footballer who played as a defender. He is currently the manager of Championnat de France amateur Group C side Agde, a position he has held since 2003.

Villa started his career with Division 2 club Béziers in 1985, and went on to score 4 goals in 20 matches during a spell lasting almost two seasons. He then joined Montpellier, but appeared only once for the club's reserve team. In 1987, Villa signed for Division d'Honneur side Agde and four years later he was part of the team that won promotion to Division 4. Between 1992 and 1996, he made 118 league appearances for Agde, scoring 29 goals in that period. Villa continued to play for Agde until 2000, when he retired from playing.

In 2003, Villa was appointed manager of his former club Agde.

In his spare time, Villa plays guitar in a rock/pop covers group that regularly performs in the Agde area.
