= Anatoli Kertoake =

Russian footballer (born 1964)

Personal information
- Full name: Anatoli Vasiliyevich Kertoake
- Date of birth: 26 October 1964 (age 62)
- Place of birth: Kirov, Russia
- Position: Midfielder

Youth career
- –1988: FC Dynamo Kirov

Senior career*
Years	Team	Apps	(Gls)
1989	FC Dynamo Kirov	8	(0)
1990	FC Elektron Vyatskiye Polyany (amateur)		
1991	FC Dynamo Kirov	16	(0)
1997	FC Mashinostroitel Kirov (amateur)	17	(0)
1998–2000	FC Lokomotiv Kirov (amateur)		

Managerial career
- 2013–2018: FC Spartak-M Kostroma
- 2018–2019: FC Znamya Truda Orekhovo-Zuyevo (assistant)
- 2019–2021: FC Znamya Truda Orekhovo-Zuyevo
- 2021: FC Znamya Noginsk (assistant)
- 2021–2022: FC Znamya Noginsk
- 2022: FC Agat Gavrilov-Yam
- 2022–2023: FC Dynamo Vologda
- * Club domestic league appearances and goals

Anatoli Vasiliyevich Kertoake (Russian: Анатолий Васильевич Кертоакэ; born 26 October 1964) is a Russian former football midfielder and coach.

== Club career ==
He played for such clubs as FC Dynamo Kirov, FC Elektron Vyatskiye Polyany, FC Lokomotiv Kirov.

== Coaching career ==
On July 5, 2021, he was appointed head coach of FC Znamya Noginsk.

In the summer of 2022, he was formally appointed head coach of FC Dynamo Vologda due to the lack of the necessary license from Rudolf Chesalov.
