= Antoni Jeleń =

Polish footballer

Toni Jelen
Personal information
- Full name: Antoni Jelen
- Date of birth: 13 June 1964
- Place of birth: Poland
- Position: Midfielder

Senior career*
Years	Team	Apps	(Gls)
- Górnik Pszów
1992/1993	Bischofswerdaer FV 08	4+	(1+)
1993-1995	1. FC Union Berlin	26+	(1+)
1995/1996	FC Sachsen Leipzig	17	(2)
1995/96-2000	Dynamo Dresden	119	(4)
2000-2001/02	SC Borea Dresden	5+	(5+)
- * Club domestic league appearances and goals

Antoni Jelen (born 13 June 1964 in Poland) is a Polish retired footballer.
