= Andrew Whitelaw (footballer) =

Scottish footballer

Personal information
- Date of birth: 19 May 1865
- Place of birth: Jamestown, Scotland
- Date of death: 1938 (aged 72–73)
- Position: Right back

Senior career*
Years	Team	Apps	(Gls)
- Vale of Leven
- Notts County
- Heanor Town
- Leicester Fosse
- Heanor Town

International career
1887–1890	Scotland	2	(0)
- * Club domestic league appearances and goals

Andrew Whitelaw (19 May 1865 – 1938) was a Scottish footballer who played as a right back.

== Career ==
Born in Jamestown, Whitelaw played club football for Vale of Leven, Notts County, Heanor Town and Leicester Fosse, and made two appearances for Scotland.
