= James Suddick =

English footballer

Personal information
- Full name: James Suddick
- Date of birth: 1 February 1878
- Place of birth: Middlesbrough, England
- Date of death: 1967 (aged 88–89)
- Position: Winger

Senior career*
Years	Team	Apps	(Gls)
1895–1896	South Bank		
1896–1897	Middlesbrough		
1897–1898	Aston Villa	2	(1)
1898–1899	Nottingham Forest	14	(4)
1900–1903	Thornaby		
1903–1904	Middlesbrough	1	(1)
1904	Thornaby		
Total		17	(6)
- * Club domestic league appearances and goals

James Suddick (1 February 1878 – 1967) was an English footballer who played in the Football League for Aston Villa, Middlesbrough and Nottingham Forest.
