= Ceno Aleksandrovski =

Macedonian footballer

Personal information
- Full name: Ceno Aleksandrovski
- Date of birth: 27 January 1964 (age 62)
- Place of birth: SFR Yugoslavia
- Position: Midfielder

Senior career*
Years	Team	Apps	(Gls)
1984–1987	Teteks	59	(6)
1987–1988	Rad	28	(0)
1988–1989	OFK Kikinda	14	(0)
1989–1993	Balkan		
1993–1995	Sileks		
1995–1999	Rabotnichki		
- * Club domestic league appearances and goals

Ceno Aleksandrovski (Macedonian: Цено Александровски; born 27 January 1964) is a retired Macedonian football midfielder.

== Club career ==
He started playing with Macedonian side FK Teteks in 1984 playing at that time in Yugoslav third level. Immediately that first season they achieved promotion, and Aleksandrovski played with Teteks in the following two seasons in the Yugoslav Second League. His consistent performances earned him a move to the capital, Belgrade, and a contract with Serbian side FK Rad playing in the 1987–88 Yugoslav First League. The following season, he moved to Serbian side OFK Kikinda playing in the Yugoslav Second League.

He later worked for the commission for youth football development.
