= Lycée Français Théodore Monod (Mauritania) =

French international school

Coordinates: 18.0919°N 15.9841°W

- Nouakchott; Mauritania

Information
- School type: International School
- Language: French
- Affiliation: AEFE
- Website: https://www.lftm-mr.net/

The Lycée Français Théodore Monod (LFTM) is a French international school in Nouakchott, Mauritania. It serves primary through lycée (senior high school).

It is directly operated by the Agency for French Education Abroad (AEFE), an agency of the French government.
