= George Clifton (footballer) =

English footballer

Personal information
- Full name: George Clifton
- Date of birth: 17 August 1865
- Place of birth: Long Eaton, England
- Date of death: 2 February 1947
- Position: Half back

Senior career*
Years	Team	Apps	(Gls)
1887	Long Eaton Rangers		
1888–1889	Derby County	1	(0)
1889	Long Eaton Rangers		
- * Club domestic league appearances and goals

George Clifton (1865-1947) was an English footballer who played in the Football League for Derby County.

George Clifton played association football for Derbyshire local club Long Eaton Rangers in 1887.

Centre-Half had been a problem position for Derby County in 1888-1889 and various players were tried. Three players had been tried and then J Smith was brought to Derby County and the centre-half position seemed settled. However, for the Boxing Day trip to Wellington Road, Birmingham, then home of Aston Villa Smith was unavailable. George Clifton was signed and he made his debut against Aston Villa. Hopewell and his defending colleagues had a difficult first-half with Villa gaining a 2–0 lead. County goalkeeper, Joseph Marshall, made some "fine saves", and County had hope when they reduced Villa' lead to 2–1. But the County defence could not contain Villa for long and Villa went in 3-1 up at half-time. The second half was more even, but Villa settled the result by taking a 4–1 lead. Then County reduced the arrears towards then end of the game and Villa won 4–2.

George Clifton was returned to Long Eaton Rangers having played just the one match. Derby County finished 10th in the Football League and had to seek re-election. They conceded 61 goals in 22 games, the third worst defence of the season.

Clifton died at the age of 81 in 1947.
