= Tom Jenkinson (footballer) =

Scottish footballer

Personal information
- Full name: Thomas James Jenkinson
- Date of birth: 21 April 1865
- Place of birth: Edinburgh, Scotland
- Position: Right winger

Senior career*
Years	Team	Apps	(Gls)
- Hearts
- Liverpool

International career
1887	Scotland	1	(1)
- * Club domestic league appearances and goals

Thomas James Jenkinson (born 21 April 1865) was a Scottish footballer, who played as a right winger.

== Career ==
Born in Edinburgh, Jenkinson played club football for Hearts and Liverpool, and scored on his sole appearance for Scotland in 1887. He later emigrated to Australia.
