= James Lowe (footballer) =

Scottish footballer

Personal information
- Full name: James Lowe
- Date of birth: 26 November 1863
- Place of birth: Edinburgh, Scotland
- Date of death: 17 July 1922 (aged 58)
- Place of death: Edinburgh, Scotland
- Position: Forward

Senior career*
Years	Team	Apps	(Gls)
1881–1882	Brunswick		
1882–1892	St Bernard's		

International career
1887	Scotland	1	(1)
- * Club domestic league appearances and goals

James Lowe (26 November 1863 – 17 July 1922) was a Scottish footballer who played as a forward, adept at playing on the left wing or in the centre.

== Career ==
Lowe played club football for St Bernard's, was a regular in the Edinburgh representative team throughout the 1880s (19 matches in total against the likes of Glasgow, Lanarkshire, London, Renfrewshire and Sheffield) and made one appearance for Scotland in 1887.
