= Frank Stubbs (footballer, born 1878) =

English footballer

Personal information
- Full name: Francis Lloyd Stubbs
- Date of birth: 13 April 1878
- Place of birth: Woodhouse Eaves, England
- Date of death: 1944 (aged 65–66)
- Position: Goalkeeper

Senior career*
Years	Team	Apps	(Gls)
1895–1896	Woodhouse Rovers		
1896–1897	Quorn Havelock		
1897–1898	Woodhouse United		
1898–1899	Coalville Albion		
1899–1900	Loughborough	33	(0)
1900–1903	The Wednesday	18	(0)
1904–1908	Loughborough Wednesday		
1908–1912	Woodhouse Eaves		
1912	Loughborough Old Boys		
Total		51	(0)
- * Club domestic league appearances and goals

Francis Lloyd Stubbs (13 April 1878 – 1944) was an English footballer who played in the Football League for Loughborough and The Wednesday.
