= Arthur Marbles =

English footballer

Personal information
- Full name: Emmerson Arthur Marbles
- Date of birth: 5 December 1878
- Place of birth: Chesterfield, England
- Date of death: 1964 (aged 85–86)
- Place of death: Chesterfield, England
- Position: Full-back

Senior career*
Years	Team	Apps	(Gls)
1900–1901	Dronfield Town		
1901–1907	Chesterfield Town	146	(10)
1907–1908	Sunderland	10	(0)
1908–1910	Chesterfield Town		
1910–191?	Eckington Works		
- * Club domestic league appearances and goals

Emmerson Arthur Marbles (5 December 1878 – 1964) was an English professional footballer who played as a full-back for Sunderland.
