= William Robertson (1880s footballer) =

Scottish footballer

Personal information
- Full name: William Robertson
- Date of birth: 24 March 1866
- Place of birth: Dumbarton, Scotland
- Date of death: 9 December 1926 (aged 60)
- Place of death: Dumbarton, Scotland
- Position: Right winger

Senior career*
Years	Team	Apps	(Gls)
1886–1893	Dumbarton	2	(0)

International career
1887	Scotland	2	(1)
- * Club domestic league appearances and goals

William Robertson (24 March 1866 – 9 December 1926) was a Scottish footballer who played as a right winger.

== Career ==
Robertson played club football for Dumbarton, featuring on the losing side in the 1887 Scottish Cup Final; he was no longer a regular by the 1890s due to work commitments and had no involvement with their success in the first two seasons of the Scottish Football League.

He played twice for Scotland in 1887 (wins over England and Wales, in which he scored).

== Personal life ==
Born in Dumbarton, Robertson attended Blairlodge School (Polmont) and the University of Glasgow, and was a lawyer by profession. He was active in several sports, including rugby union (which he played rather than football in his teenage years), tennis and golf.

== Honours ==
Dumbarton

- Scottish Cup: Runners Up 1886–87
- 2 caps for Scotland in 1887, scoring one goal;
- 1 representative cap for Dumbartonshire in 1886, scoring 2 goals
- 1 international trial match for Scotland in 1887.
