= James Allan (footballer, born 1866) =

Scottish footballer

Personal information
- Date of birth: 17 June 1866
- Place of birth: Kilwinning, Scotland
- Date of death: 4 November 1945 (aged 79)
- Place of death: Kilwinning, Scotland
- Position: Centre forward

Youth career
- Kilwinning

Senior career*
Years	Team	Apps	(Gls)
- Queen's Park

International career
1887	Scotland	2	(2)
- * Club domestic league appearances and goals

James Allan (17 June 1866 – 4 November 1945) was a Scottish footballer, who played for Queen's Park and Scotland.
