= William Johnstone (footballer) =

Scottish footballer

Personal information
- Full name: William Johnstone
- Date of birth: 4 November 1864
- Place of birth: Glasgow, Scotland
- Date of death: 11 December 1950 (aged 86)
- Place of death: Milngavie, Scotland
- Position: Forward

Youth career
- Govanhill

Senior career*
| Years | Team | Apps | (Gls) |
| 1884–1894 | Third Lanark | 44 | (14) |

International career
| 1887–1890 | Scotland | 3 | (1) |
- * Club domestic league appearances and goals

William Johnstone (4 November 1864 – 11 December 1950) was a Scottish footballer who played as a forward for Third Lanark and Scotland. A versatile player, he is recorded as having featured on the left wing, in the centre and at inside forward for club and country.
