= Harry Goodhart =

English footballer and professor

Personal information
- Full name: Harry Chester Goodhart
- Date of birth: 17 July 1858
- Place of birth: Wimbledon, London, England
- Date of death: 21 April 1895 (aged 36)
- Place of death: Edinburgh, Scotland
- Position: Centre-forward

Youth career
- 1877: Eton College

Senior career*
Years	Team	Apps	(Gls)
1877–1881	Cambridge University	0	(0)
1878–1885	Old Etonians	0	(0)
	Corinthian	0	(0)

International career
1883	England	3	(0)
- * Club domestic league appearances and goals

Harry Chester Goodhart (17 July 1858 – 21 April 1895) was an English amateur footballer who played as a forward in four FA Cup Finals for Old Etonians, before going on to become Professor of Humanity at the University of Edinburgh

== Early life and education ==
Goodhart was born in Wimbledon, the son of Charles Woide Goodhart (1829–1914), and educated at Eton College. He played for the college football team in 1877 and also represented the college in cricket. He made his first cricket appearance for the college in June 1876 and played throughout that summer and the following. His finest spell came in July 1876 when he scored 55 against I Zingari and 51 against Harrow School in consecutive matches.

During his time at Eton, Goodhart was a friend of James Kenneth Stephen (1859–1892) who became a poet. Goodhart is referred to as "one of them's wed" in the last verse of Stephen's poem, "The Old School List":

There were two good fellows I used to know.

--How distant it all appears!
We played together in football weather,
And messed together for years:
Now one of them's wed, and the other's dead
So long that he's hardly missed
Save by us, who messed with him years ago:

But we're all in the old School List.

In 1877, he went up to Trinity College, Cambridge where he played football for the university but was not awarded a blue. He graduated in 1881 with a second-class BA in Classics and was awarded his MA in 1884.

== Football career ==
Whilst at Trinity, Goodhart joined the Old Etonians, helping the Old Boys re-establish themselves. Old Etonians had been the losing finalists in the FA Cup in 1875 and 1876, but in 1876–77 and 1877–78 had failed to enter a team. The Old Boys entered the FA Cup for the 1878–79 tournament and in the First Round were drawn against the cup holders, Wanderers, who had won the cup in five out of the seven years since the tournament was inaugurated. Goodhart scored in the first half and by the end of the match, the Old Etonians had won 7–2 in what, at the time, was considered a shock. The Old Boys then had victories over Reading and Minerva before coming up against Darwen in Round 4. Darwen were the first club from the north of England to have any success in the FA Cup, although they caused controversy by signing two professional players, Fergus Suter and James Love. Despite attempts to have them banned from the competition, Darwen travelled to London to play the Old Etonians at the Kennington Oval on 13 February 1879. Goodhart scored a hat-trick in a 5–5 draw; the match was replayed on 8 March which was a 2–2 draw and the old boys eventually prevailed in the second replay a week later with Goodhart scoring twice in a 6–2 victory.

The semi-final against Nottingham Forest came the following Saturday (won 2–1) putting the Old Etonians into the final, to be played against Clapham Rovers a week later. Although Clapham dominated the early stages of the final, with Norman Bailey having two attempts on target, Herbert Whitfeld continued to run at the Clapham defenders with little assistance from his colleagues. After a goalless first-half, the only goal of the game came after 59 minutes, when Charles Clerke scored from close range following a run from Goodhart. The old Etonians thus claimed the cup for the first time in what was considered to be "the poorest FA Cup Final to date".

In the following year, Goodhart scored twice in the FA Cup third round 3–1 victory over Wanderers followed by a hat-trick against West End before Clapham Rovers gained their revenge, defeating the Old Etonians 1–0 in the Fifth Round. The Old Boys reached the final again in 1881, with Goodhart scoring a hat-trick in the 10–0 victory over Brentwood in the First Round. The final was played at the Kennington Oval against the Old Carthusians on 9 April 1881; this was the Old Carthusians first appearance in the final and the Old Etonians, on their fourth appearance, were expected to win comfortably. In the event, the Old Carthusians won convincingly, with goals from Edward Wynyard, Edward Parry, and Alexander Tod.

The Old Boys reached their third FA Cup Final in four years in 1882, with Goodhart again scoring a hat-trick in the 5–0 semi-final victory over Marlow. In the final, played at Kennington Oval on 25 March 1882, the Old Boys met Blackburn Rovers, who were the first team from outside London and the Home counties to appear in an FA Cup Final. Blackburn included England internationals, Fred Hargreaves, John Hargreaves and Jimmy Brown as well as Fergus Suter, who had been signed from Darwen. The Old Boys dominated the early stages of the match but Rovers defended well until, according to the match report in Gibbons' "Association Football in Victorian England", "following an expert through ball by Dunn, Macaulay steered the ball between the Blackburn goalposts to secure a well-deserved half-time lead". The Old Etonians were able to prevent Blackburn from scoring in the second half, thus claiming the cup for the second time in three years.

Goodhart, and Old Etonians, made the last appearance in an FA Cup Final in 1883, when they again came up against another side from Blackburn, in the shape of Rovers' rivals, Blackburn Olympic. Although the Old Boys were again favourites to win, their opponents were well-coached by former England player Jack Hunter. Against the run of play in a very physical game, the Etonians took the lead in the final when Goodhart scored during the first half; however Arthur Matthews equalised for Olympic in the second half. Soon afterwards, Arthur Dunn was injured and forced to leave the field, reducing the Etonians to ten men for the rest of the match. The scores remained level at the end of the normal ninety minutes. During the extra period, Olympic's superior stamina began to show. Around twenty minutes into extra time, Jimmy Costley received a pass from John Yates and kicked the ball past Etonian goalkeeper John Rawlinson to score the winning goal.

Goodhart's form with the Old Etonians led to him being selected for the 1883 international matches; these took place in February and March, during the latter stages of the FA Cup. His debut came against Wales on 3 February; the England selectors had chosen an attacking side in the hope of avenging defeats by Wales in each of the two previous years. England won the match comfortably, 5–0 (with a hat-trick from Clement Mitchell). Goodhart retained his place for the match against Ireland three weeks later which was won 7–0 and for the Scotland match on 10 March, which was won by the Scots 3–2. In all three international matches, Goodhart was accompanied by his Old Etonians colleague, Percy de Paravicini, who played at full-back.

In 1883–84, Old Etonians were eliminated from the FA Cup by Hendon in the First round. The following season, Goodhart scored a hat-trick in the 5–2 victory over Middlesbrough in the Fourth Round, before the Old Boys were defeated by Nottingham Forest in the next round. Although the Old Etonians were to enter the FA Cup for the next three seasons, they never again progressed beyond the Fourth Round before withdrawing completely in 1888.

Goodhart was a member of the Corinthian club, but never made any appearances for them in first-team matches, as well as Runnymede football club, and appeared in representative matches for London and The South v The North.

== Academic career ==
In April 1881, Goodhart graduated from Cambridge University, and was the Senior Chancellor's Classical Medallist. He was placed second in the Cambridge Classical Tripos list behind Frederick Brooke Westcott whose father, Brooke Foss Westcott, had achieved similar distinction in 1848. In October, he was elected a Fellow of Trinity College.

He returned to Cambridge in 1884 as a lecturer before joining the University of Edinburgh as Professor of Humanity (the historic term in Scottish Universities for Latin) in 1890, where he remained until his death, after six weeks' illness with pneumonia in 1895, aged 36. He was buried at Lower Beeding, near Horsham, Sussex.

Following his death, his former colleagues at Trinity College sought permission to erect a permanent memorial to him; this was declined by the college authorities, but his friends went ahead and erected a bust, described as a "rather fey memorial". The memorial is still in place above the entrance to staircase I in Nevile's Court.

== Family ==
Goodhart was married in 1886 to Rose Ellen Rendel, the eldest daughter of Lord Rendel (1834–1913), a civil engineer and barrister. His best man at the wedding was the Duke of Clarence, to whom the five years' older Goodhart had been a tutor. Their only child, Harry Stuart Goodhart, was born in 1887.

Following his father's death in 1895, Harry Stuart Goodhart moved to Wonersh in Surrey with his mother and later changed his name to "Harry Stuart Goodhart-Rendel", going on to become a celebrated architect.

In February 1902, Goodhart's widow Rose remarried to Wilbraham Villiers Cooper of Chinthurst Hill, near Guildford. That same year, the altar rails in St. John the Baptist Church, Wonersh were dedicated to Goodhart's memory by his widow; they bear the inscription: "A.D.M.G. In memory of Harry Chester Goodhart Born 1859 [sic] Died 1895 These rails were given in 1902 by his widow".

== Footballing honours ==
Old Etonians

- FA Cup winners: 1879, 1882
  - Runners-up: 1881, 1883
