= William Page (footballer) =

English footballer

Personal information
- Full name: William Robert Page
- Date of birth: 12 December 1858
- Place of birth: London
- Date of death: 1 July 1884 (aged 25)
- Place of death: London
- Position: Centre-forward

Senior career*
Years	Team	Apps	(Gls)
1877–79	Oxford University		
1879–83	Old Carthusians		
- * Club domestic league appearances and goals

William Robert Page (12 December 1858 - 1 July 1884) was an association footballer who won the FA Cup as a player for Old Carthusians.

== Early life ==
Page was the son of William Emmanuel Page, a doctor at St George's Hospital in London, and Julia Catherine (née Keate). He attended Charterhouse School and showed an aptitude for football, his first appearance of note being for the "twenty-two" against the "eleven" in an inter-school match in 1873, under the captaincy of his future Cup-winning team-mate Alexander Tod. In 1876–77 he became captain of the school's first side; he led the school side to a 1–1 draw with the Old Carthusians in November 1876.

== Football career ==
On leaving school he went up to Queen's College, Oxford, and represented the University twice in the Varsity Match, in 1878 and 1879, thus earning his Blue. However he was on the losing side both times.

He also made his FA Cup debut for the University in the 1877–78 competition, scoring twice in a 5–2 first round win over Hertfordshire Rangers. He was one of six first-choice players forced to miss the second replay against the Royal Engineers at the last-six stage, and a weaker University side bowed out of the competition.

He made a splash in the University's first round tie in the 1878–79 FA Cup, scoring four times in a 7–0 romp over Wednesbury Strollers, but for the 1879–80 FA Cup he pledged his loyalty to the Old Carthusians, which had now decided to enter the competition, and scored the club's first goal in the competition in a 4–0 first-round win over Acton.

Page played in three of the ties in the 1880–81 FA Cup, including the final, against the Old Etonians. He had a hand in at least one of the three goals which won the Cup for his side, the second goal coming from Edward Hagarty Parry after Etonian goalkeeper Rawlinson could only parry a Page shot; he may also have provided the pass to Tod for the third goal, although some reports credit Richards with the "assist".

Page's last appearances in the competition came in 1882–83, with him scoring in every round until the semi-final. Along with three other regulars, he was unable to travel to Whalley Range for the match against Blackburn Olympic, and the O.C.s went down 4–0.

Page was particularly unlucky never to earn his England cap, as he was made a reserve five times between 1877 and 1882.

== Later life ==
In 1884, he joined the Royal Irish Constabulary, which limited his association football possibilities. Page died on a visit to London, at 27 Westbourne Park, on 1 July 1884, and was buried in Brompton Cemetery.

== Honours ==
Old Carthusians

- FA Cup winner: 1881
