= Leonard Gillett =

English footballer

Personal information
- Full name: Leonard Francis Gillett
- Date of birth: 21 January 1861
- Place of birth: Borrowash, Derbyshire
- Date of death: 23 November 1915 (aged 54)
- Place of death: Harbertonford, Devon
- Position: Goalkeeper

Senior career*
Years	Team	Apps	(Gls)
1879–82	Old Carthusians		
1882	Oxford University		
1882–83	Notts County		
1883–84	Ockbrook & Borrowash		
1884	Derby County		
- * Club domestic league appearances and goals

Leonard Francis Gillett (21 January 1861 – 23 November 1915) was an English football goalkeeper. He won the FA Cup in 1881 playing for the Old Carthusians.

== Family and early life ==
Gillett was born in Borrowash in Derbyshire and was the son of Francis Gillett, described as a "gentleman".

He was educated at Charterhouse School between 1874 and 1879, playing in goal for the school's first XI in his last year, and matriculated at Pembroke College, Oxford in 1879, graduating in 1882.

== Football career ==
Gillett was goalkeeper in the Old Carthusians' first-ever FA Cup tie in 1879–80, an easy 4–0 win at Acton. The O.C.s were unlucky to be drawn to meet Wanderers in the second round, who, although past their peak, were still potent, and Wace forced the only goal of the game out of a scrimmage.

Gillett missed the first two rounds in the 1880–81 FA Cup, but played in the side's win at the Royal Engineers in the fourth round (the Carthusians having had a bye), and played in all the remaining rounds, including the final, keeping a clean sheet in a 3–0 win over the Old Etonians. His main contribution being a difficult save from a fierce shot by William Anderson.

The Carthusians' defence the following season however did not feature Gillett at all; the first two rounds were easy enough affairs, but Gillett was unavailable for the third round fixture with the Royal Engineers, and, with a much weaker than normal side, the O.C.s went out.

He received his Oxford blue through playing in goal in the 1882 Varsity Match, keeping a clean sheet in a 3–0 win. Carthusians' team-mate Thomas French was one of his team-mates in the match.

In 1882, his work took him back home to Derbyshire, and he originally joined Notts County as goalkeeper, playing in County's fourth round FA Cup win at Sheffield Wednesday, and in front of 10,000 for County's 4–3 win over Aston Villa in the quarter-final, County surviving a protest from Villa as to a late handball as Gillett asserted that he had saved the shot himself. County lost in the semi-final to the Old Etonians, not helped by a late change as Moore had been taken ill just before the game.

He does not seem to have played first-rank football in 1883–84, the only fixtures recorded for him being for the Ockbrook & Borrowash club, playing as back rather than in goal. Before the 1884–85 season, he joined the new Derby County club as goalkeeper. He played in Derby's first match, against Great Lever in September 1884, although he conceded six times, and then conceded 7 to Walsall Town in the first round of the 1884–85 FA Cup. With professionalism rising and the game evidently having passed him by, he did not play senior football again.

== Post-football life ==
Gillett became a mining engineer, and married Edith in Bedford in 1887; the couple had two sons. He died on 23 November 1915 in Devon, leaving an estate of nearly £15,000.
