= List of FA Cup finals =

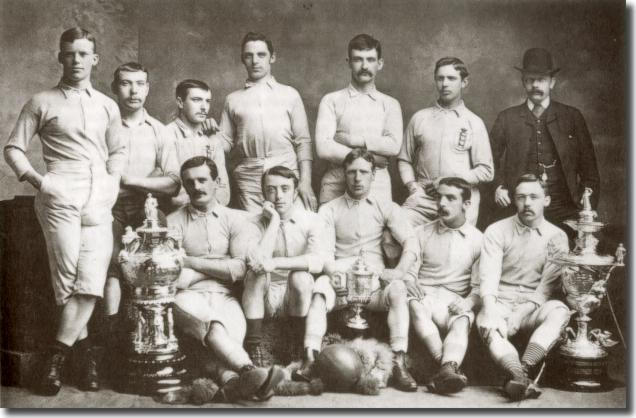
The Blackburn Rovers team which won the FA Cup in 1884. Team captain James Brown (front row, centre) holds the trophy.

The Football Association Challenge Cup, commonly known as the FA Cup, is a knockout competition in English football, organised by and named after The Football Association (the FA), the governing body of the sport in England. It is the oldest existing football competition in the world, having commenced in the 1871–72 season. The tournament is open to all clubs in the top 10 levels of the English football league system, although a club's home stadium must meet certain requirements prior to entering the tournament. The competition culminates at the end of the league season (usually in May) with the FA Cup final, officially named The Football Association Challenge Cup Final Tie, which has traditionally been regarded as the showpiece finale of the English football season.

The vast majority of FA Cup final matches have been in London: most of these were played at the original Wembley Stadium, which was used from 1923 until the stadium closed in 2000. The other venues used for the final before 1923 were Kennington Oval, Crystal Palace, Stamford Bridge and Lillie Bridge, all in London, Goodison Park in Liverpool and Fallowfield Stadium and Old Trafford in Manchester. The Millennium Stadium in Cardiff hosted the final for six years (2001–2006), while the new Wembley Stadium was under construction. Other grounds have been used for replays, which until 1999 took place if the initial match ended in a draw. The new Wembley Stadium has been the permanent venue of the final since 2007.

As of 2026, 45 clubs have won the FA Cup. The record for the most wins is held by Arsenal, with 14 victories. Only one surviving club, Blackburn Rovers, have won the cup in three consecutive years, a feat that was also achieved by the now dissolved Wanderers; Chelsea are the only team to have lost three consecutive FA Cup finals. The cup has been won by the same team in two or more consecutive years on ten occasions, and four teams have won consecutive finals more than once: Wanderers, Blackburn Rovers, Tottenham Hotspur and Arsenal. The cup has been won by a non-English team once: Cardiff City in 1927. The current holders are Manchester City, who defeated Chelsea in the 2026 final for their eighth win, having become the first team to qualify for four consecutive FA Cup finals.

== History ==
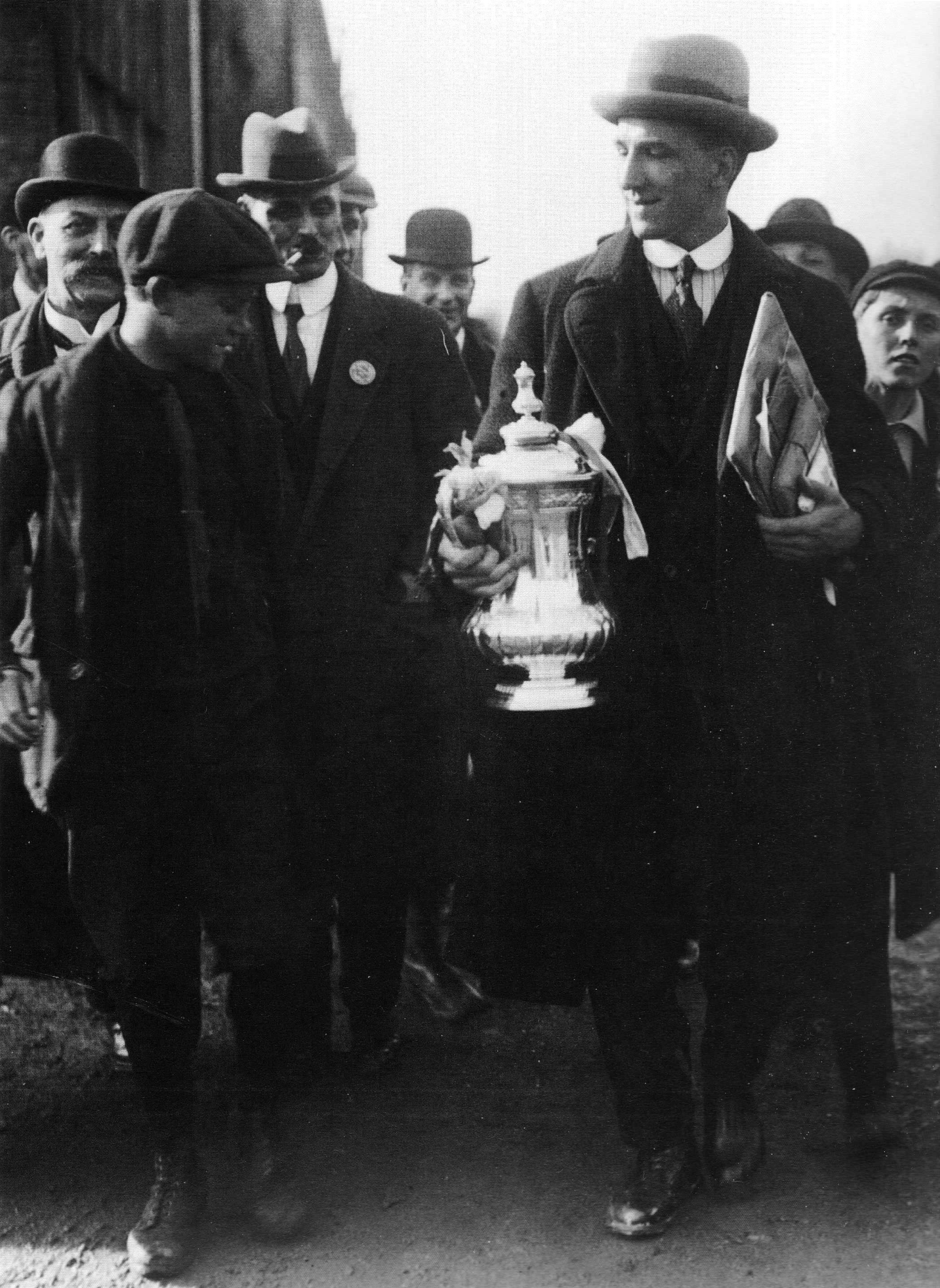
Tottenham Hotspur captain Arthur Grimsdell displays the cup to fans on the Tottenham High Road after Spurs' victory in the 1921 final, the first win by a London-based team since the same club's win 20 years earlier.

The winners of the first tournament were Wanderers, a team of former public schoolboys based in London, who went on to win the competition five times in its first seven seasons. The early winners of the competition were all teams of wealthy amateurs from the south of England, but in 1883, Blackburn Olympic became the first team from the north to win the cup, defeating Old Etonians. Upon his team's return to Blackburn, Olympic captain Albert Warburton proclaimed: "The Cup is very welcome to Lancashire. It'll have a good home and it'll never go back to London".

With the advent of professionalism at around the same time, the amateur teams quickly faded from prominence in the competition. The leading professional clubs formed The Football League in 1888. Since then, one non-league team has won the cup. Tottenham Hotspur, then of the Southern League, defeated Sheffield United of The Football League to win the 1901 final. A year later Sheffield United returned to the final and won the cup, which then remained in the hands of Northern and Midland clubs until Tottenham won it again in 1921. In 1927, Cardiff City, a team which plays in the English football league system despite being based in Wales, won the cup, the only non-English club to do so. Scottish club Queen's Park reached the final twice in the early years of the competition.

The competition was not held during the First and Second World Wars, except in the 1914–15 season, when it was completed, and the 1939–40 season, when it was abandoned during the qualifying rounds.

Newcastle United enjoyed a brief spell of FA Cup dominance in the 1950s, winning the trophy three times in five years, and in the 1960s, Tottenham Hotspur enjoyed a similar spell of success, with three wins in seven seasons. This marked the start of a successful period for London-based clubs, with 11 wins in 22 seasons. Teams from the second tier of English football, at the time called the Second Division, experienced an unprecedented run of cup success between 1973 and 1980. Sunderland won the cup in 1973, Southampton repeated the feat in 1976, and West Ham United won in 1980, the most recent victory by a team from outside the top division.

Until 1999, a draw in the final would result in the match being replayed at a later date; since then the final has always been decided on the day, with a penalty shoot-out as required. As of 2022 a penalty shoot-out has been required on only three occasions, in the 2005, 2006 and 2022 finals. Arsenal hold the record for the highest number of FA Cup wins, having claimed the trophy 14 times, most recently in 2020.

== Results ==
Key to list of winners
(R)	Replay
*	Match went to extra time
†	Match decided via a penalty shoot-out after extra time
‡	Winning team won the Double (League title and FA Cup)
§	Winning team won the Domestic Treble (League title, FA Cup and League Cup)
#	Winning team won the Continental Treble (League title, FA Cup and European Cup/Champions League)
Italics	Team from outside the top tier of English league football (since the formation of The Football League in 1888)
(#)	Number of trophy won by club

- The "Season" column refers to the season the competition was held, and wikilinks to the article about that season.
- The wikilinks in the "Score" column point to the article about that season's final game.

All teams are English, except where marked (Scotland) (Scottish) or (Wales) (Wales) (Welsh).

FA Cup finals
Season	Winners	Score	Runners-up	Venue	Attendance
1871–72	Wanderers (1)	1–0	Royal Engineers	Kennington Oval	2,000
1872–73	Wanderers (2)	2–0	Oxford University	Lillie Bridge	3,000
1873–74	Oxford University (1)	2–0	Royal Engineers	Kennington Oval	2,000
1874–75	Royal Engineers (1)	1–1 *	Old Etonians	Kennington Oval	2,000
1874–75	Royal Engineers (1)	2–0 (R)	Old Etonians	Kennington Oval	3,000
1875–76	Wanderers (3)	1–1	Old Etonians	Kennington Oval	3,500
1875–76	Wanderers (3)	3–0 (R)	Old Etonians	Kennington Oval	1,500
1876–77	Wanderers (4)	2–1 *	Oxford University	Kennington Oval	3,000
1877–78	Wanderers (5)	3–1	Royal Engineers	Kennington Oval	4,500
1878–79	Old Etonians (1)	1–0	Clapham Rovers	Kennington Oval	5,000
1879–80	Clapham Rovers (1)	1–0	Oxford University	Kennington Oval	6,000
1880–81	Old Carthusians (1)	3–0	Old Etonians	Kennington Oval	4,000
1881–82	Old Etonians (2)	1–0	Blackburn Rovers	Kennington Oval	6,500
1882–83	Blackburn Olympic (1)	2–1 *	Old Etonians	Kennington Oval	8,000
1883–84	Blackburn Rovers (1)	2–1	(Scotland) Queen's Park	Kennington Oval	4,000
1884–85	Blackburn Rovers (2)	2–0	(Scotland) Queen's Park	Kennington Oval	12,500
1885–86	Blackburn Rovers (3)	0–0	West Bromwich Albion	Kennington Oval	15,000
1885–86	Blackburn Rovers (3)	2–0 (R)	West Bromwich Albion	Racecourse Ground	12,000
1886–87	Aston Villa (1)	2–0	West Bromwich Albion	Kennington Oval	15,500
1887–88	West Bromwich Albion (1)	2–1	Preston North End	Kennington Oval	19,000
1888–89	Preston North End ‡ (1)	3–0	Wolverhampton Wanderers	Kennington Oval	22,000
1889–90	Blackburn Rovers (4)	6–1	The Wednesday	Kennington Oval	20,000
1890–91	Blackburn Rovers (5)	3–1	Notts County	Kennington Oval	23,000
1891–92	West Bromwich Albion (2)	3–0	Aston Villa	Kennington Oval	32,810
1892–93	Wolverhampton Wanderers (1)	1–0	Everton	Fallowfield Stadium	45,000
1893–94	Notts County (1)	4–1	Bolton Wanderers	Goodison Park	37,000
1894–95	Aston Villa (2)	1–0	West Bromwich Albion	Crystal Palace	42,560
1895–96	The Wednesday (1)	2–1	Wolverhampton Wanderers	Crystal Palace	48,836
1896–97	Aston Villa ‡ (3)	3–2	Everton	Crystal Palace	65,891
1897–98	Nottingham Forest (1)	3–1	Derby County	Crystal Palace	62,017
1898–99	Sheffield United (1)	4–1	Derby County	Crystal Palace	73,833
1899–1900	Bury (1)	4–0	Southampton	Crystal Palace	68,945
1900–01	Tottenham Hotspur (1)	2–2	Sheffield United	Crystal Palace	110,820
1900–01	Tottenham Hotspur (1)	3–1 (R)	Sheffield United	Burnden Park	20,470
1901–02	Sheffield United (2)	1–1	Southampton	Crystal Palace	76,914
1901–02	Sheffield United (2)	2–1 (R)	Southampton	Crystal Palace	33,068
1902–03	Bury (2)	6–0	Derby County	Crystal Palace	63,102
1903–04	Manchester City (1)	1–0	Bolton Wanderers	Crystal Palace	61,374
1904–05	Aston Villa (4)	2–0	Newcastle United	Crystal Palace	101,117
1905–06	Everton (1)	1–0	Newcastle United	Crystal Palace	75,609
1906–07	The Wednesday (2)	2–1	Everton	Crystal Palace	84,594
1907–08	Wolverhampton Wanderers (2)	3–1	Newcastle United	Crystal Palace	74,697
1908–09	Manchester United (1)	1–0	Bristol City	Crystal Palace	71,401
1909–10	Newcastle United (1)	1–1	Barnsley	Crystal Palace	77,747
1909–10	Newcastle United (1)	2–0 (R)	Barnsley	Goodison Park	69,000
1910–11	Bradford City (1)	0–0	Newcastle United	Crystal Palace	69,068
1910–11	Bradford City (1)	1–0 (R)	Newcastle United	Old Trafford	58,000
1911–12	Barnsley (1)	0–0	West Bromwich Albion	Crystal Palace	54,556
1911–12	Barnsley (1)	1–0 * (R)	West Bromwich Albion	Bramall Lane	38,555
1912–13	Aston Villa (5)	1–0	Sunderland	Crystal Palace	121,919
1913–14	Burnley (1)	1–0	Liverpool	Crystal Palace	72,778
1914–15	Sheffield United (3)	3–0	Chelsea	Old Trafford	49,557
1919–20	Aston Villa (6)	1–0 *	Huddersfield Town	Stamford Bridge	50,018
1920–21	Tottenham Hotspur (2)	1–0	Wolverhampton Wanderers	Stamford Bridge	72,805
1921–22	Huddersfield Town (1)	1–0	Preston North End	Stamford Bridge	53,000
1922–23	Bolton Wanderers (1)	2–0	West Ham United	Wembley Stadium (original)	126,047 (Note: The official attendance for the 1923 final was reported as 126,047, but the actual figure is believed to be anywhere between 150,000 and 300,000.)
1923–24	Newcastle United (2)	2–0	Aston Villa	Wembley Stadium (original)	91,695
1924–25	Sheffield United (4)	1–0	(Wales) Cardiff City	Wembley Stadium (original)	91,763
1925–26	Bolton Wanderers (2)	1–0	Manchester City	Wembley Stadium (original)	91,447
1926–27	(Wales) Cardiff City (1)	1–0	Arsenal	Wembley Stadium (original)	91,206
1927–28	Blackburn Rovers (6)	3–1	Huddersfield Town	Wembley Stadium (original)	92,041
1928–29	Bolton Wanderers (3)	2–0	Portsmouth	Wembley Stadium (original)	92,576
1929–30	Arsenal (1)	2–0	Huddersfield Town	Wembley Stadium (original)	92,488
1930–31	West Bromwich Albion (3)	2–1	Birmingham	Wembley Stadium (original)	92,406
1931–32	Newcastle United (3)	2–1	Arsenal	Wembley Stadium (original)	92,298
1932–33	Everton (2)	3–0	Manchester City	Wembley Stadium (original)	92,950
1933–34	Manchester City (2)	2–1	Portsmouth	Wembley Stadium (original)	93,258
1934–35	Sheffield Wednesday (3)	4–2	West Bromwich Albion	Wembley Stadium (original)	93,204
1935–36	Arsenal (2)	1–0	Sheffield United	Wembley Stadium (original)	93,384
1936–37	Sunderland (1)	3–1	Preston North End	Wembley Stadium (original)	93,495
1937–38	Preston North End (2)	1–0 *	Huddersfield Town	Wembley Stadium (original)	93,497
1938–39	Portsmouth (1)	4–1	Wolverhampton Wanderers	Wembley Stadium (original)	99,370
1945–46	Derby County (1)	4–1 *	Charlton Athletic	Wembley Stadium (original)	98,000
1946–47	Charlton Athletic (1)	1–0 *	Burnley	Wembley Stadium (original)	99,000
1947–48	Manchester United (2)	4–2	Blackpool	Wembley Stadium (original)	99,000
1948–49	Wolverhampton Wanderers (3)	3–1	Leicester City	Wembley Stadium (original)	99,000
1949–50	Arsenal (3)	2–0	Liverpool	Wembley Stadium (original)	100,000
1950–51	Newcastle United (4)	2–0	Blackpool	Wembley Stadium (original)	100,000
1951–52	Newcastle United (5)	1–0	Arsenal	Wembley Stadium (original)	100,000
1952–53	Blackpool (1)	4–3	Bolton Wanderers	Wembley Stadium (original)	100,000
1953–54	West Bromwich Albion (4)	3–2	Preston North End	Wembley Stadium (original)	100,000
1954–55	Newcastle United (6)	3–1	Manchester City	Wembley Stadium (original)	100,000
1955–56	Manchester City (3)	3–1	Birmingham City	Wembley Stadium (original)	100,000
1956–57	Aston Villa (7)	2–1	Manchester United	Wembley Stadium (original)	100,000
1957–58	Bolton Wanderers (4)	2–0	Manchester United	Wembley Stadium (original)	100,000
1958–59	Nottingham Forest (2)	2–1	Luton Town	Wembley Stadium (original)	100,000
1959–60	Wolverhampton Wanderers (4)	3–0	Blackburn Rovers	Wembley Stadium (original)	100,000
1960–61	Tottenham Hotspur ‡ (3)	2–0	Leicester City	Wembley Stadium (original)	100,000
1961–62	Tottenham Hotspur (4)	3–1	Burnley	Wembley Stadium (original)	100,000
1962–63	Manchester United (3)	3–1	Leicester City	Wembley Stadium (original)	100,000
1963–64	West Ham United (1)	3–2	Preston North End	Wembley Stadium (original)	100,000
1964–65	Liverpool (1)	2–1 *	Leeds United	Wembley Stadium (original)	100,000
1965–66	Everton (3)	3–2	Sheffield Wednesday	Wembley Stadium (original)	100,000
1966–67	Tottenham Hotspur (5)	2–1	Chelsea	Wembley Stadium (original)	100,000
1967–68	West Bromwich Albion (5)	1–0 *	Everton	Wembley Stadium (original)	100,000
1968–69	Manchester City (4)	1–0	Leicester City	Wembley Stadium (original)	100,000
1969–70	Chelsea (1)	2–2 *	Leeds United	Wembley Stadium (original)	100,000
1969–70	Chelsea (1)	2–1 * (R)	Leeds United	Old Trafford	62,078
1970–71	Arsenal ‡ (4)	2–1 *	Liverpool	Wembley Stadium (original)	100,000
1971–72	Leeds United (1)	1–0	Arsenal	Wembley Stadium (original)	100,000
1972–73	Sunderland (2)	1–0	Leeds United	Wembley Stadium (original)	100,000
1973–74	Liverpool (2)	3–0	Newcastle United	Wembley Stadium (original)	100,000
1974–75	West Ham United (2)	2–0	Fulham	Wembley Stadium (original)	100,000
1975–76	Southampton (1)	1–0	Manchester United	Wembley Stadium (original)	100,000
1976–77	Manchester United (4)	2–1	Liverpool	Wembley Stadium (original)	100,000
1977–78	Ipswich Town (1)	1–0	Arsenal	Wembley Stadium (original)	100,000
1978–79	Arsenal (5)	3–2	Manchester United	Wembley Stadium (original)	100,000
1979–80	West Ham United (3)	1–0	Arsenal	Wembley Stadium (original)	100,000
1980–81	Tottenham Hotspur (6)	1–1 *	Manchester City	Wembley Stadium (original)	100,000
1980–81	Tottenham Hotspur (6)	3–2 (R)	Manchester City	Wembley Stadium (original)	92,000
1981–82	Tottenham Hotspur (7)	1–1 *	Queens Park Rangers	Wembley Stadium (original)	100,000
1981–82	Tottenham Hotspur (7)	1–0 (R)	Queens Park Rangers	Wembley Stadium (original)	90,000
1982–83	Manchester United (5)	2–2 *	Brighton & Hove Albion	Wembley Stadium (original)	100,000
1982–83	Manchester United (5)	4–0 (R)	Brighton & Hove Albion	Wembley Stadium (original)	100,000
1983–84	Everton (4)	2–0	Watford	Wembley Stadium (original)	100,000
1984–85	Manchester United (6)	1–0 *	Everton	Wembley Stadium (original)	100,000
1985–86	Liverpool ‡ (3)	3–1	Everton	Wembley Stadium (original)	98,000
1986–87	Coventry City (1)	3–2 *	Tottenham Hotspur	Wembley Stadium (original)	98,000
1987–88	Wimbledon (1)	1–0	Liverpool	Wembley Stadium (original)	98,203
1988–89	Liverpool (4)	3–2 *	Everton	Wembley Stadium (original)	82,500
1989–90	Manchester United (7)	3–3 *	Crystal Palace	Wembley Stadium (original)	80,000
1989–90	Manchester United (7)	1–0 (R)	Crystal Palace	Wembley Stadium (original)	80,000
1990–91	Tottenham Hotspur (8)	2–1 *	Nottingham Forest	Wembley Stadium (original)	80,000
1991–92	Liverpool (5)	2–0	Sunderland	Wembley Stadium (original)	80,000
1992–93	Arsenal (6)	1–1 *	Sheffield Wednesday	Wembley Stadium (original)	79,347
1992–93	Arsenal (6)	2–1 * (R)	Sheffield Wednesday	Wembley Stadium (original)	62,267
1993–94	Manchester United ‡ (8)	4–0	Chelsea	Wembley Stadium (original)	79,634
1994–95	Everton (5)	1–0	Manchester United	Wembley Stadium (original)	79,592
1995–96	Manchester United ‡ (9)	1–0	Liverpool	Wembley Stadium (original)	79,007
1996–97	Chelsea (2)	2–0	Middlesbrough	Wembley Stadium (original)	79,160
1997–98	Arsenal ‡ (7)	2–0	Newcastle United	Wembley Stadium (original)	79,183
1998–99	Manchester United # (10)	2–0	Newcastle United	Wembley Stadium (original)	79,101
1999–2000	Chelsea (3)	1–0	Aston Villa	Wembley Stadium (original)	78,217
2000–01	Liverpool (6)	2–1	Arsenal	Millennium Stadium	72,500
2001–02	Arsenal ‡ (8)	2–0	Chelsea	Millennium Stadium	73,963
2002–03	Arsenal (9)	1–0	Southampton	Millennium Stadium	73,726
2003–04	Manchester United (11)	3–0	Millwall	Millennium Stadium	71,350
2004–05	Arsenal (10)	0–0 † (Note: Score was 0–0 after extra time. Arsenal won the penalty shoot-out 5–4.)	Manchester United	Millennium Stadium	71,876
2005–06	Liverpool (7)	3–3 † (Note: Score was 3–3 after 90 minutes and extra time. Liverpool won the penalty shoot-out 3–1.)	West Ham United	Millennium Stadium	71,140
2006–07	Chelsea (4)	1–0 *	Manchester United	Wembley Stadium	89,826
2007–08	Portsmouth (2)	1–0	(Wales) Cardiff City	Wembley Stadium	89,874
2008–09	Chelsea (5)	2–1	Everton	Wembley Stadium	89,391
2009–10	Chelsea ‡ (6)	1–0	Portsmouth	Wembley Stadium	88,335
2010–11	Manchester City (5)	1–0	Stoke City	Wembley Stadium	88,643
2011–12	Chelsea (7)	2–1	Liverpool	Wembley Stadium	89,041
2012–13	Wigan Athletic (1)	1–0	Manchester City	Wembley Stadium	86,254
2013–14	Arsenal (11)	3–2 *	Hull City	Wembley Stadium	89,345
2014–15	Arsenal (12)	4–0	Aston Villa	Wembley Stadium	89,283
2015–16	Manchester United (12)	2–1 *	Crystal Palace	Wembley Stadium	88,619
2016–17	Arsenal (13)	2–1	Chelsea	Wembley Stadium	89,472
2017–18	Chelsea (8)	1–0	Manchester United	Wembley Stadium	87,647
2018–19	Manchester City § (6)	6–0	Watford	Wembley Stadium	85,854
2019–20	Arsenal (14)	2–1	Chelsea	Wembley Stadium	0 (Note: The 2020 final was played behind closed doors due to the COVID-19 pandemic in the United Kingdom.)
2020–21	Leicester City (1)	1–0	Chelsea	Wembley Stadium	20,000 (Note: The 2021 final attendance was capped at 20,000 due to the COVID-19 pandemic in the United Kingdom.)
2021–22	Liverpool (8)	0–0 † (Note: Score was 0–0 after extra time. Liverpool won the penalty shoot-out 6–5.)	Chelsea	Wembley Stadium	84,897
2022–23	Manchester City # (7)	2–1	Manchester United	Wembley Stadium	83,179
2023–24	Manchester United (13)	2–1	Manchester City	Wembley Stadium	84,814
2024–25	Crystal Palace (1)	1–0	Manchester City	Wembley Stadium	84,163
2025–26	Manchester City (8)	1–0	Chelsea	Wembley Stadium	83,337

== Results by team ==
Teams shown in italics are no longer in existence. Additionally, Queen's Park ceased to be eligible to enter the FA Cup after a Scottish Football Association ruling in 1887.

Results by team
Club	Wins	First final won	Last final won	Runners-up	Last final lost	Total final appearances
Arsenal	14	1930	2020	7	2001	21
Manchester United	13	1909	2024	9	2023	22
Chelsea	8	1970	2018	9	2026	17
Liverpool	8	1965	2022	7	2012	15
Manchester City	8	1904	2026	7	2025	15
Tottenham Hotspur	8	1901	1991	1	1987	9
Aston Villa	7	1887	1957	4	2015	11
Newcastle United	6	1910	1955	7	1999	13
Blackburn Rovers	6	1884	1928	2	1960	8
Everton	5	1906	1995	8	2009	13
West Bromwich Albion	5	1888	1968	5	1935	10
Wanderers	5	1872	1878	0	—	5
Wolverhampton Wanderers	4	1893	1960	4	1939	8
Bolton Wanderers	4	1923	1958	3	1953	7
Sheffield United	4	1899	1925	2	1936	6
Sheffield Wednesday (Note: Sheffield Wednesday's total includes two wins and one defeat under the earlier name of The Wednesday.)	3	1896	1935	3	1993	6
West Ham United	3	1964	1980	2	2006	5
Preston North End	2	1889	1938	5	1964	7
Old Etonians	2	1879	1882	4	1883	6
Portsmouth	2	1939	2008	3	2010	5
Sunderland	2	1937	1973	2	1992	4
Nottingham Forest	2	1898	1959	1	1991	3
Bury (Note: Bury have reformed as a phoenix club since their last appearance in the final.)	2	1900	1903	0	—	2
Huddersfield Town	1	1922		4	1938	5
Leicester City	1	2021		4	1969	5
Oxford University	1	1874		3	1880	4
Royal Engineers	1	1875		3	1878	4
Derby County	1	1946		3	1903	4
Leeds United	1	1972		3	1973	4
Southampton	1	1976		3	2003	4
Burnley	1	1914		2	1962	3
Cardiff City	1	1927		2	2008	3
Blackpool	1	1953		2	1951	3
Crystal Palace	1	2025		2	2016	3
Clapham Rovers	1	1880		1	1879	2
Notts County	1	1894		1	1891	2
Barnsley	1	1912		1	1910	2
Charlton Athletic	1	1947		1	1946	2
Old Carthusians	1	1881		0	—	1
Blackburn Olympic	1	1883		0	—	1
Bradford City	1	1911		0	—	1
Ipswich Town	1	1978		0	—	1
Coventry City	1	1987		0	—	1
Wimbledon (Note: Wimbledon relocated from south London to Milton Keynes in 2003 before rebranding as Milton Keynes Dons in 2004, but that entity considers itself to have been founded in the latter year and does not lay claim to the history or honours of Wimbledon, including the FA Cup win; nor does AFC Wimbledon, the phoenix club founded in 2002.)	1	1988		0	—	1
Wigan Athletic	1	2013		0	—	1
Queen's Park	0	—		2	1885	2
Birmingham City (Note: Birmingham City's total includes one defeat under the earlier name of Birmingham.)	0	—		2	1956	2
Watford	0	—		2	2019	2
Bristol City	0	—		1	1909	1
Luton Town	0	—		1	1959	1
Fulham	0	—		1	1975	1
Queens Park Rangers	0	—		1	1982	1
Brighton & Hove Albion	0	—		1	1983	1
Middlesbrough	0	—		1	1997	1
Millwall	0	—		1	2004	1
Stoke City	0	—		1	2011	1
Hull City	0	—		1	2014	1

== Top goalscorers ==
All players with three or more goals

Rank	Player	Nat.	Club	Finals scored in	Total
1	Ian Rush	(Wales)	Liverpool	1986, 1989, 1992	5
2	Didier Drogba	(Ivory Coast)	Chelsea	2007, 2009, 2010, 2012	4
2	Stan Mortensen	(England)	Blackpool	1948, 1953	4
2	William Townley	(England)	Blackburn Rovers	1890, 1891	4
2	Ian Wright	(England)	Crystal Palace, Arsenal	1990, 1993	4
3	Eric Cantona	(France)	Manchester United	1994, 1996	3
3	Mark Hughes	(Wales)	Manchester United	1990, 1994	3
3	Bryan Robson	(England)	Manchester United	1983, 1990	3
3	Nat Lofthouse	(England)	Bolton Wanderers	1953, 1958	3
3	Jackie Milburn	(England)	Newcastle United	1951, 1955	3
3	Jarvis Kenrick	(England)	Wanderers	1887, 1888	3
3	James Logan	(Scotland)	Notts County	1894	3
3	Sandy Brown	(Scotland)	Tottenham Hotspur	1901	3
3	Henry Renny-Tailyour	(Scotland)	Royal Engineers	1875	3

== See also ==
- List of association football competitions
- FA Cup semi-finals
