= Bryan Farrer =

English footballer (1858–1944)

Personal information
- Full name: Bryan Farrer
- Date of birth: 25 November 1858
- Place of birth: Hyde Park, London
- Date of death: 23 April 1944 (aged 85)
- Place of death: Wareham, Dorset
- Position: Midfielder

Senior career*
Years	Team	Apps	(Gls)
1876–77	Eton College		
1880–81	Oxford University		
1880–82	Old Etonians		
1882–84	Clapham Rovers		
1884–86	Old Etonians		
- * Club domestic league appearances and goals

Bryan Farrer (25 November 1858 - 23 April 1944) was an association football right-sided forward who played in the 1881 FA Cup final for the Old Etonians.

== Family and early life ==
Farrer was the third son of Oliver Farrer, of Binnegar Hall, Wareham, Dorset, and went up to Eton College in 1871; one of those admitted at the same time was Cecil Spring-Rice. He had an outstanding sporting career at Eton, playing for College in the XIs for both the Wall and Field sides, holding the office of Keeper of the Field in 1877.

He matriculated at Trinity College, Oxford in 1878, and took a second class degre in Literae Humaniores in 1883.

== Sporting career ==
Farrer represented the college in competitive matches in 1877–78, and made his competitive debut in the 1879–80 FA Cup, as half-back for Oxford University A.F.C., in its second round win over Birmingham. He only played one more Cup match for the university, in the third round win over Maidenhead, He did however play in the 1881 Varsity Match against Cambridge University, but was on the losing side.

For the 1880–81 FA Cup, he pledged his loyalty to the Old Etonians, but only played in two matches before the final. The second was the 2–1 win at Stafford Road which put the Etonians into the final, against the Old Carthusians, and he retained his place for the game at half-back, but was anonymous in a 3–0 defeat.

Farrer's next appearance in the competition was for the Clapham Rovers in the 1882–83 edition, once more against the Old Carthusians, due to a reshuffle that saw regular half-back Bailey put into the forward line, but he was again on the losing side, this time 5–3

He remained with the Rovers until 1885, and then reverted to the Old Etonians, his final recorded match being a 3–0 defeat to the Old Westminsters in the 1886–87 FA Cup third round.

== Professional life ==
Farrer married Mabel Gertrude Smith in South Kensington in December 1892; the couple had three sons. He was called to the Bar in 1884, and became a bencher at Lincoln's Inn. He qualified as a county magistrate in 1924, sitting at Wareham, and was also chairman of the Juvenile Court.

He served as a councillor on the Dorset County Council, for the Wareham Division, from 1928 to 1939, when he stepped down due to ill-health. He was also a member of the Wareham and Purbeck Rural District Council from 1927 to 1941, latterly being vice-chairman. He died at his home at Binnegar Hall. East Stoke, Wareham, on 22 April 1944.
