= Lindsay Bury =

English footballer and cricketer

Personal information
- Full name: Lindsay Bury
- Date of birth: 9 July 1857
- Place of birth: Withington, Lancashire, England
- Date of death: 30 October 1935 (aged 78)
- Place of death: Stanford Dingley, Berkshire, England
- Position: Full-back

Senior career*
Years	Team	Apps	(Gls)
1877–1878	Cambridge University	?	(?)
1879	Old Etonians	?	(?)
?	Swifts	?	(?)

International career
1877–1879	England	2	(0)
- Cricket career
Cricket information
- Batting: Right-handed
- Bowling: Right-arm roundarm fast
Domestic team information
- Years: Team
- 1877–1878: Cambridge University
- 1877: Hampshire
Career statistics
Competition	First-class
Matches	9
Runs scored	115
Batting average	9.58
100s/50s	–/–
Top score	21
Balls bowled	504
Wickets	18
Bowling average	13.83
5 wickets in innings	–
10 wickets in match	–
Best bowling	4/26
Catches/stumpings	4/–
- Source: Lindsay Bury at Cricinfo
- * Club domestic league appearances and goals

Lindsay Bury JP (9 July 1857 — 30 October 1935) was an English sportsman. As an amateur footballer who played as a full back, he helped the Old Etonians win the FA Cup in 1879. In international football, he made two appearances for England in the 1870s. He also played firsy-class cricket for Cambridge University in 1877 and 1878, and Hampshire in 1877.

== Education and cricket ==
The son of Henry Bury, he was born in July 1857 at Withington, Lancashire. He was educated at Eton College, where he played for the college football team in 1875 and 1876. From there, he matriculated to Trinity College, Cambridge, graduating with a Bachelor of Arts in 1880.

At Cambridge, he earned a blue for football in both 1877 and 1878, as well as a blue for cricket in 1877. He was also especially noted for his sprinting and hammer throwing, and won athletics blues in 1878, 1879 and 1880. In cricket, he made his debut in first-class cricket for Cambridge University against an England XI at Fenner's in 1877. He made six further first-class appearances for Cambridge in 1877, including in The University Match against Oxford University at Lord's. Bury also made a single first-class appearance for Hampshire against Derbyshire at Derby in the same season. The following season, he made one first-class appearance for Cambridge against an England XI. In eight first-class matches for Cambridge, he took 17 wickets with his right-arm roundarm fast bowling, at an average of 13.29, with best figures of 4 for 26.

== Football career ==
Bury appeared regularly for the Old Etonians and for Cambridge University. His first England appearance came as left-back on 3 March 1877, when he was still at university. He was one of seven débutantes in the England team to play Scotland at The Oval. According to Philip Gibbons, in the 1870s the England side "tended to be chosen on availability rather than skill alone" The change in the England line-up made little difference to England's performance against the Scots who won the game 3–1, with England's consolation goal coming from Alfred Lyttelton; the Scots thus inflicted England's first international defeat on home soil in the sixth appearance between the two countries.

Along with most of the other international débutantes, he was not selected for the next England match, but he was recalled for the first ever match between England and Wales on 18 January 1879. As Wales had been defeated 9–0 in their previous international against Scotland, England were confident of victory and selected an inexperienced eleven, including five débutantes. The match was played at The Oval in a blizzard. Due to the atrocious snowfall, both captains agreed to play halves of only 30 minutes each. The poor attendance (reports range from 85 to 300) was also attributed to the weather. Some sources suggest that William Clegg turned up 20 minutes late for the game. Clegg, a solicitor, was working late on a case (the trial of Charles Peace, the Banner Cross murderer) and was unable to leave Sheffield for London on the Friday night. The next morning, the southbound train with Clegg on it was delayed by heavy snow. The match started without Clegg and England played with ten men until he arrived. Despite this, England won the match by two goals to one, with Herbert Whitfeld and Thomas Sorby scoring for England.

In 1879, he helped the Old Etonians reach the FA Cup Final where they met Clapham Rovers at The Oval on 29 March. Bury and his team captain, Arthur Kinnaird, were required to call on "their well-known powers ... to keep the enemy out of their quarters". The match was dominated by the defences and was goalless at half-time. In the second half, Charles Clerke scored for the Old Etonians "following an excellent run by Goodhart" and "arguably the poorest Cup Final to date" ended in a 1–0 victory for the Old Etonians.

Bury served on The Football Association committee in 1878, and also played for Swifts F.C. and in representative matches for The South v The North.

== Later life ==
He later emigrated to Florida where he became an orange planter, possibly in association with his former Eton College and Cambridge University compatriot Rupert Anderson who had gone to Florida at the same time. Bury subsequently returned to England, settling near Bradfield, Berkshire. He was active in local politics in later life, sitting as a councillor on Bradfield Council and serving for many years as its chairman. He was a justice of the peace for Wiltshire, having previously been resident in the county at Pewsey. In the First World War he volunteered to serve with the French Red Cross. Bury died suddenly in October 1935 at Stanford Dingley, Berkshire.

== Honours ==
Old Etonians

- FA Cup winners: 1879
