= John Chevallier (born 1857) =

English footballer and businessman

Personal information
- Full name: John Barrington Trapnell Cheavllier
- Date of birth: 10 January 1857
- Place of birth: Aspall, England
- Date of death: 17 February 1940 (aged 83)
- Place of death: Aspall, England
- Position: Centre-forward

Youth career
- Eton College

Senior career*
Years	Team	Apps	(Gls)
1876–1880	Cambridge University		
1879–1885	Old Etonians		
1883–1885	Derby County		
1885–1886	Ipswich Town		
- * Club domestic league appearances and goals

John Barrington Trapnell Chevallier (10 January 1857 – 17 February 1940) was an English amateur footballer who played as a forward for Old Etonians, before taking over the family business, Aspall Cyder.

== Early life and education ==
Chevallier was born in Aspall, Suffolk, the eldest son of Reverend Charles Henry Chevallier and Isabella Frances Cobbold, and won a scholarship to Eton College in 1868. He was the Eton football captain in 1875–76, his most notable appearance being against FA Cup semi-finalists Swifts in December.

In 1876, he went up to King's College, Cambridge, where he played football for the university. He was awarded a f degree in the mathematics tripos in 1880.

== Football career ==
=== Old Etonians ===
In 1878, Chevallier joined the Old Etonians and made his competitive debut for the old boys in the first round of the 1878–79 FA Cup. The Etonians were drawn to play the cup holders, Wanderers, who had won the cup in five out of the seven years since the tournament was inaugurated, but Alfred Kinnaird had by now left the Wanderers for the Old Etonians, and, in a major surprise, the Old Boys won 7–2.

Chevallier scored the only goal in the Etonians' second round win over Reading, and was one of the two centre-forwards in the Etonians XI which beat Clapham Rovers 1–0 in the 1879 FA Cup final.

In February 1880, Chevallier scored a hat-trick for Cambridge University in a 6–1 friendly win over the Rovers. Three weeks later, the Rovers eliminated the Etonians from the Cup, while Chevallier was absent, having played for his university in the 1879–80 FA Cup, where they lost to the Royal Engineers in the first round.

Perhaps because of this defeat, for 1880–81 he pledged his loyalty to the Old Etonians, and was a regular in the Old Boys' runs to the final in 1880–81 and 1881–82, playing anywhere along the forward line; he picked up a runners-up medal in 1881 and a winners' medal in 1882 playing on the right side. His only goal in the competition in those runs came against Herts Rangers in the previous season, when the Rangers stopped playing, expecting a foul to be given, but Chevalier played to the signal.

He continued playing for the Old Etonians in the 1884–85 FA Cup, scoring three goals in three matches (at Luton Wanderers in the first round, in a replay win against Brentwood in the second, and against Middlesbrough in the third).

=== Derby County ===
At the start of the 1883–84 season, Chevallier had joined the new Derby County club, having become a schoolmaster at the local Repton School. Whilst at Derby, he scored in the club's first home game and also notched a hat-trick at Nottingham Forest. However, to the club's disappointment, Chevallier preferred to play for his old school in the Cup, his decision justified by Derby's 7–0 defeat in the first round to Walsall Town.

=== Ipswich Town ===
1884–85 marked the last time Chevallier played in the FA Cup, as his father died in 1885, and Chevallier left his role at Repton to take over the family business. He joined the local football club, Ipswich Town, and played one match for the club in the Suffolk Senior Cup. In later years, he acted as an umpire on behalf of the club.

== Post-football career ==
Chevallier ran Aspall until his death in 1940; one of his key innovations was to replace the wooden screw in the 1728 apple press with a new metal replacement. He also served as a Justice of the Peace and as a director of the Mid-Suffolk Light Railway. During the First World War, he served in the Volunteer Corps.

On his death at home in February 1940, he left an estate worth £8,105 (£4,113 net) to his three daughters, with £50 left to his "cyder maker" George Sparrow and £50 to his housekeeper Anne Powell.

== Footballing honours ==
Old Etonians

- FA Cup winner: 1879, 1882
- Runner-up: 1881
