= Philip Novelli =

English footballer (1857–1905)

Personal information
- Full name: Philip Charles Novelli
- Date of birth: 17 September 1857
- Place of birth: London
- Date of death: 4 December 1905 (aged 48)
- Place of death: London
- Position: Left forward

Senior career*
| Years | Team | Apps | (Gls) |
| 1876 | Swifts | | |
| 1876–77 | Cambridge University | | |
| 1878–85 | Old Etonians | | |
- * Club domestic league appearances and goals

Philip Charles Novelli (17 September 1857 - 4 December 1905) was an amateur English footballer and merchant. He won the FA Cup with Old Etonians in 1882 playing as a left forward.

== Family background ==
Novelli was born in London, the son of Augustus Novelli. He was educated at Eton College, where he stroked the college eight in rowing in 1876. He also played as an Oppidan in the St Andrew's Day Wall Game in 1875, which, unsurprisingly, ended goalless. In 1876, he went up to Trinity College, Cambridge, and graduated in 1880.

== Football career ==
Novelli played for Eton against external opposition for the first time in December 1875, in a defeat to the Swifts; in the equivalent fixture in 1876, possibly to make up the numbers, he turned out for the Swifts instead, and scored a goal against his school in the Swifts' 3–1 win. He also played for a Cambridge University twelve against an Eton twelve later that year, although he never played in the Varsity match.

He made his debut for the Old Etonians in competitive football at the Kennington Oval in the first round of the 1878–79 FA Cup, in which the Etonians stunned the Cup holders Wanderers with a 7–2 victory, one of the key factors being Arthur Kinnaird having eschewed the Wanderers for his former school; Novelli himself scored twice.

He only played once more in the Cup that season, so missed out on the Etonians' Cup win, and missed out in the 1879–80 season altogether. He returned to the Old Etonians side in the first round in the 1880–81 FA Cup, scoring the second and clinching goal in the second round win over Hendon after Kinnaird hooked back an over-hit cross from Foley, and played in every match up to and including the final. However he did not feature in the newspaper reports for the final, which Old Carthusians easily won.

In the 1881–82 FA Cup, he played for the Etonians in every round except for the fourth round win over Maidenhead, and this time had a much better final, perplexing Blackburn Rovers with his "dashing" runs and shooting narrowly over the bar twice, one observer considering him man of the match.

He played three times more in the following season's competition, but his appearance in the 7–0 win over Rochester was his last competitive match for the O.Es. He played for the Old Etonians until 1885, his last recorded match being against the Old Harrovians in March that year.

== Post-football career ==
On 19 January 1882, Novelli passed the Intermediate bar examination, and practised briefly as a solicitor. On 24 April 1889, he was made a Grand Steward of the Freemasons under Pro Grand Master Earl of Carnarvon and his Deputy, the Earl of Lathom.

He married Edith Preston on 20 October 1887, in Hove Parish Church, Sussex, by which time he was described as a merchant; the marriage produced one son (also called Philip). Novelli was particularly influential in the affairs of the St. Lawrence Lumber Company.

On 4 December 1905, at his trading offices in Idol Lane, Great Tower Street, London, Novelli stepped onto the balcony fronting his office, and shot himself through the head; his death was instantaneous. There had been no indications of suicidal tendencies, but his estate of £4,240 5/5 was notably much lower than the c. £50,000 inheritance he had received from his father, in part due to the earlier collapse of Novelli & Co in 1894.

== Honours ==
Old Etonians

- FA Cup winner: 1882
- FA Cup finalist: 1881
