= Doctor Greenwood =

English footballer

Personal information
- Full name: Doctor Haydock Greenwood
- Date of birth: 31 October 1860
- Place of birth: Blackburn, England
- Date of death: 3 November 1951 (aged 91)
- Place of death: England
- Position: Full-back

Senior career*
Years	Team	Apps	(Gls)
1878–1882	Blackburn Rovers		
- Corinthian

International career
1882	England	2	(0)
- * Club domestic league appearances and goals

Doctor Haydock "Doc" Greenwood (31 October 1860 – 3 November 1951) was an English footballer who played for Blackburn Rovers and made two appearances for England in 1882. "Doctor" was his Christian name and was not in recognition of any medical or academic qualifications.

== Career ==
Greenwood was born in Blackburn, educated at Malvern College and was a member of the college football team in 1878–79. Greenwood's older brothers, Thomas and Harry, joined Blackburn Rovers shortly after the club's formation in 1875 and both played in the first match on 18 December 1875, with Thomas in goal and Harry as a forward. Thomas Greenwood was appointed captain and although Doctor was only 15, he also joined the club, soon becoming one of the stars of the side, playing as a full-back.

By 1880 Blackburn had become one of the best teams in England. Greenwood was recognised as being an outstanding full back and on 18 February 1882 he won his first international cap playing for England against Ireland. Also playing in that game were fellow Blackburn players, Jimmy Brown and Fred Hargreaves. Ireland were "totally dominated by the visitors" who won the game 13–0. This remains England's highest ever winning margin. Greenwood's next game was against Scotland on 11 March 1882. This time England team were beaten 5–1 and Greenwood was not selected for the next game against Wales.

In 1882, Blackburn became the first provincial team to reach the final of the FA Cup. Their opponents were Old Etonians who had reached the final on five previous occasions. However, Blackburn had gone through the season unbeaten and were expected to become the first northern team to win the game. Unfortunately Greenwood was injured and was unable to appear in the final, which the Old Etonians won 1–0.

Greenwood was an amateur player and in 1882 he was a member of the Corinthian committee at the time of their formation.

During the 1920s he was an active croquet player, an original member of the Buxton club with a handicap of 2.5.
