= Reginald Macaulay =

English footballer (1858–1937)

Personal information
- Born: 24 August 1858; Hodnet, Shropshire
- Died: 15 December 1937 (aged 79); Hampstead, London,

Sport
- Sport: Football / Athletics
- Event: high jump
- Club: Old Etonians / Cambridge UAC

Reginald Heber Macaulay (24 August 1858 – 15 December 1937) was an amateur English footballer and merchant. He won the FA Cup with Old Etonians in 1882 and made one appearance for England in 1881 playing as a forward.

== Family background ==
Macaulay was born in Hodnet, Shropshire, son of a rector of the parish who was cousin of the historian Lord Macaulay. Classical scholar George Campbell Macaulay was a brother, through whom author Rose Macaulay was his niece. His forenames appear to have been given after Bishop Reginald Heber (1783-1826), also an earlier rector of Hodnet.

== Career ==
Macaulay was educated at Eton College, where he played for the college "soccer" team in 1878.

He went up to King's College, Cambridge, where he won a Cambridge University "Blue" in 1881 and 1882. He was also an athlete and represented the university between 1879 and 1882 at the high jump and the quarter mile, becoming the British high jump champion at the 1879 AAC Championships. Academically, he graduated as BA 1st Class in 1882, and was awarded an honorary MA in 1914.

He continued to play for the Old Etonians whilst at university, helping them reach successive finals from 1881 to 1883, losing out 3–0 to Old Carthusians in 1881 and going down to a surprise 2–1 defeat to Blackburn Olympic in 1883.

In the 1882 FA Cup Final, however, he contributed to the only goal in a 1–0 victory over Blackburn Rovers, although reporters differed as to how he played. According to a match report in Gibbons' "Association Football in Victorian England", "following an expert through ball by Dunn, Macaulay (sic) steered the ball between the Blackburn goalposts to secure a well-deserved half-time lead". However, reporters from two of the sports journals represented, The Sportsman and The Field, both reported Macaulay making a run to pass the ball to Arthur Dunn who in turn passed it to William Anderson, who then scored the goal. Macaulay, according to a tribute printed after his death in The Times, liked to recall he outpaced the Blackburn players and helped towards the goal, without claiming to score. The Old Etonians were able to prevent Blackburn from scoring in the second half, thus claiming the cup for the second time in three years.

His solitary appearance for England came against Scotland on 9 April 1881, a few weeks before his first FA Cup Final appearance. Macaulay played as an inside forward, but England went down to a "humiliating" 6–1 defeat.

C.W. Alcock described Macaulay as "fast on the side, and works hard. Heavy centre-forward. Can make a good run, has plenty of pace but over-runs the ball and is not clever in close quarters", while another summary noted he was "a good shot at goal".

He also played (when they and the Old Etonians were not competing in the FA Cup ties) for Clapham Rovers.

On leaving university, he went to work in India. From 1884 to his returning to England in 1901, he was a merchant with Wallace & Co of Bombay and chairman of the Bombay Burmah Trading Corporation. He was also a member of the Bombay Legislative Council. In London he became an East India merchant in Wallace & Co.

== Retirement and later life ==
In retirement Macaulay lived partly in Argyll, where he was a reputed good field shooter, and cultivated a famous rock garden at Kirnan where he bred Gentiana Macaulayi, named after himself. He also made regular visits to India, Burma and Siam (now Thailand).

He died at Hampstead, London, in December 1937, aged seventy-nine, and was buried at Hampstead Parish Church.

== Honours ==
=== Football ===
Old Etonians

- FA Cup winner: 1882
- FA Cup finalist: 1881 & 1883

=== Athletics ===
- Amateur Athletic Club high jump champion: 1879
