= Lewis Richards (footballer, born 1861) =

English footballer

Personal information
- Full name: Lewis Matthew Richards
- Date of birth: 12 September 1861
- Place of birth: Bridgend, Wales
- Date of death: 30 November 1918 (aged 57)
- Place of death: Chelsea, London
- Position: Forward

Senior career*
| Years | Team | Apps | (Gls) |
| 1880–1885 | Old Carthusians | | |
| 1882 | Cambridge University | | |
- * Club domestic league appearances and goals

Lewis Richards (12 September 1861 – 30 November 1918) was a Welsh amateur footballer who played for Old Carthusians in its 1881 FA Cup Final win.

== Career ==
Richards was born in Bridgend, Glamorgan, in 1861, the son of Richard Richards, a landowner, and Catherine Thomas. He was educated at Charterhouse School, and as a footballer progressed from playing for the "twenty-two" against the "eleven" in 1877 to playing for the first XI in 1878. He went up to Trinity College, Cambridge in 1880.

The Old Carthusians first entered the FA Cup in 1879–80 FA Cup, and Richards made his debut in the first round in the 1880–81 competition, as a left-sided forward against Saffron Walden; he scored the final goal in a 7–0 victory. He played in most of the ties that season, although he missed the win over the Royal Engineers after a last-minute issue, and in the final against the Old Etonians played as a right-sided forward. He played a key part in the third goal, as his shot deflected off team-mate Alexander Tod to close out the scoring.

Richards starred in a 7–1 win over Barnes in the following season's first round, scoring once, hitting the woodwork, and creating the scrimmage that led to the first goal. However he missed the tie against the Royal Engineers in the third round, with the O.C.s fielding a considerably under-strength side, and the Sappers won 2–0.

He received his Cambridge blue in football in 1882, albeit he was on the losing side, as Oxford won 3–0.

By 1884–85, he was winding down his competitive career; although he played for the Carthusians in several ties that season, he was also the O.C.s' nominated umpire for the win over Grimsby Town, and the semi-final loss against Blackburn Rovers in Nottingham was his final competitive match. By 1886 he was living and working in Wales, and represented South Wales in a cricket match against the M.C.C. at Swansea in August 1886, taking 6 wickets.

== Personal life ==
After graduating, he was called to the Bar in 1884, and was a special pleader on the South Wales circuit. He married Gertrude Elizabeth Grantham on 28 November 1899 at St Michael's Church in Westminster, and the couple had three daughters and two sons.

Richards died in 1918, and his estate was recorded as being worth over £56,500.

== Honours ==
Old Carthusians

- FA Cup winner: 1881
