= Thomas French (footballer) =

English footballer (1857–1905)

Personal information
- Full name: Thomas Harvey French
- Date of birth: c. 1860
- Place of birth: Worlingworth, Suffolk
- Date of death: 8 November 1908
- Place of death: Lansdowne, India
- Position: Full-back

Senior career*
Years	Team	Apps	(Gls)
1879–83	Oxford University		
1880–87	Old Etonians		
1886–88	Reading		
- * Club domestic league appearances and goals

Thomas French was an amateur English footballer, who won the FA Cup with Old Etonians in 1882, playing as a full-back.

== Family background ==
French was the son of Frederic French, rector of St Mary's Church in Worlingworth, Suffolk. He was educated at Eton College, where he was a King's Scholar, earning the Prince Consort prize for excellence in German in 1875. He played in the cricket first XI in 1878 and as a Colleger in the St Andrew's Day Wall Game in 1877 and 1878, the Collegers winning both times, by 10 and 9 shies to nil respectively.

He went up to Merton College, Oxford in 1879, graduating in 1883.

== Football career ==
His first competitive football came in the 1879–80 FA Cup, representing Oxford University in the first round against Great Marlow, against Birmingham in the second (in which his back play was particularly praised), and the Royal Engineers in both the semi-final and the replay.

Despite playing a conspicuous part in the Cup run, French did not (yet) get his Blue, and, having missed out on the final, for the 1880–81 FA Cup he switched allegiance to the Old Etonians. He was almost an ever-present in the side, which reached the final, in which the Old Carthusians easily beat the Etonians.

In the 1881–82 FA Cup, he played for the Etonians in every round except for the fourth round win over Maidenhead, and his "grand kicking" in the final was a major factor in the Etonians beating Blackburn Rovers by the only goal; a strong French shoulder-charge on Geoffrey Avery put the smaller forward out of the game for ten minutes.

French was also a regular in the following season's competition, and was considered the second-best of the Etonians in the final (after Arthur Kinnaird), but the Etonians lost to Blackburn Olympic, and no amateur side has reached the final since.

He played for the Etonians in its shock defeat to Hendon in the first round in the 1883–84 competition, some of the cause for the defeat being put down to him being "hardly at his best". He had a better run in the competition in 1884–85 FA Cup, reaching the quarter-finals, where the Old Boys Nottingham Forest; the game was a personal disaster for French, as a missed train meant that he was absent for the first ten minutes of the game, in which time the Etonians conceded the opening goal.

While playing for the Old Etonians, French also finally obtained his Blue in the Varsity Match in both 1882 and 1883, captaining the Oxford side in the latter year; Oxford won 3–0 in the former year but lost 3–2 in the latter.

By 1886 however the game had by-passed the Etonians. An anaemic French-less Etonians was hammered 6–1 by Marlow in the first round in the 1885–86 FA Cup, and French's last match in the competition was a third round defeat to the Old Westminsters in 1886–87.

As the game became more professional, French remained at the first-class level by joining Reading, and represented the Berkshire & Buckinghamshire FA in inter-association matches as a Reading player. His final match of note seems to have been in the Berks & Bucks Senior Cup first round victory over Windsor in December 1887.

== Post-football career ==
French married Louisa Acton at Iwerne Minster in Dorset on New Year's Day in 1890, at which time he was a schoolmaster in Yorkshire. He eventually moved to British India as a teacher at Rajkumar College, Rajkot, where he taught the children of the Maharajah of Baroda; he died when up-country on 8 November 1908, leaving an estate worth £4,774.

== Honours ==
Old Etonians

- FA Cup winner: 1882
- FA Cup finalist: 1881, 1883
