= Alexander Tod =

English footballer

Personal information
- Full name: Alexander Hay Tod
- Date of birth: 25 March 1857
- Place of birth: the High Seas
- Date of death: 22 January 1942 (aged 84)
- Place of death: Bristol
- Position: Forward

Senior career*
Years	Team	Apps	(Gls)
1877–82	Old Carthusians		
- * Club domestic league appearances and goals

Alexander Tod was an English amateur footballer who scored for Old Carthusians in its 1881 FA Cup Final win.

== Career ==
Tod was born on board the ship HMS Trafalgar, the son of Lieutenant Alexander George Tod of the Madras Light Infantry and his wife Isabella, on 25 March 1857.

He went up to Charterhouse School, an early hotbed of the Association game, in 1869, and captained the "twenty-two" against the "eleven" in an inter-school match in 1873. He made an appearance for the celebrated Wanderers, albeit only as a "substitute", as Charles Alcock could only persuade six Wanderers to turn up to Godalming for a match against Charterhouse School, so Tod was one of many schoolboys recruited to help the visitors. His first goal in a "first-class" match was against Weyside in a 2–0 win in early 1874; he scored a hat-trick against the 10th Regiment at Christmas the following year.

By 1876 he had left school, and represented the Old Carthusians against the school in February 1877. He took his degree at Trinity College, Oxford, although never represented the University on the football pitch.

The Old Carthusians first entered the FA Cup in 1879–80 FA Cup, and Tod appeared in the O.C.'s first-ever Cup match, a 4–0 win over Acton, as a right-sided forward, scoring the second goal. He did not however play in the second round defeat at the Kennington Oval against the Wanderers.

In the 1880–81 FA Cup, he did not appear until the fifth round, this time on the left of the forward line; at that stage the Carthusians knocked out the holders Clapham Rovers. He had a decisive impact in the semi-final scoring one of the O.C.'s four goals against Darwen, as well as coming close with another shot and claiming a share in the "assist" for another goal. His crowning achievement was scoring the third and decisive goal in the final against the Old Etonians, either by deflecting a shot from Richards or finishing a pass from William Page.

He played in the O.C.'s three ties in the 1881–82 FA Cup, but the defeat in the third round by the Royal Engineers was his final match in the competition. His final game for the O.C.s appears to have been the club's 2–0 win at Sheffield F.C. in January 1882.

== Personal life ==
After graduation, Tod became a teacher at Charterhouse, ultimately becoming Master of Verites House. He was also commissioned as an historian to write the history of the school, first published in 1905. Tod died in Clifton, Bristol, on 22 January 1942, leaving an estate of £15,571 2/2.

== Honours ==
Old Carthusians

- FA Cup winner: 1881
