= Harry Sharples =

English footballer

Harry Sharples (born 1861 or 1862) was an English footballer who played for Blackburn Rovers in the 1882 FA Cup final.

== Career ==
Sharples was born in Blackburn, Lancashire in 1861 or 1862, and started playing for Blackburn Rovers in the 1880–81 season; in common with a lot of players for the Rovers, he had an easy job through which he was paid a disguised wage - Sharples was the son of a cotton manufacturer, and he had been made a cotton mill manager while still a teenager.

He made his FA Cup debut for Rovers in the club's 6–2 first round win over Bolton Wanderers in 1881–82, as a half-back, and he scored the Rovers' final goal. He was not however a regular player - he did not make another appearance in the Cup until the semi-final replay win against Sheffield Wednesday, as a late replacement for "Dock" Greenwood, who had been injured playing for England. Greenwood had hoped to be fit for the final, but he failed a last-minute test, and Sharples deputed again.

Sharples' last appearance in the competition was in the 11–1 win over Blackpool in the first round of the 1882–83 FA Cup. Almost straight after the match Sharples emigrated to New Zealand, which put an end to a promising career; although he returned after 12 months he does not seem to have taken the game up again.
