= Rupert Anderson =

English footballer

Personal information
- Full name: Rupert Darnley Anderson
- Date of birth: 29 April 1859
- Place of birth: Liverpool, England
- Date of death: 23 December 1944 (aged 85)
- Place of death: Surrey, England
- Position: Goalkeeper

Senior career*
Years	Team	Apps	(Gls)
- Old Etonians

International career
1879	England	1	(0)
- * Club domestic league appearances and goals

Rupert Darnley Anderson OBE DL, (29 April 1859 – 23 December 1944) was an English footballer who played for Old Etonians, as well as the England national side. He was later a fruit broker.

Anderson was born in Liverpool, the fifth of six children. He was educated at Eton and then went up to Cambridge. His club career began and ended with Old Etonians. However, he missed the team's 1879 F.A. Cup final triumph through injury.

Also in 1879, Anderson made his sole appearance for the England team, playing in goal (his usual position being that of a forward) against Wales. The match was hampered by snowy conditions and the game was reduced to just sixty minutes of play. The game ended 2–1 to England.

== Family life ==
Anderson went to Florida where he owned a number of orange groves; he would later become a fruit broker. He returned to England from Florida in March 1889 to marry Amy Harland, with whom he had five children. They returned to England and with the death of his elder brother he inherited Waverley Abbey House. While the house was used as a military hospital during the First World War, Anderson was commissioned in the 5th Queen's Royal West Surrey Regiment and also served with the Royal Air Force. He was the brother of William Joseph Anderson who scored the only goal in the 1882 FA Cup Final.

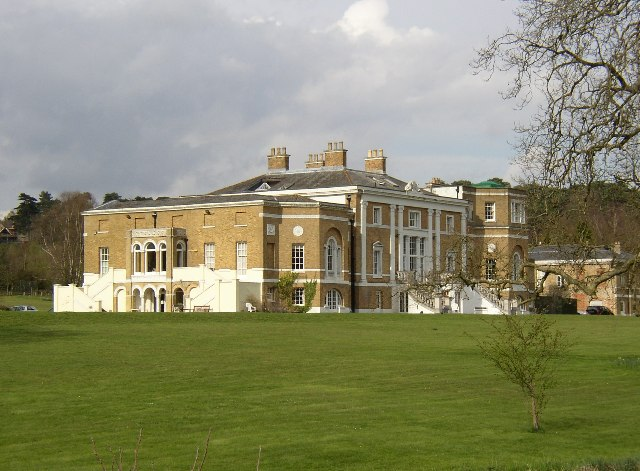
Anderson lived in the family home at Waverley Abbey House in Farnham, Surrey until his death in 1944.
