= Walter Norris (footballer) =

English footballer

Personal information
- Full name: Walter Harry Norris
- Date of birth: 8 April 1863
- Place of birth: Epsom, Surrey
- Date of death: 14 May 1931 (aged 68)
- Place of death: Brackley, Northamptonshire
- Position: Forward

Senior career*
Years	Team	Apps	(Gls)
1881–1885	Old Carthusians		
- * Club domestic league appearances and goals

Walter Harry Norris (8 April 1863 - 14 May 1931) was an association football full-back who won the FA Cup in 1881 playing for the Old Carthusians.

== Family and early life ==
Norris was born in Epsom and was the son of James Norris, a wealthy wine merchant, and Susanna; the family home was Castle Hill House in Bletchingly, and his father employed a number of servants.

He was educated at Charterhouse School, playing in the school's XI in 1880.

== Football career ==
Although Norris played for the school as a goalkeeper, his career with the Old Carthusians started with him as a defender. He made his debut for the O.C.s in fourth round of the 1880–81 FA Cup in the side's win at the Royal Engineers, as a late replacement for Herbert Somers-Cocks; his back play was described as "beyond praise". Having established his place in the side, he played in the remaining rounds, and was notable in the final for silencing the Etonian forward line, being especially important as full-back partner Colvin was "rather erratic with his kicks".

Norris continued playing for the Carthusians in the competition until 1884–85; he had occasionally played in goal for friendly matches, and took the position permanently in his last season. He only played in two ties, a 5–3 win over Great Marlow in the third round and a 5–1 defeat to Blackburn Rovers in the semi-final; such was the dominance of the professional side that Norris had to make four saves in the first five minutes. There is no record of him playing football again, but he continued to play for the Old Carthusians cricket side until 1891, usually as opening batsman.

Norris never earned an international cap; he was one of a number of reserves for England's 13–0 win over Ireland in 1882.

== Business career ==
Norris married Helen Mary White on 20 November 1894 at Caterham Parish Church; he was described as a brewer on the marriage certificate, which undersold that he was a director of the Brackley and Banbury Brewery, later known as Hopcraft and Norris Limited.

Norris died in Brackley in 1931, and was survived by his widow and his two sons, James and Graham, leaving a fortune of over £33,300 (£1.9m in 2024 terms). Graham died 2 years later from an injury sustained while steeplechasing.
