= Graham Norris =

English cricketer

Graham Walter "Bay" Norris (1905–1933) was an English cricketer active from 1925 to 1926 who played for Northamptonshire (Northants). He was born at Steane Park near Brackley, Northamptonshire on 17 October 1905, the son of former FA Cup winner Walter Norris.

Norris appeared in five first-class matches as a righthanded batsman who bowled right arm medium pace. He scored 38 runs with a highest score of 16 and took seven wickets with a best performance of three for 48. Educated at Eton College and Hertford College, Oxford, he was a director of the family brewery. A successful rider in point-to-points and under National Hunt Rules he died in the Horton Hospital at Banbury, Oxfordshire on 6 December 1933, from injuries received when his horse fell at Birmingham Races a week before his death.
