= Percy de Paravicini =

English footballer and cricketer

Cricket information
- Batting: Right-handed
- Bowling: Right-arm slow

Career statistics
Competition	First-class
Matches	121
Runs scored	2,699
Batting average	15.51
100s/50s	0/11
Top score	77
Balls bowled	2,227
Wickets	32
Bowling average	32.75
5 wickets in innings	0
10 wickets in match	0
Best bowling	4/26
Catches/stumpings	70/–
- Source: CricInfo, 19 December 2018

Percy John de Paravicini CVO (15 July 1862 – 11 October 1921) was an English amateur cricketer and international footballer in the late nineteenth century.

== Early life and education ==
He was born in Kensington, London, the son of Baron James Prior de Paravicini, of Riverside, Datchet, Windsor. He was educated at Aldin House, Slough and Eton College, where he was a member of the cricket eleven from 1878 to 1881, being captain in 1880 and 1881.

== Cricket career ==
De Paravicini was one of an elite few to have played for the Eton College cricket XI for four consecutive years, and arguably he was one of the best players the school has had. He was captain in 1880 and 1881 (i.e. Keeper of the Field). He played against his brother, Harry, in the annual Eton v Harrow cricket match held at Lord's Cricket Ground.

He made his first-class debut for Middlesex on 15 August 1881 at Old Trafford, Manchester in the County Tournament against Lancashire. He continued to appear for Middlesex throughout August, playing in four county matches, scoring only 33 runs and taking one wicket. He was a right-handed middle-order batsman, a slow round-arm bowler and an outstanding fielder.

In the autumn of 1881 he went up to Trinity College, Cambridge where he won a cricket blue in each of his four years (1882 to 1885). He played his first cricket match for the University on 25 May 1882 against the "Gentlemen of England". In 1882 he appeared six times for Cambridge University.

1883 was his best season, making 17 appearances (7 for the university, 8 for Middlesex and 2 for representative teams) scoring 595 runs at an average of 24.79 and taking 16 wickets at an average of 20.75. In the match at The Oval for the university against Surrey in June he made his best score to date with 61 in the first innings and taking 4 wickets for 26 runs. In this match Charles Studd made his best ever score with 175 n.o. as the university won the match by 200 runs.

In 1888 he improved his best batting performance, with 77 for Middlesex against Nottinghamshire in June; he scored a total of 485 in the season at an average of 14.69.

During his first-class career he played 62 times for Middlesex and 25 for Cambridge University. He also played for Buckinghamshire from 1899 to 1911.

== Football career ==
Percy de Paravicini
Personal information
- Full name: Percy John de Paravicini
- Date of birth: 15 July 1862
- Place of birth: Kensington, London, England
- Date of death: 11 October 1921 (aged 59)
- Place of death: Pangbourne, England
- Position: Full-back

Youth career
- 1878–1881: Eton College

Senior career*
Years	Team	Apps	(Gls)
1882–1883	Old Etonians		
1883	Cambridge University		
- Corinthian

International career
1883	England	3	(0)
- * Club domestic league appearances and goals

At Cambridge University he won his blue for football in 1883. A "speedy, two-footed defender", he appeared in two FA Cup Finals for Old Etonians, being on the winning side in 1882 against Blackburn Rovers, but losing out the following year to Blackburn Olympic.

In the 1882 final, he was part of the last "all amateur" side to win the FA Cup as well as the last team from south of Birmingham to win it during the nineteenth century. The Old Etonians fielded a team with nine players with previous FA Cup final experience, having reached the final four times in the previous seven seasons. In the match itself, de Paravicini and Arthur Kinnaird managed to contain the Blackburn Rovers forwards, whilst the Old Boys' forwards continually created problems for the Rovers' defence until Reginald Macaulay managed to steer the ball between the Blackburn goalposts for the only goal of the game.

In February and March 1883 he was selected for all three England internationals, against Scotland, Wales and Ireland. England comfortably defeated the Welsh 5–0 (with a hat trick from Clement Mitchell) and the Irish 7–0, but lost out to the Scots by the odd goal in five.

On 31 March 1883, the Old Etonians reached the FA Cup final for the third consecutive year and were comfortable favourites to defeat Blackburn Olympic. Olympic however were well organised and defeated the Old Boys 2–1 after extra time.

After his exploits in the FA Cup and for England, de Paravicini made occasional appearances for the Corinthians. He also played for Windsor football club and made representative appearances for London, Berkshire and Buckinghamshire, and The South versus The North.

=== Honours ===
Old Etonians

- FA Cup winner: 1882
- FA Cup finalist: 1883

== Life outside sport ==
At Eton he was a president of 'Pop'; the group of 25 elected prefects.

He was a J.P. for Buckinghamshire and during the First World War took command of the Datchet Volunteer Platoon. He was decorated with the Commander, Royal Victorian Order (C.V.O.).

He is also credited with being on the inaugural committee for Stoke Park Club based in Stoke Poges, and the only member of the Corinthians on the committee at the time.

== Family and death ==
On 21 May 1891, he married Lady Marcia Charlotte Maria Cholmondeley, daughter of Charles George, the Viscount Malpas. His brother, Harry Farquhar de Paravicini, married Lady Marcia's sister, Lady Eva Harriet Cholmondeley.

They lived in the family home at Riverside, Datchet and had three sons. He died on 11 October 1921 at Hill Fields, Pangbourne, Berkshire, England aged 59 following an operation. His obituary in Wisden stated: "Few men personally more popular have ever been seen in the cricket field. His career was in one respect peculiar. He was in proportion a far greater force in his school days than he ever became in first-class matches."
