= Harry de Paravicini =

English cricketer

Personal information
- Full name: Harry Farquhar de Paravicini
- Born: 20 October 1859; Kensington, Middlesex, England
- Died: 28 October 1942 (aged 83); Hove, Sussex, England
- Batting: Right-handed
- Relatives: Percy de Paravicini (brother)

Domestic team information
- Years: Team
- 1882–1885: Marylebone Cricket Club

Career statistics
Competition	First-class
Matches	6
Runs scored	64
Batting average	10.66
100s/50s	–/–
Top score	28*
Catches/stumpings	1/–
- Source: Cricinfo, 23 June 2019

Harry Farquhar de Paravicini (20 October 1859 – 28 October 1942) was an English first-class cricketer.

The son of Baron James Prior de Paravicini, he was born at Kensington in March 1846. He was educated at Harrow School, before going up to Jesus College, Cambridge. He made his debut in first-class cricket for the Marylebone Cricket Club (MCC) against Kent at Lord's in 1882. de Paravicini made two further first-class appearances for the MCC, both against Cambridge University in 1883 and 1885. He later played a first-class match for I Zingari against the Gentlemen of England in 1887, before making two first-class appearances in 1888, playing once more for I Zingari and for C. I. Thornton's XI. Across six first-class matches, de Paravicini scored 64 runs at an average of 10.66, with a high score of 28 not out. He married Alice Elizabeth Vane (née Booth) in 1879 and Lady Eva Harriet Cholmondeley, daughter of Charles George Cholmondeley, Viscount Malpas, in 1913. He died at Hove in October 1942. His brother, Percy de Paravicini, was also a first-class cricketer.
