= Lady Blanche Addle =

Front cover of "Lady Addle Remembers" - "The portrait shows myself as "India" in the Church pageant of 1897

Lady Blanche Addle was a fictitious character created by the British author Mary Dunn (1900–1958) First published in the 1930s Dunn's Lady Addle books amusingly parody and satirise the then British upper classes, and particularly the works of Walburga, Lady Paget; Daisy, Princess of Pless and Adeline, Countess of Cardigan and Lancastre. It could also have mentioned Lady Sybil Grant. In her two books Mary Dunn traces the life Lady Addle née Lady Blanche Coot daughter of the 13th Earl of Coot from her Victorian childhood until World War II.

The books are written in the first person in the form of "memoirs". Lady Addle details in gushing tones the daily and mundane details of her and her family's uneventful life in such a fashion that she believes they will be of great interest to future generations. written with a subtle humour of which Lady Addle is seemingly unaware. Lady Addle fancies herself a poet and author whose literary works are of high merit when in fact they are banal, and she gives hilarious suggestions on cookery and entertaining as serious fact.

A second character detailed in the books is "Millicent, Duchess of Brisket", commonly known as "Mipsie." She is Lady Blanche's much married sister, née Lady Millicent Coote, a nymphomaniac, black marketeer, brothel keeper and gold digger, facts which Lady Addle unwittingly details while concentrating only on the tragedies of Mipsie's life, and how misunderstood she is.

The books are illustrated by genuine Victorian photographs of members of the British upper class that have been hideously altered. For example, Lady Addle's mother, the Countess of Coote, is heavy-browed and cross-eyed, yet the photograph is captioned "My beautiful Mother", Lady Mipsie, later the Duchess of Brisket, is always shown with wild hair and protruding teeth is captioned "Mipsie at her loveliest"

LadAddle symbolises in a humorous way those females of the early 20th century British aristocracy who subconsciously felt themselves more talented and intelligent than those of less exalted birth, encouraged by a period when it was not uncommon for the pronouncements and literary efforts of upper-class women to be eagerly consumed by an aspiring middle class.

Lady Addle's philosophy can best be explained in the preface to Lady Addle Remembers

"Lady Addle hesitated to publish her memoirs on the grounds it would involve certain disclosures about some of the most illustrious names in Europe.........Destiny - has decreed that my ways should be in high places, I have played Halma with Lord Salisbury. I have bicycled with Bismark, I have knitted a comforter for a King. It is not fitting that I should speak of such moments"

Yet she forces herself to do so.
