= Mary Dunn (writer) =

English writer and satirist

Mary Dunn (1900–1958) was an English writer and satirist best known for the Lady Addle books. Her father was Arthur Dunn.

== Selected publications ==
- Lady Addle Remembers: Being the Memoirs of the Lady Addle of Eigg (1936)
- Lady Addle at Home (1945)
- The Memoirs of Mipsie (1947)
- Round the Year with Lady Addle (1948)
- The World of Lady Addle (1986)
