= 1881 FA Cup final =

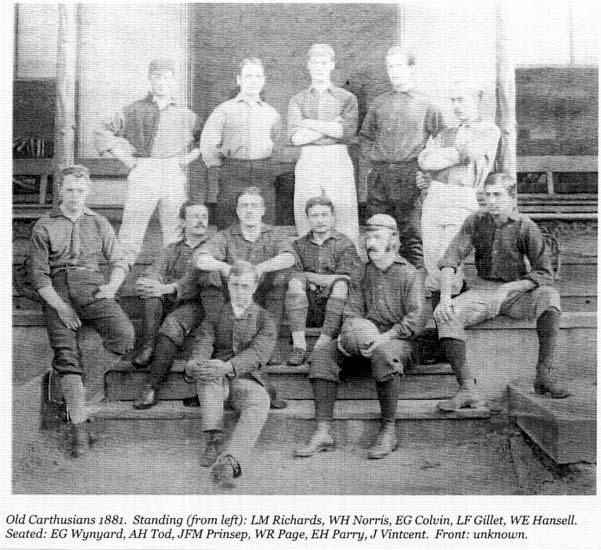
- Old Carthusians, winning side
- Event: 1880–81 FA Cup
Old Carthusians	Old Etonians
3	0
- Date: 9 April 1881
- Venue: Kennington Oval, London
- Referee: William Peirce Dix
- Attendance: 4,000

The 1881 FA Cup final was contested by Old Carthusians and Old Etonians at the Kennington Oval. Old Carthusians won 3–0, the goals scored by Edward Wynyard, Edward Hagarty Parry, and Alexander Tod.

== Summary ==
The final was played at the Kennington Oval on 9 April 1881; this was the Old Carthusians first appearance in the final and the Old Etonians, on their fourth appearance, were expected to win comfortably. In the event, the Old Carthusians won convincingly.

The Carthusians were eventually bailed by the winners... the game from first to last was of a very fast character. The winning team was in first-rate condition, and each member seemed to thoroughly understand the other's play. This all the more creditable, as although plenty of good players yearly leave Charterhouse, the Old Carthusians is a club of comparatively recent growth.

— The Times, 11 April 1881

== Match details ==
1880–81 FA Cup
9 April 1881

Old Carthusians	3–0	Old Etonians
Wynyard; Parry; Tod	Report

Kennington Oval, London
Attendance: 4,000
Referee: William Peirce Dix

O. Carthusians	Old Etonians

GK	(England) Leonard Gillett
DF	(England) Walter Norris
DF	(England) Elliott Colvin
MF	(England) James F. M. Prinsep
MF	(Cape Colony) Sir Joseph Vintcent Jnr.
FW	(England) Walter Hansell
FW	(Wales) Lewis Richards
FW	(England) William Page
FW	(England) Edward Wynyard
FW	(England) Edward Hagarty Parry
FW	(England) Alexander Tod

GK	(England) John Rawlinson
DF	(England) Charles Foley
DF	(England) Thomas French
MF	(Scotland) Hon. Arthur Kinnaird
MF	(England) Bryan Farrer
FW	(England) Reginald Macaulay
FW	(England) Harry Goodhart
FW	(England) Herbert Whitfeld
FW	(England) Philip Novelli
FW	(England) William Anderson
FW	(England) John Barrington Chevallier
