= John Hargreaves (footballer) =

English footballer

Personal information
- Date of birth: 13 December 1860
- Place of birth: Blackburn, England
- Date of death: 13 January 1903 (aged 42)
- Place of death: Wilpshire, England
- Position: Winger

Senior career*
Years	Team	Apps	(Gls)
- Blackburn Rovers

International career
1881	England	2	(0)
- * Club domestic league appearances and goals

John Hargreaves (13 December 1860 – 13 January 1903) was an English international footballer who played as a winger.

== Career ==
Hargreaves was born in Blackburn, the son of the city coroner, and attended Malvern College where he began playing football. He played for Blackburn Rovers between 1878 and 1884, playing in their FA Cup win in 1884 as well as taking a runner-up spot in the 1882 final. He made two appearances for England in 1881. England lost both games.

He worked as a solicitor from 1884.

His older brother was fellow Blackburn Rovers and England player Fred Hargreaves.

He died at Wilpshire, near Blackburn, on 13 January 1903, aged 42.
