= Edward Hagarty Parry =

Canadian-born English footballer

Personal information
- Full name: Edward Hagarty Parry
- Date of birth: 24 April 1855
- Place of birth: Toronto, British Canada
- Date of death: 19 July 1931 (aged 76)
- Place of death: West Bridgford, England
- Position: Forward

Senior career*
Years	Team	Apps	(Gls)
- Oxford University
- Old Carthusians
- Swifts
- Remnants
–1883	Wanderers		
- Stoke Poges FC
- Windsor

International career
1879–1882	England	3	(1)
- * Club domestic league appearances and goals

Edward Hagarty Parry (24 April 1855 – 19 July 1931) was a footballer. Born in Canada, he played for the England national team.

== Early life ==
Born in Toronto, Ontario, where his father served as a clergyman, Parry attended Charterhouse School from 1868 to 1874, and Exeter College, Oxford, where he graduated as B.A. in 1878 and M.A. in 1885.

== Football career ==
Parry played three times for England, against Wales in 1879 and 1882 and Scotland in 1882. He scored once.

He was captain (and goal-scorer) of the Old Carthusians team which won the 1881 FA Cup Final defeating Old Etonians 3–0. He was the first overseas-born captain of an FA Cup winning team, and the last until Irishman Johnny Carey with Manchester United in 1948 (and not Eric Cantona 48 years later).

He was also a member of the Wanderers club as well as for Swifts of Slough, Remnants, Windsor, and Stoke Poges FC clubs.

== Later life ==
Parry became a schoolmaster at Felsted School in 1879 before settling at Stoke House private school, Stoke Poges, Buckinghamshire in 1881, becoming its head master in 1892 and retiring in 1918. He was national chairman of the Private Schools Association in 1907 and sat on its council for many years. After his retirement, he helped to run the Officers' Family Fund for sons of officers who died in the recent First World War.

Parry became blind in his later years and died at his last home in West Bridgford, Nottingham on 19 July 1931, aged seventy-six. He was buried at the parish church at Plumtree, Nottinghamshire.

== Honours ==
Oxford University

- FA Cup runner-up: 1877

Old Carthusians

- FA Cup winner: 1881

== International goals ==
Scores and results list England's goal tally first.

#	Date	Venue	Opponent	Score	Result	Competition
1	13 March 1882	Racecourse Ground, Wrexham	Wales	2–0	3–5	Friendly

== See also ==
- List of England international footballers born outside England
- List of FA Cup winning managers
