= Arthur Dunn =

English footballer (1860–1902)

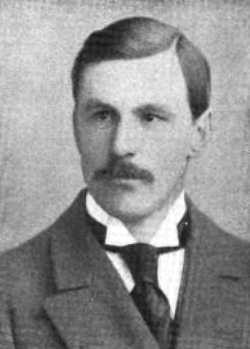
- In The Sketch, 13 February 1901

Personal information
- Full name: Arthur Tempest Blakiston Dunn
- Date of birth: 12 August 1860
- Place of birth: Whitby, England
- Date of death: 20 February 1902 (aged 41)
- Place of death: Ludgrove, Cockfosters, England
- Position: Forward

Senior career*
Years	Team	Apps	(Gls)
- Cambridge University
- Old Etonians
1886–1892	Corinthian		

International career
1883–1892	England	4	(2)
- * Club domestic league appearances and goals

Arthur Tempest Blakiston Dunn (12 August 1860 – 20 February 1902) was a noted amateur footballer who founded the English boarding school Ludgrove in 1892.

== Education ==
Dunn was born in Whitby, Yorkshire on 12 August 1860, the son of a Cambridge University mathematics professor. He was educated at Eton College, then entered Trinity College, Cambridge in 1880, graduating B.A. in 1884, and M.A. in 1887.

== Football career ==
Dunn played football for Eton College, and was a Cambridge University football blue in 1883 and 1884.

C.W. Alcock described Dunn, who usually played inside-left as "A good centreforward, rather light, but has plenty of pluck, and is a sure shot at goal", and "has great pace, and both dribbles and middles well". Later in his playing career he moved into defence, appearing as right-back at both his England international appearances in 1892.

Dunn played in two FA Cup Finals for Old Etonians, contributing a pass to William Anderson for the only goal, thus winning the trophy 1–0 in 1882 against Blackburn Rovers, and being a runner-up in 1883 when his team lost 2–1 to Blackburn Olympic in extra time. During the latter game he went off with a knee injury early in the second half, an incident that many believed cost his side the cup, as with no substitutes allowed in those days the Old Etonians had to play on with ten men. Both finals were played at Kennington Oval.

He played four times for England, starting with a 7–0 thrashing of Ireland at Liverpool on 24 February 1883 during which he scored twice. Almost exactly a year later he played against Ireland again as England this time won 8–1 in Belfast. His third cap came on 5 March 1892 in a 2–0 victory over Wales at Wrexham, whilst his final international appearance was to end in a 4–1 win over Scotland at Ibrox Park, Glasgow, on 2 April the same year.

Dunn also appeared for the Corinthians between 1886 and 1892, and the Granta football club, as well as representing London, Cambridgeshire and Norfolk, and The South versus The North.

== Other sports ==
Dunn was also an active cricketer at Minor County level with appearances for Norfolk from 1886 and Hertfordshire in 1898, and was a member of the Free Foresters. He also played ice hockey.

== Educational career ==
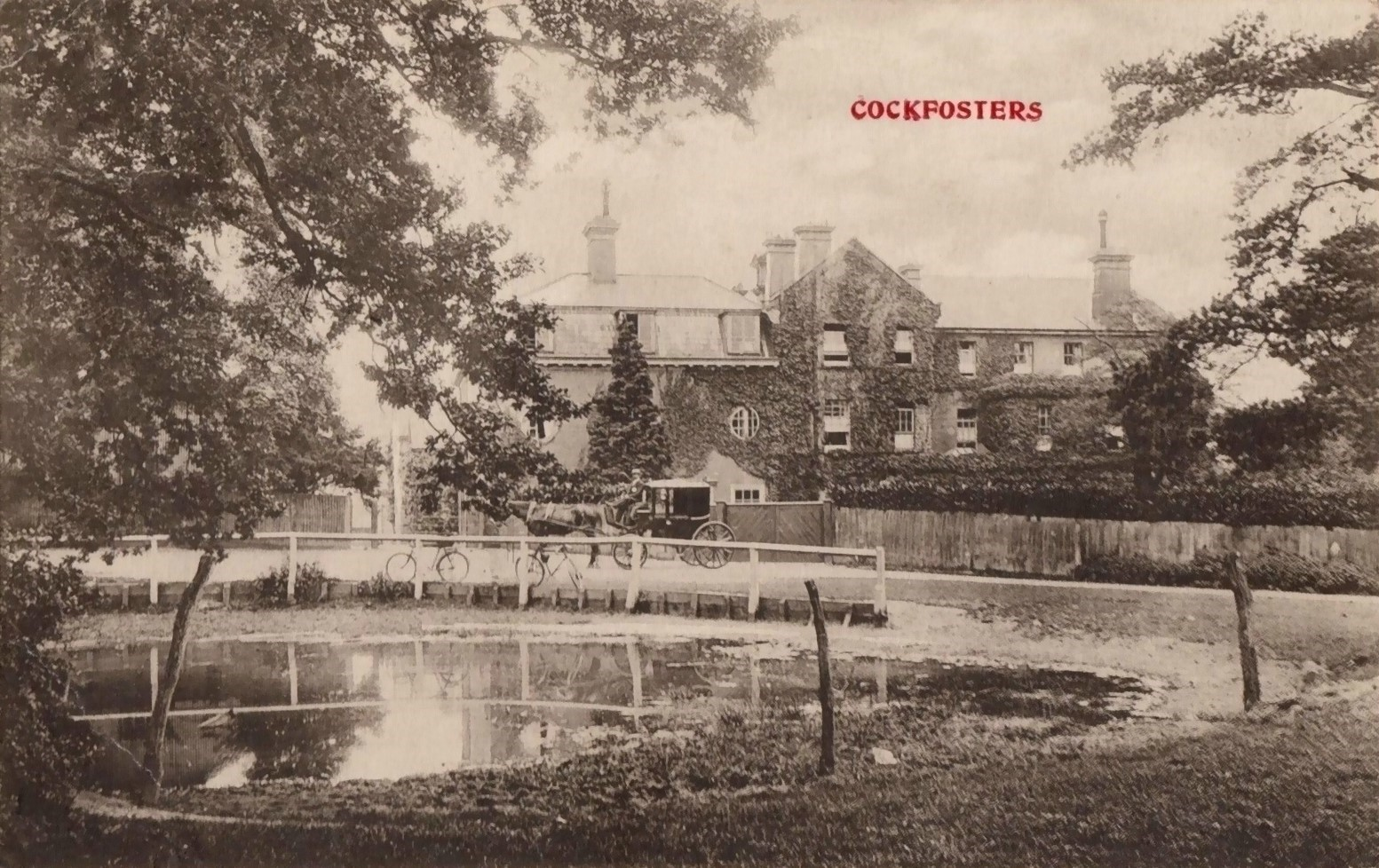
Ludgrove Hall on a postcard of around 1900

Dunn started teaching as tutor to the Dunville family in Ireland in 1884–85. He was a master at Elstree School, Hertfordshire, from 1885 to 1892. In May 1892 he opened his own preparatory school, Ludgrove, at Ludgrove Hall, Cockfosters, near Barnet where he remained as headmaster until his death.

== Death and legacy ==
He died in his sleep in Ludgrove on 20 February 1902 at the young age of 41. In the week preceding his death, he had refereed a football match between Ludgrove's own XI and Oxford University and played hockey on the ice at Trent Park near the school, when he complained of tiredness. On the day he died he had visited the House of Commons with M.P. Colonel William Kenyon-Slaney, whose son was then a pupil at Ludgrove. He was buried at Little Shelford, Cambridgeshire, where he was brought up.

Dunn left a widow and three children. His youngest daughter, Olive Mary, became an author, by the name of Mary Dunn (writer), and also wrote for the satirical magazine Punch. His only son, John H. M. Dunn, became a 2nd Lieutenant with the Royal Field Artillery and was killed in action in the First World War on the Somme in September 1916. His eldest daughter, Marjorie Florence, was awarded an MBE in 1920 for her work with the Red Cross during that war. His wife Helen outlived him by 26 years and died in 1949 aged 81.

After his death the Arthur Dunn Cup was instituted in his memory, based on an idea he proposed shortly before his death. This is a football competition for "Old Boys" teams of various leading public schools, and was first competed for in the 1902–03 season.

== Sporting honours ==
Old Etonians

- F.A. Cup Final 1882 - winner.
- F.A. Cup Final 1883 - runner-up.
