= Fred Hargreaves =

English footballer and cricketer

Personal information
- Full name: Frederick William Hargreaves
- Date of birth: 16 August 1858
- Place of birth: Blackburn, England
- Date of death: 5 April 1897 (aged 38)
- Place of death: Wilpshire, England
- Position: Half-back

Senior career*
Years	Team	Apps	(Gls)
- Blackburn Rovers

International career
1880–1882	England	3	(0)
- * Club domestic league appearances and goals

Frederick William Hargreaves (16 August 1858 – 5 April 1897) was an English footballer who represented the England national team. He also played first-class cricket for Lancashire.

A member of the Malvern College 1st XI team, Hargreaves played his club football for the Blackburn Rovers and was a half-back in their team which lost the 1882 FA Cup Final. His first international cap for England came in 1880 when he took the field against Wales, with England winning 3–2. The following year he made another appearance in an international match against Wales but this time he finished on the losing side. In 1882, he claimed his third and final cap in a convincing 13–0 victory over Ireland. As of January 2013, this remains England's highest ever winning margin.

His brother John Hargreaves also played at Blackburn and represented England.

An amateur cricketer who was previously a member of Malvern's First Eleven Cricket team, he appeared in his only first-class cricket match in 1881, against Derbyshire. Hargreaves was dismissed by George Osborne for a duck in his only innings and took a couple of catches. He played club cricket at Blackburn's East Lancashire Cricket Club.
