= William Anderson (English footballer) =

English footballer and cattle rancher

Personal information
- Full name: William Joseph Anderson
- Date of birth: 12 August 1861
- Place of birth: Liverpool, England
- Date of death: 23 June 1903 (aged 41)
- Place of death: Braamfontein, South Africa
- Position: Right winger

Youth career
- Eton College

Senior career*
Years	Team	Apps	(Gls)
1879–84	Old Etonians		
- * Club domestic league appearances and goals

William Joseph Anderson (12 August 1861 – 23 June 1903) was an English amateur footballer who played as a forward for Old Etonians. He was the first Liverpool-born footballer to win the FA Cup.

== Early life and education ==
Anderson was born in Liverpool, the youngest son of Thomas Darnley Anderson, a Scots-born cotton merchant, and educated at Eton College. In 1880 he was admitted as a student at Trinity Hall, Cambridge; his brother Rupert had preceded him by a year. Despite his undoubted football ability, Anderson never received a Blue.

== Football career ==
Anderson represented Eton College in 1879 and made his debut for the Old Etonians against Gitanos the same year. His first competitive match came in the Old Etonians' 10–0 win at Brentwood in the first round of the 1880–81 FA Cup, playing as one of the two right-wingers, and making one of the goals by putting in a cross-shot turned in by Herbert Whitfeld. He scored his first goal in the 3–0 win over Herts Rangers in the third round.

He played in the final against the Old Carthusians and came closest of the Etonians to scoring, a "splendid shot" of his being "only just saved" by Leonard Gillett in the O.C.'s goal, but the Etonians went down 3–0.

He had more success in the 1881–82 FA Cup, playing in every round, and scored the only goal in the final against Blackburn Rovers, shooting just inside the post in the first ten minutes. He made it three consecutive finals by playing for the Etonians in their defeat to Blackburn Olympic the following season, and his last game in the competition came in the Etonians' surprise defeat at Hendon in the first round in 1883–84.

== Post-football career ==
By 1886, Anderson had moved to Montana as a cattle rancher, and in 1893 founded the Livingston, Independence and Cooke City Telephone Company. His keen involvement in pursuing thieves included his presence at the arrest of Butch Cassidy in 1892.

After his brother Charles left him a large estate in 1893, he began to spend more time in Europe than the United States, finally emigrating back to Britain in 1896. In 1899, he enlisted to fight in the Boer War, but resigned his commission as lieutenant in Thorneycroft's Mounted Infantry after only seven months, and died on 23 June 1903, older brother Rupert being his heir and executor.

== Footballing honours ==
- FA Cup winner: 1882
- Runner-up: 1881, 1883
