= 1882 FA Cup final =

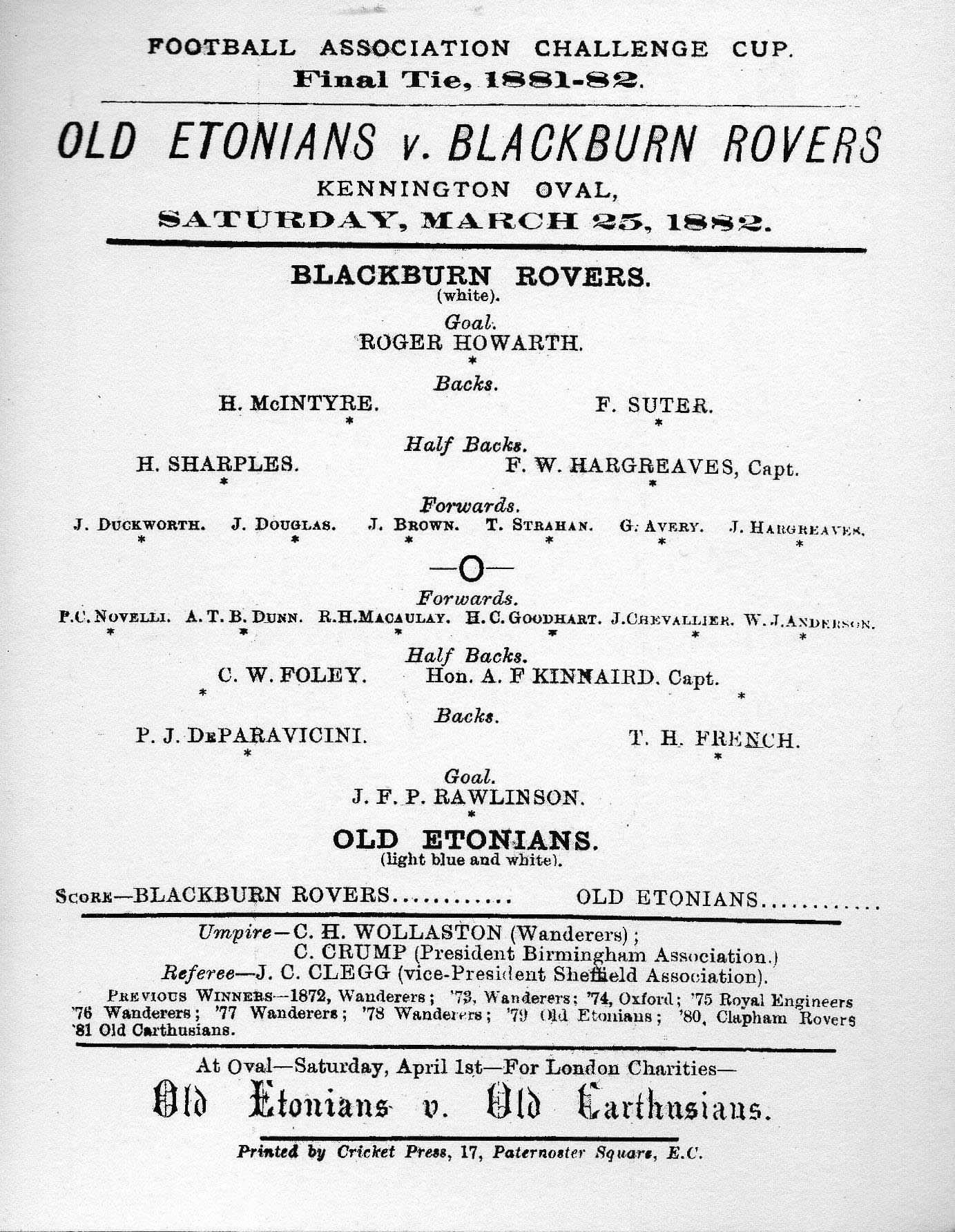
- Official match programme
- Event: 1881–82 FA Cup
Old Etonians	Blackburn Rovers
1	0
- Date: 25 March 1882
- Venue: Kennington Oval, London
- Referee: Charles Clegg
- Attendance: 6,500

The 1882 FA Cup final was contested by Old Etonians and Blackburn Rovers at the Kennington Oval. Old Etonians won 1–0, the only goal scored, according to most reports, by William Anderson, although another, questionably, gives Reginald Macaulay. It was the last final to be won by one of the Southern "gentleman amateur" teams who had dominated the first decade of the competition.

== Summary ==
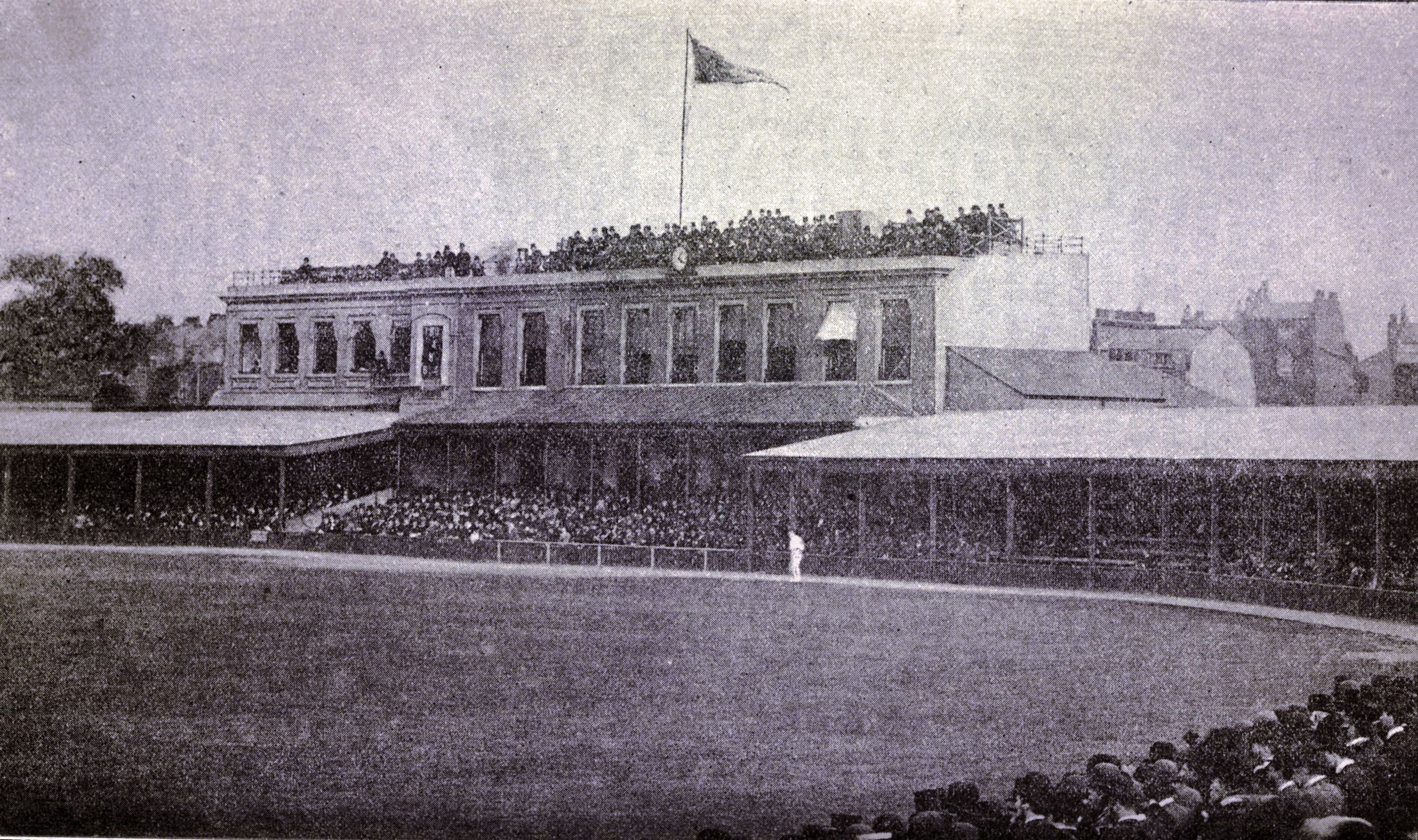
Kennington Oval (here pictured in 1891) was the match venue

In the final, played at Kennington Oval on 25 March 1882, the Old Etonians met Blackburn Rovers, who were the first team from outside London and the Home counties to appear in an FA Cup final. Blackburn included England internationals, Fred Hargreaves and his brother, John, and Jimmy Brown. Owing to the clash of the club's regular colours, Rovers wore "something very much like" the Darwen hoops in dark blue and white, while the Etonians wore their light blue and white colours in a "harlequin" (i.e. quartered) design.

The Old Boys dominated the early stages of the match but Rovers defended well until, according to the match report in Gibbons' "Association Football in Victorian England", "following an expert through ball by Dunn, Macaulay steered the ball between the Blackburn goalposts to secure a well-deserved half-time lead". However, a tribute in The Times (1937) states Macaulay was fond of recalling he outpaced the Blackburn players and helped towards the goal, without claiming to have scored it. Other reports identify the scorer differently: Bell's Life in London, The Field and The Times stated it was Anderson, the first two detailing the ball had been successively passed to him by Macaulay and Dunn, while The Sporting Life stated the ball was centred "to the front of the posts" by Novelli before it was kicked "out of a brief and loose bully" (i.e. a scrimmage) by an unnamed player.

Also varied is the time at which the goal was reportedly scored: eight minutes from the start by Bell's Life, ten minutes by The Sportsman, and "a quarter of an hour's play" by The Sporting Life.

The Old Etonians were able to prevent Blackburn from scoring in the second half, thus claiming the cup for the second time in three years.

== Match details ==
1881–82 FA Cup
25 March 1882

Old Etonians	1–0	Blackburn Rovers
Anderson	Report

Kennington Oval, London
Attendance: 6,500
Referee: Charles Clegg

Old Etonians	Blackburn Rovers

GK	(England) John Rawlinson
RB	(England) Thomas French
LB	(England) Percy de Paravicini
RH	(Scotland) Hon. Arthur Kinnaird
LH	(England) Charles Foley
OR	(England) William Anderson
IR	(England) John Barrington Chevallier
CF	(England) Harry Goodhart
CF	(England) Reginald Macaulay
IL	(England) Arthur Dunn
OL	(England) Philip Novelli

GK	(England) Roger Howarth
RB	(Scotland) Hugh McIntyre
LB	(Scotland) Fergus Suter
RH	(England) Harry Sharples
LH	(England) Fred Hargreaves
OR	(England) John Duckworth
IR	(Scotland) Jimmy Douglas
CF	(England) James Brown
CF	(England) Thomas Strachan
IL	(England) Geoffrey Avery
OL	(England) John Hargreaves

== Aftermath ==
In May 2013 a programme from the game sold at auction at Sotheby's for £35,250, a world record for a football programme.

== Bibliography ==
- "The Association Challenge Cup-Final Tie", Manchester Guardian, 27 March 1882
