= Old Etonians F.C. =

Association football club in England

Coordinates: 51°29′42″N 0°35′49″W

Old Etonians
- Full name: Old Etonians Association Football Club
- Nickname: Oldens
- Founded: c. 1865; 161 years ago
- Ground: Mesopotamia; Pococks Lane; Eton
- Capacity: 475
- Chairman: Jamie Scobie
- Manager: Iain Botterill
- League: Arthurian League Premier Division
- 2019: Arthurian League Premier Division, 3rd of 10
Home colours

The Old Etonians Association Football Club is an English association football club whose players are alumni of Eton College, in Eton, Berkshire.

Having been a member of The Football Association and played several editions of the FA Cup, Old Etonians currently play in the Premier Division, the highest level of the Arthurian League.

== History ==
The first reference to football clubs consisting of Old Etonians relates to matches between the former pupils at Oxford University and those at Cambridge University, starting in 1859. These matches were played to the Eton Field Game rules.

Sides made up of former pupils played annual matches against the school in the Field Game over the next few years. The first match for an Old Etonian side against non-Etonian opposition was at Westminster School in 1863, probably to that school's rules. At the start of 1866, an Old Etonian side, chosen by Arthur Kinnaird, drew with the Wanderers in an association match. Possibly in relation to preparations for this match, the Old Etonians in period gave the club's foundation date as 1865. (Note: Some sources set the date of foundation as 1865, however the Arthurian League website gives 1871. Nevertheless, the official club website stated that the club was "officially" founded in 1871 but suggests that it had been active as early as 1863.)

The Etonians entered the FA Cup for the first time in 1873–74. However, having been drawn to play High Wycombe, the club scratched; at this time, the best Old Etonians were playing for Wanderers in the competition. The following season, the club reached the final, beating Shropshire Wanderers at the Kennington Oval in the semi-final. The Countrymen were without their star half-back John Denning, and the Etonians won 1–0. The final against the Royal Engineers went to a replay. At the time, ends were only changed after each goal; the original match had a stiff breeze, and the Old Etonians had it at their backs for all but the five minutes when the Sappers were 1–0 behind. The law was changed as a result of the unfairness. However, the Etonians were missing several key players for the replay, including Cuthbert Ottaway and William Kenyon-Slaney, and the Sappers won 2–0.

In 1875–76, the club reached the final again, and again suffered from injuries before a final replay, with Kinnaird and A.C. Thompson, amongst others, missing from the original match. This time the opponents were the Wanderers, whose 3–0 win persuaded the Etonians that the Wanderers was still the better option to play for in the Cup, and the Old Etonians did not enter for the next two years. The club was brought back to prominence in 1878 under the auspices of Francis Marindin, an Old Etonian who had played for the Engineers.

When the club did enter next, however, in 1878–79, there was a sea-change. The growth of other clubs and "old boy" teams starting up encouraged the Etonians to play for the old school club rather than the Wanderers, so, when the clubs were drawn together in the first round, prominent Wanderers Kinnaird and Edgar Lubbock switched their loyalties from the Cup holders to the Etonians, and Marindin took over in goal. The Etonians were also bolstered by Cambridge undergraduates opting for the Etonians rather than the university, whose first round tie kicked off at one end of the Kennington Oval shortly before the Etonians v Wanderers match kicked off at the other. The Etonians beat the Wanderers 7–2, and went on to win the Cup for the first time; Marindin had to miss the final through illness, and the game was of poor quality, but the Etonians scored the only goal of the game, after a Goodhart run down the left wing saw him cross for Clerke to shoot under the bar. In 1879–80, the Etonians beat the Wanderers in the third round, which proved to be the effective death knell for the Wanderers as their players abandoned the more cosmopolitan club for their specific old school sides.

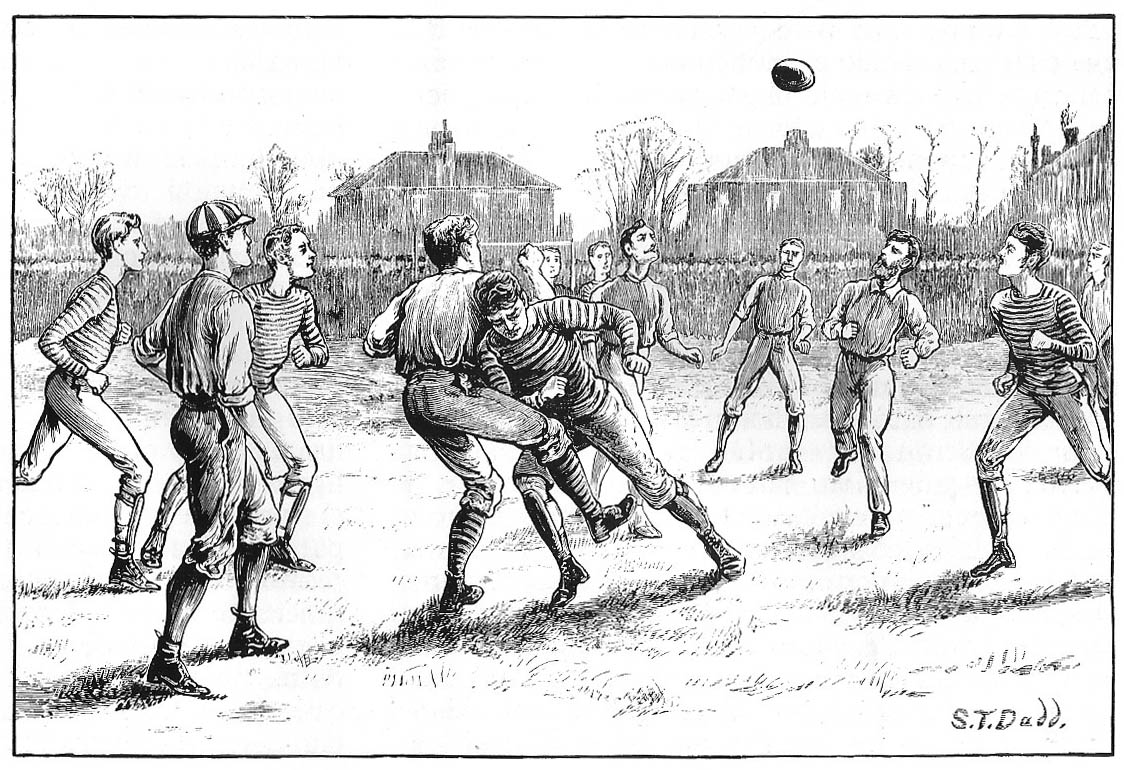
Depiction of a match between Old Etonians and Blackburn Rovers, c. 1882

The Old Etonians were the last amateur or "true blue" club to win the FA Cup on 25 March 1882 when they beat Blackburn Rovers 1–0 at The Oval with a goal from William Anderson. They lost 2–1 after extra time to another Blackburn club, Blackburn Olympic, the following year.

In all, they reached the final six times in nine years between 1875 and 1883, winning twice. They also supplied a number of players for the England team, including three in one match against Wales in 1879.

Old Etonians' last participation in the FA Cup main rounds was the 1887–88 edition, ending in the second round with a 6–0 defeat at Nottingham Forest. The club continued to enter the qualifying rounds until 1892–93, its last Cup tie being a 4–2 defeat at Luton Town in the second qualifying round. The FA Amateur Cup started in 1893–94 and the Etonians transferred their affections to that competition, losing to the Sherwood Foresters in the quarter-final at the ground of Polytechnic; it was their best run in the competition, the last entry coming in 1901–02.

In modern times, Old Etonians are members of the Arthurian League (affiliated to the Amateur Football Alliance) and field two teams there. The 1st XI have won the league's Premier Division title on two occasions.

== Colours ==
The club has always worn Eton blue-based jerseys or shirts, and white shorts.

== Ground ==
In its earliest days, the club did not have a specific and dedicated home venue. In the 1860s, it played "home" matches on Battersea Park. For its home FA Cup matches, it was able to use the Kennington Oval, and stayed as a London-based side in the 1900s, using the Forest Hill ground at Catford. By 1929 the club was playing at Eton.

== International players ==
Several Old Etonians players were capped for England, either while with the club or subsequently.

The following eight scholars played for England whilst with the club (with the number of caps received whilst registered with Old Etonians F.C.):

- Rupert Anderson (1 cap)
- Lindsay Bury (1 cap)
- Edward Christian (1 cap)
- Arthur Dunn (2 caps)
- Harry Goodhart (3 caps)
- Robert Cunliffe Gosling (5 caps)
- John Hawtrey (2 caps)
- Herbert Whitfeld (1 cap)

Anderson, Bury and Whitfeld made their only appearances together, on 18 January 1879 against Wales. Whitfeld scored in a 2–1 victory.

Other Old Etonians who later played for England include:

- Alexander Bonsor
- Percy de Paravicini
- Alfred Lyttelton
- Reginald Macaulay
- Cuthbert Ottaway
- John Frederick Peel Rawlinson

Club founder Lord Kinnaird made one appearance for Scotland in 1873, the second ever international match.

== Records ==
- Best FA Cup performance: Champions, 1878–79, 1881–82
- Best FA Amateur Cup performance: Quarter-finals, 1893–94, 1894–95

== Honours ==
- FA Cup
  - Winners (2): 1879, 1882
  - Runners-up (4): 1875, 1876, 1881, 1883
- Arthurian League
  - Premier Division Champions (2): 1992–93, 2004–05
  - Division One Champions (1): 1985–86
  - Division Two Champions (2nd XI) (4): 1992–93, 1997–98, 1999–2000, 2003–04
  - Division Three Champions (3rd XI) (2): 1995–96, 2004–05
  - Division Four Champions (4th XI) (2): 1989–90, 1993–94
- Arthur Dunn Cup
  - Winners (2): 2004–05, 2009–10

== Eton Ramblers F.C. ==
The Eton Ramblers cricket club, also made up of Old Etonians, occasionally played the existing students in the Eton Field Game in the cricket off-season. In 1882–83 the Ramblers also entered the FA Cup, being drawn at home to Romford in the first round. The tie was played at the ground of Windsor Home Park F.C. and the Ramblers won 6–2.

In the second round, the club lost 7–0 to the Old Carthusians, this time playing on the Brocas at Eton College itself. Because of a lack of regulation footballs, the tie was played using an Eton Field Game ball, which was much smaller than the Association standard.

The club remained active until at least 1902, by which time the club was based at the Prince Albert, on Plumstead Common.

The Ramblers' colours have been purple, gold, green, and red since 1863.
