= Old Carthusians F.C. =

Association football club in England

Coordinates: 51°11′41″N 0°37′48″W

Old Carthusians
- Full name: Old Carthusians Football Club
- Founded: 1876; 150 years ago
- Ground: Charterhouse School; Playing fields
- League: Arthurian League Premier Division
- 2019–20: Arthurian League Premier Division, 1st (champions)
Home colours

Old Carthusians Football Club is an association football club whose players are former pupils of Charterhouse School in Godalming, Surrey, England. The club was established in 1876 and won the FA Cup in 1881, as well as the FA Amateur Cup in 1894 and 1897. The club currently plays in the Arthurian League and have won the 'double' of league and Arthur Dunn Cup in 2006, 2008, 2009, 2011, 2013, 2014, 2015, 2017 and 2019.

== History ==
The club was formed from the former pupils of Charterhouse School in Godalming, Surrey, during 1876. Reports in the press of games taking place at the school had appeared since March 1853 and Charterhouse had been one of the founding teams of The Football Association. It was one of several clubs formed from the old boys of public schools in England during the 19th century. Other clubs formed in similar circumstances include Old Etonians and Old Westminsters. Other former members of the school had previously founded Stoke-on-Trent F.C. in 1867, which would go on to be known as Stoke City. Old Carthusians entered the FA Cup for the first time in 1879–80. At the time of the founding of the Football League in 1888, Old Carthusians was the most southern team to be interested in joining the Northern dominated league, but were never added to the league. Old Carthusians became one of only four clubs to win the FA Cup in the first eleven years it was awarded when they won the trophy in 1881, defeating the aforementioned Old Etonians.

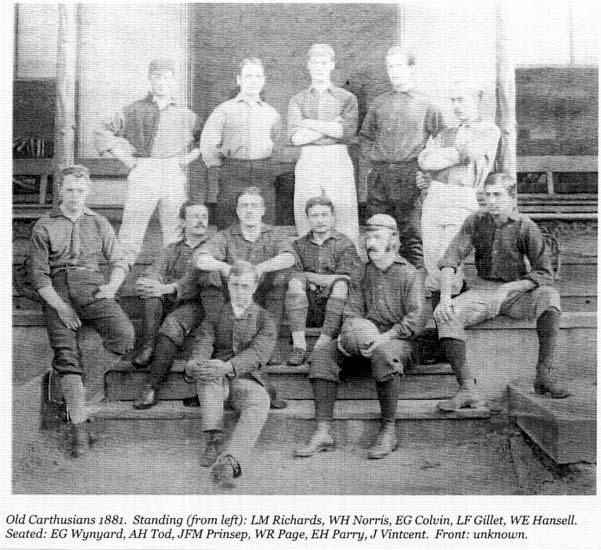
The Old Carthusians team of 1881, the same year in which the club won the FA Cup

In 1883, they reached the semi-finals once more, and lost to Blackburn Olympic in a game which marked a change in football during the late 19th century away from the old boys clubs that had been so successful over the game's first real decade, to that of the working man's clubs. In comparison, while the Carthusians were made up of educated men, the professions of the players among the Olympic side included a dentist, a plumber, iron-foundry workers and three weavers. The Athletic News promoted the game as "patricians" versus "plebeians".

Following the introduction of the FA Amateur Cup in 1893, Old Carthusians won the title twice, in 1894 and 1897, and reached the final a total of three times out of the first four occasions in which it was awarded. Prior to the first final, where they defeated Casuals 2–1, an argument broke out over the use of penalties. An Old Carthusian spokesman said, "Penalties are an unpleasant indication that our conduct and honesty are not all it should be." In 1894 they were invited to join the newly formed Southern League along with a number of team including fellow old boys club Old Westminsters. The old boys teams refused to join the new league and tried to convince the 2nd Scots Guards to leave the league as well.

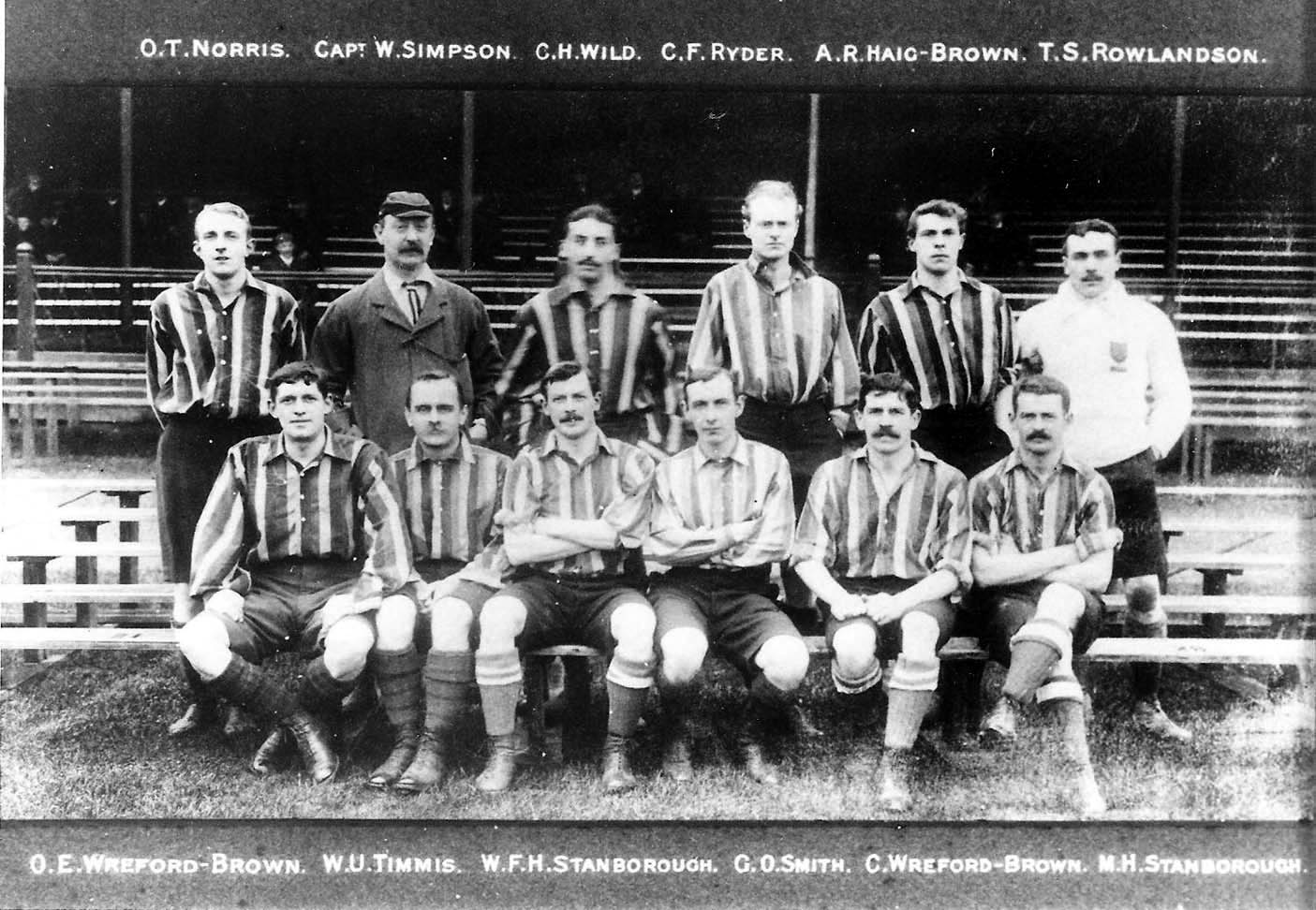
The team that won the Arthur Dunn Cup in 1903

Following the use of amateur sides as proving grounds for future professional players, the old boys clubs became isolated and broke away from the FA Amateur Cup to form the Arthur Dunn Cup in 1902–03. As of 2012, the club continues to enter the Arthur Dunn Cup, and reached the final during the competition's centenary in 2002–03, being defeated by Old Salopians. This was a replay of the very first title in 1903, when the Carthusians and Salopians shared the title after a drawn replay. By the time of the centenary, the Old Carthusians were the most successful team in the competition having won it on 19 occasions out of 24 finals reached and have since gone on to win it a further 5 times, making it 24 occasions out of 30 finals reached.

During 2008, the club took part in a tournament featuring several former winners of the FA Cup including Royal Engineers and Old Etonians.

Along with Wimbledon, and Royal Engineers the Old Carthusians are one of only three teams to have ever won both the FA Cup and the FA Amateur Cup.

In 2011 the Old Carthusians reached the final of the AFA Senior Cup, a historic achievement for a 'closed club'. However, having been two goals up at half time, they went on to lose the game to the Old Salesians 3–2. Old Carthusians went on to win another two Arthurian League title and Arthur Dunn Cup doubles.

Following their 1–0 win over long-time rivals Lancing Old Boys in the 2015 Arthur Dunn Cup Final, the Old Carthusians made Arthurian League history by finally winning the 'Treble-Double' – winning the Arthurian League Premier Division and the Arthur Dunn Cup in the same year for three successive years. The 'Treble-Double' had only been achieved by one team before – Lancing Old Boys in the 1980s. The Old Carthusians, however, added an additional trophy to the traditional 'Double' in each such year by also winning the Jim Dixson Trophy, meaning that the Old Carthusians had eclipsed the Lancing Old Boys team of the 1980s and achieved the unique accolade of having won the 'Treble-Treble'.

== Colours ==
The club originally played in pink and dark blue, but added cerise in 1885.

== England internationals ==
Nine Old Carthusians were capped for England.

The full list of England players (with the number of caps received whilst registered with Old Carthusians F.C.) is:

- Andrew Amos (2 caps)
- William Cobbold (3 caps)
- Walter Gilliat (1 cap)
- Edward Hagarty Parry (3 caps)
- Gilbert Oswald Smith (20 caps)
- Maurice Stanbrough (1 cap)
- Arthur Melmoth Walters (9 caps)
- Percy Melmoth Walters (13 caps)
- Charles Wreford-Brown (3 caps)

== Titles ==
- FA Cup: 1

1880–81

- FA Amateur Cup: 2

1894, 1897

- Arthur Dunn Cup: 30

1903, 1904, 1905, 1906, 1908, 1910, 1921, 1922, 1923, 1936, 1939, 1947, 1949, 1951, 1954, 1962, 1977, 1982, 2001, 2006, 2008, 2009, 2011, 2013, 2014, 2015, 2017, 2018, 2019, 2020

- Amateur Football Alliance Senior Cup: 1

2019

- Arthurian League: 15

1979, 1982, 1988, 2006, 2008, 2009, 2011, 2012, 2013, 2014, 2015, 2017, 2019, 2022

- London Senior Cup: 4

1894–95, 1895–96, 1896–97, 1898–99

== Bibliography ==
- Dunning, Eric (2005). Barbarians, Gentlemen and Players. London; New York: Routledge. ISBN 978-0-7146-8290-7.
- Gilnert, Ed (2008). London Football Companion. London: Bloomsbury. ISBN 978-0-7475-9516-8.
