= List of FA Cup–winning managers =

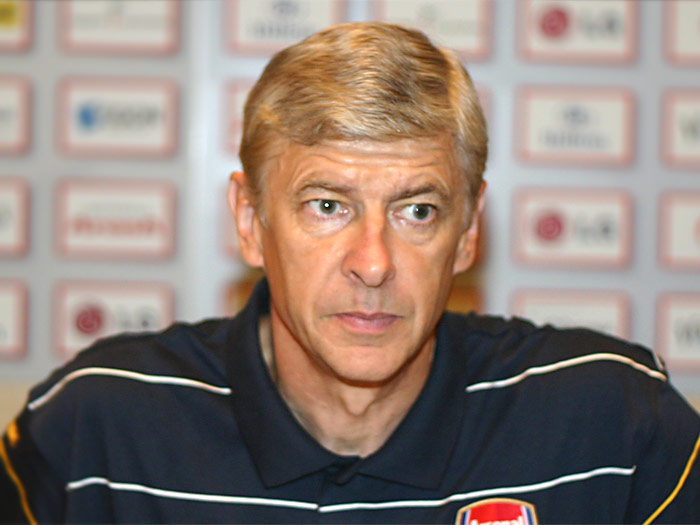
Arsène Wenger won the tournament a record seven times.

The FA Cup, the oldest association football competition in the world, is a knockout tournament contested between teams in domestic English football since 1871. Winning the competition was previously seen as an equal achievement to winning the league championship, but the growing importance of the Premier League and UEFA Champions League has seen its importance diminish. Managers, particularly those at Premier League clubs, tend to make tactical changes in the FA Cup and rotate their squads, owing to fixture congestion caused by rival competitions such as the Premier League and European tournaments.

Arsène Wenger won seven FA Cups as manager of Arsenal, the most of any manager. George Ramsay won six FA Cups as manager of Aston Villa, while Alex Ferguson won five FA Cups as manager of Manchester United. Four managers have won the FA Cup as a player-manager. John Cameron was the first to do so in the 1901 final, a game in which he scored. Kenny Dalglish won two FA Cups as a player-manager in 1986 and 1989, and Ruud Gullit was player-manager when Chelsea won the 1997 final. Two managers have won the title with multiple sides: Billy Walker won as manager of Sheffield Wednesday in 1935 and Nottingham Forest in 1959, and Herbert Chapman won as manager of Huddersfield Town in 1922 and Arsenal in 1930. Joe Mercer was the first person to win the FA Cup as a captain and a manager; captaining Arsenal to victory in 1950, and managing Manchester City to a victory in 1969.

English managers have won the competition the most, with 76 wins by 50 different managers. Scottish managers are next with 32 wins by 17 different managers, and French managers are third with eight wins by two managers. Harry Redknapp was the last English manager to win the FA Cup, when he led Portsmouth to victory in the 2008 final. Gullit became the first manager from outside the British Isles to win the FA Cup when he guided Chelsea to victory in 1997.

== FA Cup-winning managers ==
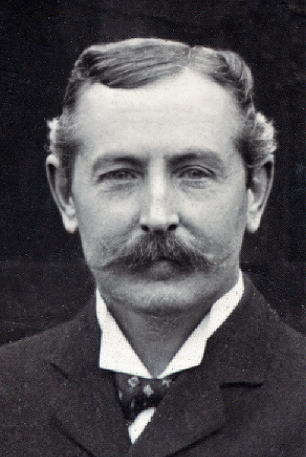
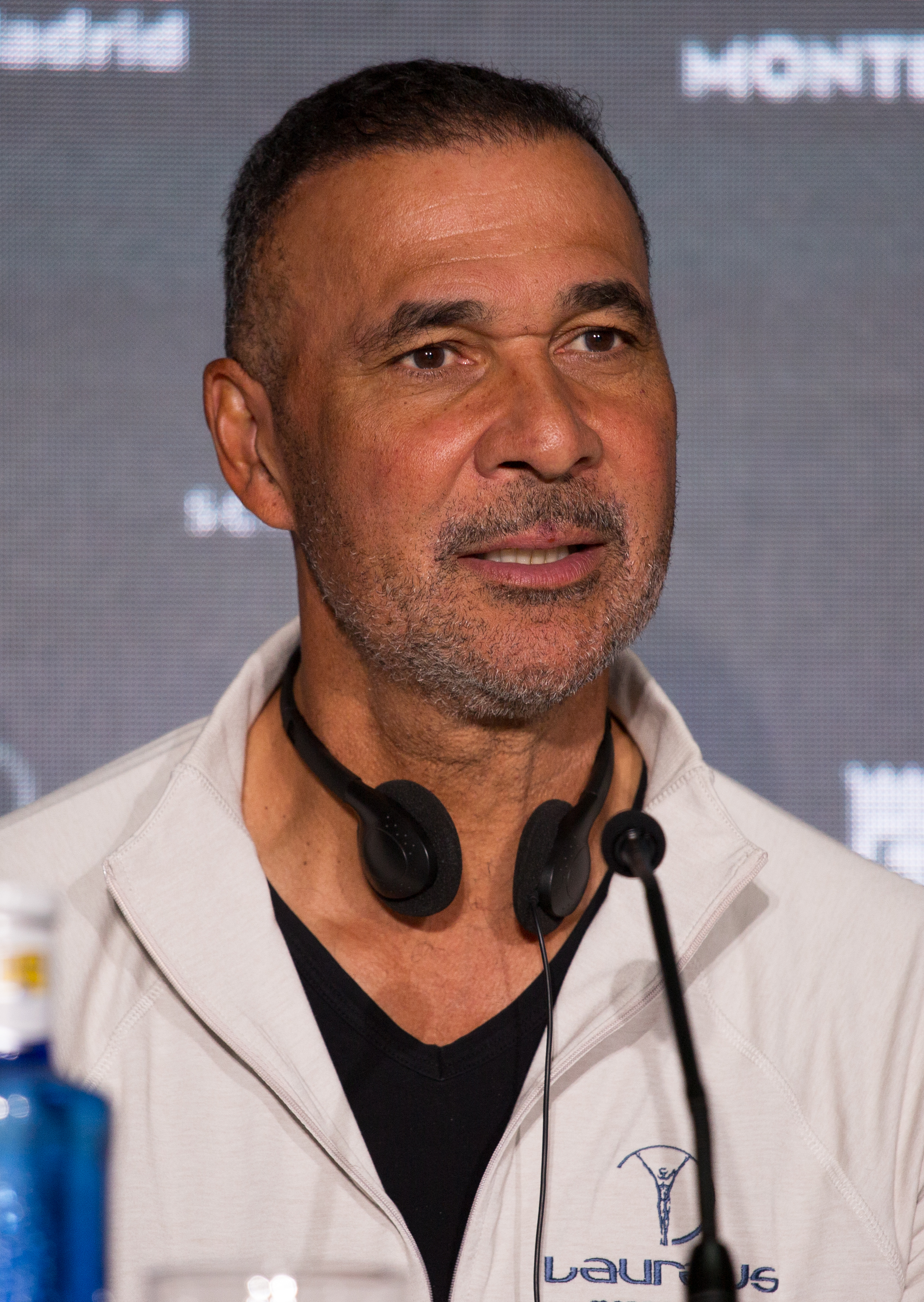
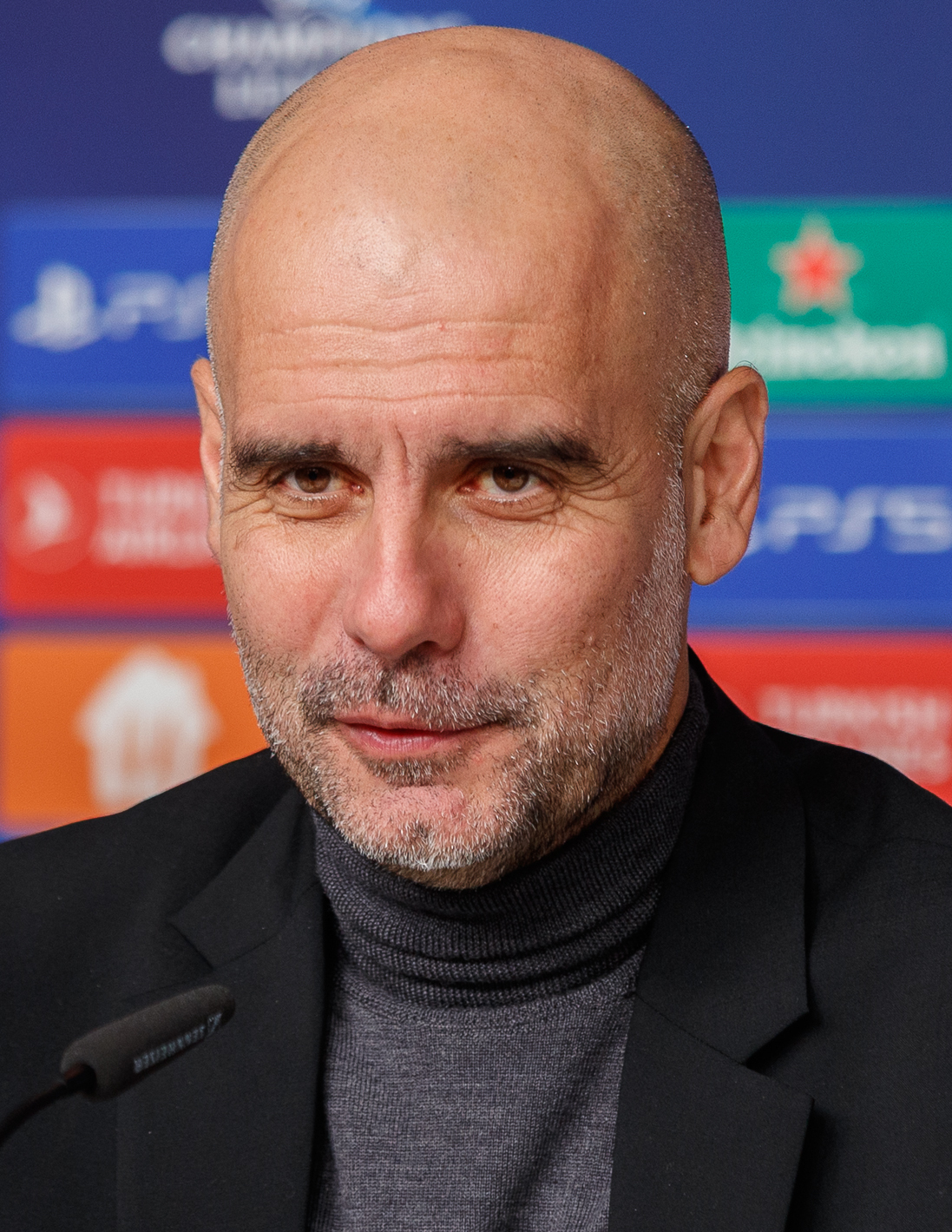
George Ramsay (left) won six FA Cups as manager of Aston Villa; Ruud Gullit (centre) was the first manager from outside the British Isles to win the tournament; Pep Guardiola (right) is the most recent manager to win the FA Cup.

FA Cup-winning managers
Final	Winning manager	Nationality	Club	Ref.
1872	— (Note: In the late 19th and early 20th centuries, clubs generally relied on selection committees rather than individuals with the dedicated role of manager.)	—	Wanderers	
1873	—	—	Wanderers	
1874	—	—	Oxford University	
1875	—	—	Royal Engineers	
1876	—	—	Wanderers	
1877	—	—	Wanderers	
1878	—	—	Wanderers	
1879	—	—	Old Etonians	
1880	—	—	Clapham Rovers	
1881	—	—	Old Carthusians	
1882	—	—	Old Etonians	
1883	Jack Hunter	England	Blackburn Olympic	
1884	James Fielding	England	Blackburn Rovers	
1885	James Fielding	England	Blackburn Rovers	
1886	James Fielding	England	Blackburn Rovers	
1887	George Ramsay	Scotland	Aston Villa	
1888	—	—	West Bromwich Albion	
1889	William Sudell	England	Preston North End	
1890	Thomas Mitchell	Scotland	Blackburn Rovers	
1891	Thomas Mitchell	Scotland	Blackburn Rovers	
1892	Louis Ford	England	West Bromwich Albion	
1893	Jack Addenbrooke	England	Wolverhampton Wanderers	
1894	Tom Harris	England	Notts County	
1895	George Ramsay	Scotland	Aston Villa	
1896	Arthur Dickinson	England	The Wednesday	
1897	George Ramsay	Scotland	Aston Villa	
1898	Harry Hallam	England	Nottingham Forest	
1899	John Nicholson	England	Sheffield United	
1900	Harry Spencer Hamer	England	Bury	
1901	John Cameron	Scotland	Tottenham Hotspur	
1902	John Nicholson	England	Sheffield United	
1903	Harry Spencer Hamer	England	Bury	
1904	Tom Maley	Scotland	Manchester City	
1905	George Ramsay	Scotland	Aston Villa	
1906	Will Cuff	England	Everton	
1907	Arthur Dickinson	England	The Wednesday	
1908	Jack Addenbrooke	England	Wolverhampton Wanderers	
1909	Ernest Mangnall	England	Manchester United	
1910	Frank Watt	Scotland	Newcastle United	
1911	Peter O'Rourke	Scotland	Bradford City	
1912	Arthur Fairclough	England	Barnsley	
1913	George Ramsay	Scotland	Aston Villa	
1914	John Haworth	England	Burnley	
1915	John Nicholson	England	Sheffield United	
1920	George Ramsay	Scotland	Aston Villa	
1921	Peter McWilliam	Scotland	Tottenham Hotspur	
1922	Herbert Chapman	England	Huddersfield Town	
1923	Charles Foweraker	England	Bolton Wanderers	
1924	Selection committee	—	Newcastle United	
1925	John Nicholson	England	Sheffield United	
1926	Charles Foweraker	England	Bolton Wanderers	
1927	Fred Stewart	England	Cardiff City	
1928	Bob Crompton	England	Blackburn Rovers	
1929	Charles Foweraker	England	Bolton Wanderers	
1930	Herbert Chapman	England	Arsenal	
1931	Fred Everiss	England	West Bromwich Albion	
1932	Andy Cunningham	Scotland	Newcastle United	
1933	Thomas H. McIntosh	England	Everton	
1934	Wilf Wild	England	Manchester City	
1935	Billy Walker	England	Sheffield Wednesday	
1936	George Allison	England	Arsenal	
1937	Johnny Cochrane	Scotland	Sunderland	
1938	James Taylor	England	Preston North End	
1939	Jack Tinn	England	Portsmouth	
1946	Stuart McMillan	England	Derby County	
1947	Jimmy Seed	England	Charlton Athletic	
1948	Matt Busby	Scotland	Manchester United	
1949	Stan Cullis	England	Wolverhampton Wanderers	
1950	Tom Whittaker	England	Arsenal	
1951	Stan Seymour	England	Newcastle United	
1952	Stan Seymour	England	Newcastle United	
1953	Joe Smith	England	Blackpool	
1954	Vic Buckingham	England	West Bromwich Albion	
1955	Doug Livingstone	Scotland	Newcastle United	
1956	Les McDowall	Scotland	Manchester City	
1957	Eric Houghton	England	Aston Villa	
1958	Bill Ridding	England	Bolton Wanderers	
1959	Billy Walker	England	Nottingham Forest	
1960	Stan Cullis	England	Wolverhampton Wanderers	
1961	Bill Nicholson	England	Tottenham Hotspur	
1962	Bill Nicholson	England	Tottenham Hotspur	
1963	Matt Busby	Scotland	Manchester United	
1964	Ron Greenwood	England	West Ham United	
1965	Bill Shankly	Scotland	Liverpool	
1966	Harry Catterick	England	Everton	
1967	Bill Nicholson	England	Tottenham Hotspur	
1968	Alan Ashman	England	West Bromwich Albion	
1969	Joe Mercer	England	Manchester City	
1970	Dave Sexton	England	Chelsea	
1971	Bertie Mee	England	Arsenal	
1972	Don Revie	England	Leeds United	
1973	Bob Stokoe	England	Sunderland	
1974	Bill Shankly	Scotland	Liverpool	
1975	John Lyall	England	West Ham United	
1976	Lawrie McMenemy	England	Southampton	
1977	Tommy Docherty	Scotland	Manchester United	
1978	Bobby Robson	England	Ipswich Town	
1979	Terry Neill	Northern Ireland	Arsenal	
1980	John Lyall	England	West Ham United	
1981	Keith Burkinshaw	England	Tottenham Hotspur	
1982	Keith Burkinshaw	England	Tottenham Hotspur	
1983	Ron Atkinson	England	Manchester United	
1984	Howard Kendall	England	Everton	
1985	Ron Atkinson	England	Manchester United	
1986	Kenny Dalglish	Scotland	Liverpool	
1987	John Sillett	England	Coventry City	
1988	Bobby Gould	England	Wimbledon	
1989	Kenny Dalglish	Scotland	Liverpool	
1990	Alex Ferguson	Scotland	Manchester United	
1991	Terry Venables	England	Tottenham Hotspur	
1992	Graeme Souness	Scotland	Liverpool	
1993	George Graham	Scotland	Arsenal	
1994	Alex Ferguson	Scotland	Manchester United	
1995	Joe Royle	England	Everton	
1996	Alex Ferguson	Scotland	Manchester United	
1997	Ruud Gullit	Netherlands	Chelsea	
1998	Arsène Wenger	France	Arsenal	
1999	Alex Ferguson	Scotland	Manchester United	
2000	Gianluca Vialli	Italy	Chelsea	
2001	Gérard Houllier	France	Liverpool	
2002	Arsène Wenger	France	Arsenal	
2003	Arsène Wenger	France	Arsenal	
2004	Alex Ferguson	Scotland	Manchester United	
2005	Arsène Wenger	France	Arsenal	
2006	Rafael Benítez	Spain	Liverpool	
2007	José Mourinho	Portugal	Chelsea	
2008	Harry Redknapp	England	Portsmouth	
2009	Guus Hiddink	Netherlands	Chelsea	
2010	Carlo Ancelotti	Italy	Chelsea	
2011	Roberto Mancini	Italy	Manchester City	
2012	Roberto Di Matteo	Italy	Chelsea	
2013	Roberto Martínez	Spain	Wigan Athletic	
2014	Arsène Wenger	France	Arsenal	
2015	Arsène Wenger	France	Arsenal	
2016	Louis van Gaal	Netherlands	Manchester United	
2017	Arsène Wenger	France	Arsenal	
2018	Antonio Conte	Italy	Chelsea	
2019	Pep Guardiola	Spain	Manchester City	
2020	Mikel Arteta	Spain	Arsenal	
2021	Brendan Rodgers	Northern Ireland	Leicester City	
2022	Jürgen Klopp	Germany	Liverpool	
2023	Pep Guardiola	Spain	Manchester City	
2024	Erik ten Hag	Netherlands	Manchester United	
2025	Oliver Glasner	Austria	Crystal Palace	
2026	Pep Guardiola	Spain	Manchester City	

=== By individual ===
FA Cup-winning managers by individual
Rank	Manager	Nationality	Wins	Winning Years	Club(s)
1	Arsène Wenger	France	7	1998, 2002, 2003, 2005, 2014, 2015, 2017	Arsenal
2	George Ramsay	Scotland	6	1887, 1895, 1897, 1905, 1913, 1920	Aston Villa
3	Alex Ferguson	Scotland	5	1990, 1994, 1996, 1999, 2004	Manchester United
4	John Nicholson	England	4	1899, 1902, 1915, 1925	Sheffield United
5	Charles Foweraker	England	3	1923, 1926, 1929	Bolton Wanderers
5	Bill Nicholson	England	3	1961, 1962, 1967	Tottenham Hotspur
5	Pep Guardiola	Spain	3	2019, 2023, 2026	Manchester City
9	Thomas Mitchell	Scotland	2	1890, 1891	Blackburn Rovers
9	Jack Addenbrooke	England	2	1893, 1908	Wolverhampton Wanderers
9	Arthur Dickinson	England	2	1896, 1907	The Wednesday
9	Harry Spencer Hamer	England	2	1900, 1903	Bury
9	Frank Watt	Scotland	2	1910, 1924	Newcastle United
9	Herbert Chapman	England	2	1922, 1930	Huddersfield Town, Arsenal
9	Billy Walker	England	2	1935, 1959	Sheffield Wednesday, Nottingham Forest
9	Matt Busby	Scotland	2	1948, 1963	Manchester United
9	Stan Cullis	England	2	1949, 1960	Wolverhampton Wanderers
9	Stan Seymour	England	2	1951, 1952	Newcastle United
9	Bill Shankly	Scotland	2	1965, 1974	Liverpool
9	John Lyall	England	2	1975, 1980	West Ham United
9	Keith Burkinshaw	England	2	1981, 1982	Tottenham Hotspur
9	Ron Atkinson	England	2	1983, 1985	Manchester United
9	Kenny Dalglish	Scotland	2	1986, 1989	Liverpool

=== By nationality ===
FA Cup-winning managers by nationality
Rank	Country	Managers	Total
1	England	52	70
2	Scotland	20	13
3	France	2	8
4	Spain	4	6
5	Italy	5	5
6	Netherlands	4	4
7	Northern Ireland	2	2
8	Germany	1	1
8	Portugal	1	1
8	Austria	1	1

== See also ==
- History of the FA Cup
- List of FA Cup finals

== Bibliography ==
- Collett, Mike (2003). The Complete Record of the FA Cup. London: SportsBooks Limited. ISBN 978-1-89980-719-2.
- Cox, Richard; Russell, Dave; Vamplew, Wray (2020). Encyclopedia of British Football. London: Frank Cass Publishers. ISBN 978-0-7146-8230-3.
- Hutchings, Steve; Nawrat, Chris (1995). The Sunday Times Illustrated History of Football: The Post-War Years. London: Chancellor Press. ISBN 1-85153-014-2.
- Motson, John (2005). Motson's FA Cup Odyssey. London: Pavilion Books. ISBN 1-86105-903-5.
- Slade, Michael J. (2013). The History of the English Football League: Part One:1888–1930. London: Strategic Book Publishing. ISBN 978-1-62516-183-3.
