= William Astley (footballer) =

English footballer

Personal information
- Full name: William Astley
- Date of birth: 16 October 1860
- Place of birth: Blackburn, Lancashire
- Date of death: 22 May 1939 (aged 78)
- Place of death: Blackburn
- Position: Right-half

Senior career*
Years	Team	Apps	(Gls)
1881–85	Blackburn Olympic		
- * Club domestic league appearances and goals

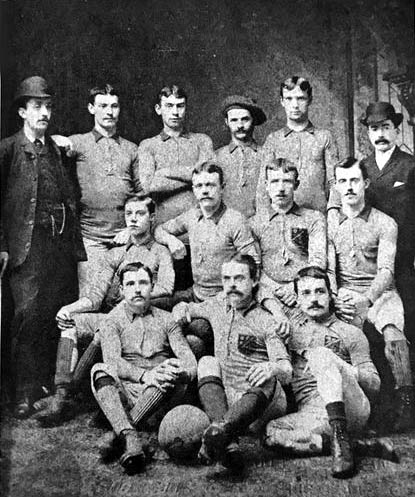
The Blackburn Olympic Cup-winning side in 1883. Astley is on the far right of the middle row, seated in front of his brother Alf

William Astley (16 October 1860 - 22 May 1939) was an association footballer who won the FA Cup as a player for Blackburn Olympic in 1883.

== Early life ==
Like most of his team-mates, Astley came from working-class stock, being the son of a butcher after whom he was named, and was employed as a weaver. William was the brother of Alf Astley, who had been a regular player for the Olympic, but by 1883 was coaching the side.

== Football career ==
Astley joined his older brother at Olympic in 1881, playing his first match for the club in a friendly against Liverpool A.F.C. in March, at full-back while Alf played ahead of him at half-back. Later that year, in the first round of the 1881–82 FA Cup, Astley made his competition debut; with Alf stepping back into a coaching role, Olympic tried out a new 1-2-2-6 formation, rather than the usual 2–2–6, with William one of the two "three-quarter" backs (alongside Tom Gibson) between the sole full-back Albert Warburton and the midfield. The formation did not work as Olympic went down 3–1 to Darwen.

The following season Olympic changed formation again to 2–3–5, moving Astley and Gibson to midfield, adding Jimmy Ward in defence alongside Warburton, and recruiting Jack Hunter as the pivot in centre-midfield. This formula instantly paid dividends as Olympic beat the fancied Accrington in the first round of the 1882–83 FA Cup, and indeed Astley was a regular in the side as it went all the way to the 1883 FA Cup final. In the final, the three-man midfield "repeatedly proved stumbling blocks" to opponents Old Etonians and Olympic won the Cup with a 2–1 victory. Astley kept his Cup-winners' medal on a watch-chain which he wore into his seventies.

It was the high point of his career, and that of Olympic. Astley played in the 1883 Lancashire Charity Cup final against the club's richer rival, Blackburn Rovers, and the Rovers claimed local honours with a 6–2 win. Astley also collected two runners-up medals in 1885, in both the Lancashire Senior Cup (beaten again by Rovers) and the Charity Cup (beaten by Accrington).

Astley had a one-off appearance in goal for Olympic in the first round of the 1884–85 FA Cup, which may have been something of an esprit du jeu, as Olympic brushed Oswaldtwisle Rovers aside by 12 goals to 0.

Astley was registered as a professional at the start of the 1885–86 season, as per the new regulations, but his career was almost at an end. His final match in the FA Cup was in the defeat to Church in the third round; he only played half of the match, as his knee gave way, and the ten-man Olympic went down 3–1. The injury - a recurrence of an old one - seems to have ended his career.

== Post-football ==
Astley married Betsy Boothman in Blackburn on 4 November 1879; the couple's son James was born the following year. After leaving the game, he became a newsagent in Brookhouse, and ran the Larkhall Inn public house from 1912 until his retirement in 1927. Astley died at the Blackburn Royal Infirmary on 22 May 1939.
