= 1883 FA Cup final =

Association football match

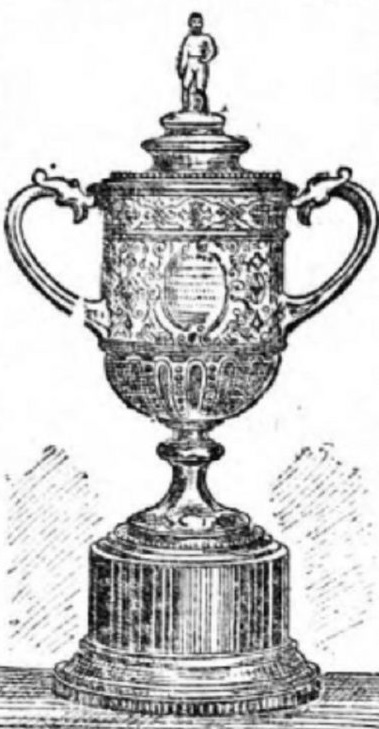
- An illustration of the FA Cup trophy awarded in 1883
- Event: 1882–83 FA Cup
Blackburn Olympic	Old Etonians
2	1
- After extra time
- Date: 31 March 1883
- Venue: Kennington Oval, London
- Referee: Charles Crump
- Attendance: 8,000

The 1883 FA Cup final was an association football match between Blackburn Olympic and Old Etonians on 31 March 1883 at Kennington Oval in London. It was the 12th final of the world's oldest football competition, the Football Association Challenge Cup (commonly known as the FA Cup). Old Etonians were the holders of the Cup, having defeated Olympic's local rivals, Blackburn Rovers, in the 1882 final. Blackburn Olympic had not previously progressed beyond the first round of the competition. Both teams had been victorious in six previous rounds to reach the final.

Old Etonians took the lead in the first half with a goal from Harry Goodhart, but Alfred Matthews scored an equaliser for Blackburn and, with the scores level at the end of the regulation 90 minutes, the game went into extra time, during which Blackburn's James Costley scored and Blackburn won the match 2–1. It was the first time that a working-class team had won the competition, which had previously been won exclusively by teams of wealthy amateurs. The victory intensified a debate over professionalism in football which had been ongoing since the previous decade; following threats by teams which wished to pay their players to break away and create a new governing body, professionalism in football was legalised in 1885 and the dominance of the gentleman amateurs quickly ended.

== Background ==
The Football Association Challenge Cup (commonly known as the FA Cup) was the first formal competition created for the sport of association football, which had first been codified in 1863. The creation of the tournament had been proposed in 1871 by Charles W. Alcock, the secretary of the Football Association (the FA), who wrote that "it is desirable that a Challenge Cup should be established in connection with the Association, for which all clubs belonging to the Association should be invited to compete". His inspiration had been a similar competition between houses during his time as a pupil at Harrow School. The first FA Cup competition took place during the 1871–72 season and 15 clubs entered. Wanderers won the final, defeating Royal Engineers, and Alcock himself was the winning captain.

In its early seasons, the competition was dominated by clubs which drew their players from the upper classes and were based in London and the surrounding area known as the home counties, particularly clubs set up for former pupils of England's leading public schools. By the 1880s, however, teams from working-class parts of the north of the country, especially the county of Lancashire, were gaining in strength. At the time, the FA was dominated by wealthy gentlemen who saw the sport primarily as a pastime and its rules did not allow clubs to pay their players anything other than minimal expenses. Despite this, working-class clubs, particularly those based in Lancashire, had been widely suspected of making illicit payments to players since at least 1876. Such clubs were also thought to have enticed potential players to relocate from other areas, especially Scotland, by colluding with local businessmen to arrange the provision of jobs which would involve minimal work and in reality pay them primarily for playing football.

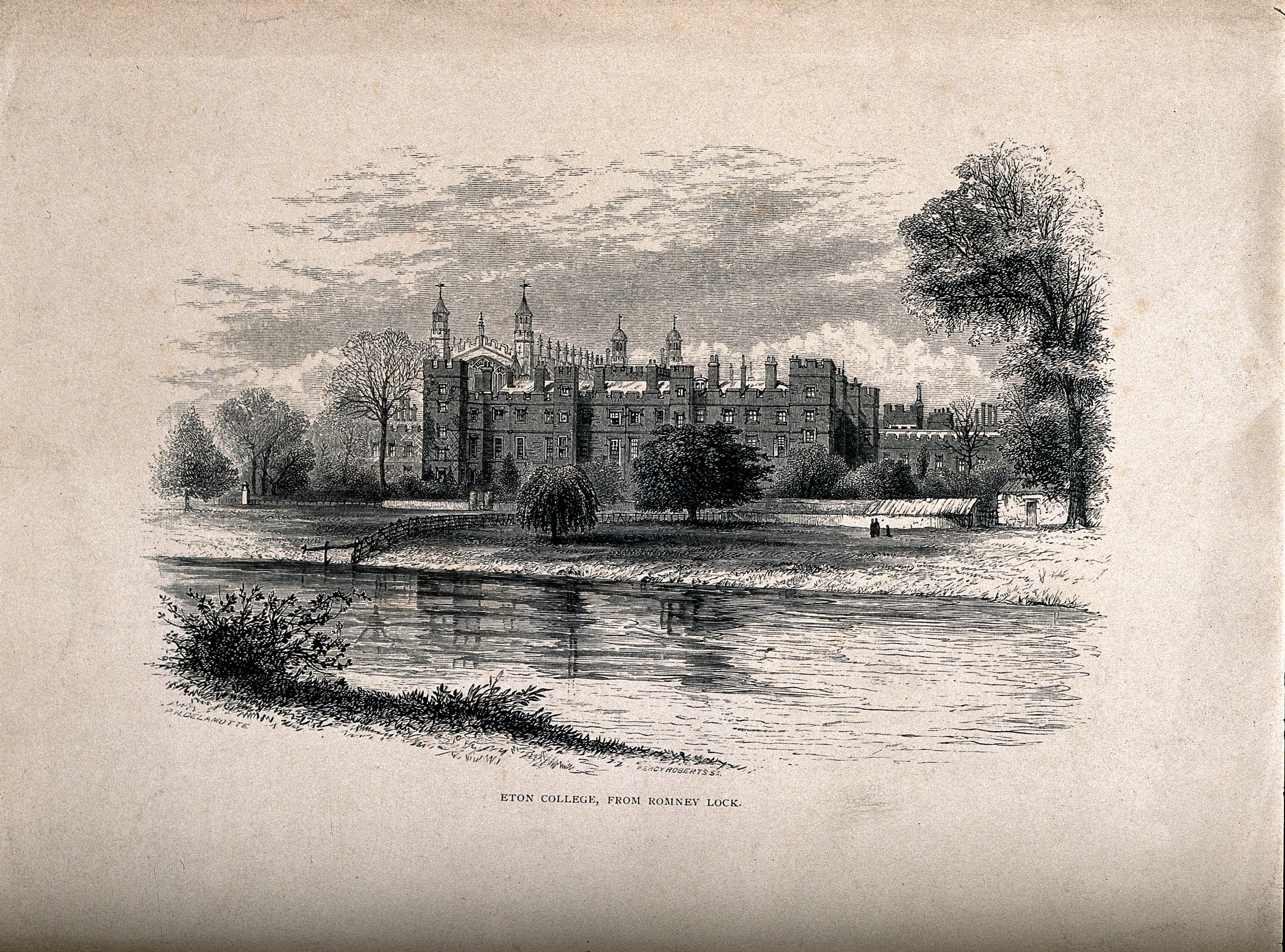
The Old Etonians had all attended Eton College.

Going into the 1882–83 FA Cup, Old Etonians, the team consisting of former pupils of the prestigious Eton College, were the reigning Cup holders. The Etonians had reached the final five times in the preceding eight seasons, winning in 1879 and 1882. In the latter final, they defeated Blackburn Rovers, from the Lancashire town of Blackburn, the first club not from London or the home counties to reach the final. Rovers' local rivals Blackburn Olympic entered the competition for the first time in the 1880–81 season but lost in the first round, a performance they repeated in the following season.

== Route to the final ==
=== Early rounds ===
Both Blackburn Olympic and Old Etonians entered the 1882–83 FA Cup at the first round stage; the competition operated on a knockout basis and there were six rounds before the final. Blackburn played against other clubs from Lancashire in each of the first four rounds. In the first round, they beat Accrington 6–3, and they defeated Lower Darwen 8–1 in the second. In the third round, they played Darwen Ramblers and scored only one goal in the first half, but dominated their opponents after half-time, scoring seven more goals without reply to win 8–0. A 2–0 victory over Church secured them a place in the quarter-finals. At this stage they faced opponents from outside Lancashire for the first time during the competition as they were paired with Druids, based in the village of Ruabon in Wales. A 4–1 victory took Blackburn into the semi-finals.

Quarter-finals
Blackburn Olympic	4
Druids	1
Old Carthusians	5
Clapham Rovers	3
Hendon	2
Old Etonians	4
Notts County	4
Aston Villa	3

Semi-finals
Blackburn Olympic	4
Old Carthusians	0
Old Etonians	2
Notts County	1

Final
Blackburn Olympic
Old Etonians

Old Etonians drew 1–1 with another Old Boys team, Old Foresters, in the first round, before beating them 3–1 in a replay two weeks later. In the second round they beat Brentwood 2–1. The Manchester Guardian reported that, although the Etonians had been victorious in the first two rounds, their performances suggested that they were unlikely to repeat their success of the previous season. Like Blackburn Olympic, the Etonians secured a high-scoring victory in the third round, defeating Rochester 7–0. They defeated Swifts 2–0 in the fourth round to reach the quarter-finals. At that stage they played Hendon and won 4–2 to secure a place in the semi-finals.

=== Semi-finals ===
The semi-finals of the competition featured two southern Old Boys teams and two clubs from the Midlands and north of England, and the random draw kept each pair apart. Blackburn played Old Carthusians, the team for former pupils of Charterhouse School, who had won the Cup in 1881 and were seen as favourites to win and reach the final again, even by the local newspapers in Blackburn. The game was played on 17 March at a neutral venue at Whalley Range in Manchester, and was late beginning because a football had not been provided and one had to be located. Playing with the wind and sun behind them, Olympic took a 2–0 lead in the first half; despite the conditions being against them after the change of ends at half-time, Blackburn scored two more goals in the second half to win 4–0 and reach the final. On the same day, Old Etonians played Notts County at Kennington Oval in London in front of what The Standard described as "an unusually large number of spectators". Notts County took the lead in the first half but the Etonians scored an equaliser shortly after half-time. Very late in the game, Harry Goodhart scored a second goal for the Etonians and the game finished 2–1 in their favour.

== Match ==
=== Summary ===
An engraving depicting the match, which appeared in the Illustrated Sporting and Dramatic News a week after the final.

The final took place on 31 March at Kennington Oval, which had hosted all but one of the previous 11 finals. The reported attendance was 8,000, the highest for any final at the time. Charles Crump, the president of the Birmingham & District Football Association, was the referee and the umpires were William Peirce Dix of the Sheffield FA and Morton Betts of the Old Harrovians club; Betts had scored the winning goal for Wanderers in the 1872 final. The Etonians' team included ten of the players who had taken part in the previous year's final, the only absentee being Philip Novelli, who was replaced by Herbert Bainbridge. The Honourable Arthur Kinnaird^{[a]} was the team's captain; it was the ninth FA Cup final in which he played, a record which still stands as of 2025. In addition to Kinnaird, the heir to a Scottish barony, the Etonian team included John Chevallier, a schoolmaster at the exclusive Repton School, and Goodhart, a fellow of Trinity College, Cambridge, who had served as tutor to the Duke of Clarence. In contrast, the Blackburn team included several weavers, a cotton mill worker, and an iron foundry worker; their captain, Albert Warburton, was a plumber. On the initiative of Jack Hunter, who played for the team as well as holding responsibilities somewhat akin to those of a modern coach, the Olympic players travelled to the coastal town of Blackpool before the final for a period of intensive training, something which was considered novel at the time. Hunter also placed importance on fitness and diet, an important consideration at a time when working-class people generally ate a poor diet and were on average smaller than those from higher social strata.

In the early years of football, teams had focused on attack by playing with at least six forwards. While the Etonians lined up with a 2–2–6 formation, with two full-backs, two half-backs, and six forwards, Olympic opted to use a 2–3–5 formation, with an additional half-back in place of a forward. Looking back on the match a decade later, the Cricket and Football Field newspaper said that this "certainly strengthened the defence without essentially weakening the attack". The 2–3–5 formation soon became the norm in English football and remained so for more than 40 years.

The Etonians, who were considered strong favourites to win the game, won the pre-match coin toss and chose to defend the Harleyford Road end of the ground in the first half. Blackburn kicked-off, and quickly attacked their opponents' goal, but Thomas French and Reginald Macaulay defended well for the Etonians. Shortly afterwards, the Etonians made their own attack; following a throw-in by William Anderson, the ball came close to Blackburn's goal but was cleared away by Warburton and the full-back Jimmy Ward. The action continued to go from end to end of the pitch. Skilful play by Jack Yates and James Costley led to a goalscoring opportunity for Blackburn, but the shot was too high and went over the goal; after this, Goodhart was involved in a number of attacking plays but the Olympic full-backs were able to repel them. Arthur Dunn of the Etonians came close to scoring but his shot was badly hit. Following this, the Cup holders continued to press their opponents, and took the lead after around half an hour of play; Macaulay and Chevallier were involved in the build-up before the ball reached Goodhart, who "shot it under the tape amid a scene of wild applause" according to the newspaper The Sportsman.^{[b]} Shortly before the half-time interval, Blackburn had a scoring opportunity but "[Charles] Foley's brilliant play saved his side", according to The Manchester Guardian. At the end of the first half, Old Etonians led 1–0.

The Etonians started the second half strongly and, according to The Manchester Guardian, the Olympic players "began to play a much rougher game, and the cry of foul was frequently raised against them"; according to The Field, "When, however, [Blackburn] began to play foul – they several times incurred the penalty for charging from behind, which, done upon two occasions, at least, most deliberately, and attempts at tripping were, if not always successful, pretty frequent – the Etonians were greatly discomfited." Goodhart had another shot, which went over the goal, and the Olympic goalkeeper, Thomas Hacking, had to "use all his skill and vigilance" to make another save, according to the Manchester Evening News. After this, the superior fitness of the Olympic players became more evident. Despite this, the Etonians nearly doubled their lead when Kinnaird took a free kick; the ball went into Blackburn's goal, but it had not been touched by any other player and therefore no goal was awarded; at the time, the rules did not permit a goal to be scored directly from a free kick. Roughly fifteen minutes into the second half, Dunn was "cannoned against and thrown", according to The Times; he injured his knee and had to leave the game, leaving his team with only ten players.^{[c]} The reporter for The Field wrote that Dunn "had shown as much or more ability than any forward on the field" and that his loss "seemed literally to confuse [Old Etonians]". After around 20 minutes of the second half, Blackburn scored an equaliser. Alfred Matthews took a shot from a wide position which eluded the Etonians' goalkeeper, John Rawlinson, and entered the goal, making the score 1–1. Following the goal, Blackburn continued to hold the upper hand, but Rawlinson was able to prevent them scoring. At the other end of the pitch, Hacking ran out from his goal to stop an attack launched by Macaulay and Anderson. At the end of the regulation 90 minutes, the score was 1–1.

The rules allowed for two 15-minute periods of extra time to be played to determine a winner if both teams agreed to it, and as the teams were in agreement the match continued. In the first fifteen minutes, little of note occurred, but shortly after the start of the second extra period, Blackburn's Thomas Dewhurst made a run with the ball before passing to Costley, who scored to give Olympic the lead. The Etonians made a comeback towards the end of extra time but no further goals were scored and the final score was 2–1 to Blackburn. By the end of the extra half-hour, three of the Olympic players were "crippled" but remained in the game, according to the report in the Nottingham Evening Post. Nonetheless, Blackburn were seen as having dominated the extra half hour due to their conditioning, which was far superior to that of their opponents; the reporter for the Nottinghamshire Guardian contended that in extra time the Etonians, with the exception of Rawlinson, "offered but a feeble resistance". Blackburn were praised for their use during the game as a whole of passing tactics and reliance on teamwork rather than individualistic skill; the play of the gentleman amateur teams had up to this point generally centred on players making long dribbling runs until they were tackled by an opponent, with little thought given to passing the ball between teammates. The Manchester Courier wrote that "individually the Etonians towered far away above their wiry little rivals, but collectively they were decidedly inferior".

=== Details ===
31 March 1883

Blackburn Olympic	2–1 (a.e.t.)	Old Etonians
65' Matthews; 108' Costley		30' Goodhart

Kennington Oval, London
Attendance: 8,000
Referee: Charles Crump

Blackburn Olympic	Old Etonians

GK	Thomas Hacking
FB	Jimmy Ward
FB	Albert Warburton
HB	Thomas Gibson
HB	William Astley
HB	Jack Hunter
FW	Thomas Dewhurst
FW	Alfred Matthews
FW	George Wilson
FW	James Costley
FW	Jack Yates

GK	John Rawlinson
FB	Thomas French
FB	Percy de Paravicini
HB	Hon. Arthur Kinnaird
HB	Charles Foley
FW	Arthur Dunn
FW	Herbert Bainbridge
FW	John Chevallier
FW	William Anderson
FW	Harry Goodhart
FW	Reginald Macaulay

== Post-match ==
Arthur Dunn of the 1883 Etonian team was honoured by the creation in 1902 of a competition specifically for Old Boys teams.

Major Francis Marindin, the president of the FA, presented the trophy and medals to the winning team at the conclusion of the match and Sir William Coddington, the Member of Parliament for Blackburn, gave a speech. As he received his medal, Hunter reportedly shouted "fifteen years at football, and got the English Cup at the finish!" It was the first time the presentation had taken place at the stadium on the day of the match; the trophy had previously been presented later in the year at the winning club's annual dinner. After the match, the two teams dined together. The Olympic team returned to Blackburn on the Monday following the match, where they were greeted by thousands of supporters as well as fireworks and three brass bands. They attended a civic reception, at which Warburton reportedly proclaimed "The Cup is very welcome to Lancashire. It'll have a good home and it'll never go back to London". The competition would not be won by another London-based team until 1901, by which time a different trophy was in use, the original having been stolen in 1895 and never recovered. The Blackburn Times newspaper characterised the victory as the "vanquishing, in a most severe trial of athletic skill, of a club composed of sons of some of the families of the upper class of the kingdom [...] by a provincial club composed entirely, as we believe, of Lancashire lads of the manual working-class, sons of small tradesmen, artisans, and operatives".

Blackburn Olympic's victory intensified the growing debate about professionalism in football. Officials of southern clubs called for more stringent investigations of the finances of northern clubs; they focused in particular on Olympic's training excursion to Blackpool, contending that the players could not have afforded to take so much time off work unless the club was paying them significantly more money than was permitted. Although ultimately no action was taken against Olympic, the tension continued. After being held to a draw by Preston North End in the following season's FA Cup, Upton Park lodged a protest with the FA that Preston had paid professionals in their team, and Preston were expelled from the competition. Following this incident, a number of northern clubs began to formulate plans to break away from the FA and form a new governing body if professionalism was not permitted. Ultimately, a schism in the sport was avoided when the FA voted to permit professionalism in 1885. In the following decade, a similar dispute about professional players arose in rugby football, but, unlike in the association game, it could not be resolved, ultimately leading to the division of the sport into the two separate codes of rugby union and rugby league.

The 1883 FA Cup final was the last to feature any of the home counties–based amateur clubs that had provided all of the finalists in the first decade of the competition's history. Blackburn Rovers won five of the next eight finals and other teams from the Midlands and north such as Aston Villa and Preston North End had also claimed the trophy by 1893. In that year, with professional clubs now dominating the FA Cup, the FA introduced the FA Amateur Cup alongside it; the Old Boys teams ultimately withdrew from both competitions in favour of competing among themselves for the Arthur Dunn Challenge Cup, introduced in 1902 and named in memory of one of the 1883 Etonian team. Blackburn Olympic reached the semi-finals of the FA Cup in the 1883–84 season, as did Blackburn Rovers, setting up the possibility of an all-Blackburn final. Olympic, however, were defeated at the semi-final stage; Rovers won their semi-final and went on to win the final. Olympic never again progressed beyond the second round while Rovers cemented their status as one of the country's top teams by winning the FA Cup in both 1885 and 1886. When The Football League, the sport's first league competition, was formed in 1888, Rovers were chosen to be among the founder members and Olympic were not. Increasingly unable to compete financially with their near-neighbours, Olympic folded in 1889. The story of the clash between the wealthy Etonians and the working-class players from Blackburn inspired the 2020 Netflix mini-series The English Game, although a degree of artistic license was applied; Fergus Suter, depicted as Blackburn's star player, was a real footballer but he did not play in the 1883 final or indeed play for Olympic at all.

== Footnotes ==
a. As the eldest son of a baron, Kinnaird was styled "The Honourable" until 1887, when his father died and he inherited the barony.
b. The rigid crossbar had been introduced but was not yet mandatory in March 1883; a length of tape was often used instead to mark the top of the goal. Some newspaper reports on the final refer to the "bar" of the goal, but at least one mentions a tape, so it is unclear which was actually used.
c. The concept of substitutes was not introduced to English football until the 1960s; previously, an injured player had to play on or else the team had to continue with a reduced number of players.
