= George Wilson (footballer, born 1859) =

English footballer

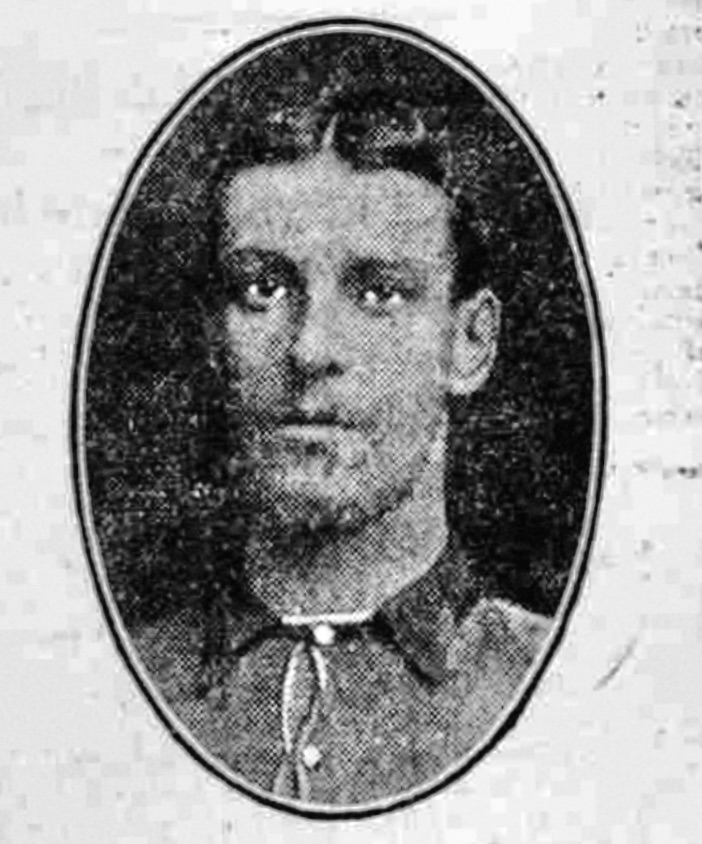
- George Wilson, Blackburn Olympic, circa 1883, from the Sheffield Evening Telegraph, 2 February 1907

Personal information
- Full name: George William Wilson
- Date of birth: 19 May 1859
- Place of birth: Swinton, South Yorkshire, England
- Date of death: 1924
- Position: Centre-forward

Senior career*
Years	Team	Apps	(Gls)
- Mexborough
1881–82	The Wednesday		
1882–83	Blackburn Olympic		
1883–84	Preston North End		
1884–91	Mexborough		
- * Club domestic league appearances and goals

George William Wilson (5 May 1859 – 17 October 1930) was an English association footballer who won the FA Cup with Blackburn Olympic in 1883.

== Early life ==
Wilson was born on 5 May 1859 in Swinton into a family with its roots in glass bottle manufacture.

== Football career ==
Wilson played as centre-forward for Mexborough in the late 1870s; he was famous enough to play for The Zulus touring side, and in 1881 he played briefly for Sheffield Wednesday. He moved to Olympic the following year as one of the two professional "imports", as the Wednesday objected to his taking payment for playing for the Zulus. He was known for long throws and was employed as a clerk in Blackburn in order to justify his amateur status. His debut for the Olympic was at Nottingham Forest in October 1882, the game ending acrimoniously as the Olympians walked off in protest at the referee allowing a goal after an offside Norman charged goalkeeper Thomas Hacking out of the way of a goalbound shot.

Wilson also made his competitive debut in the first round of the Lancashire Senior Cup the same month, in an easy 11–0 win over the obscure Padiham Church club, but, as he had not lived in Blackburn for the required 2 years, the Olympians were disqualified - it was assumed this was a deliberate move so the Olympians could concentrate on bigger competition. Wilson duly scored in each of the first five rounds of Olympic's 1882–83 FA Cup run. In the final against the Old Etonians; he did put the ball in the goal close to the end of the match, but it was disallowed on the basis that it had already gone out of play, It was his pass to Alf Matthews that led to Matthews scoring the Olympians' equalizer. He also played in the Olympic side which lost the 1883 Lancashire Charity Cup final 6–2 to Blackburn Rovers.

The generally working-class Olympic did not have the wealthy backing that other clubs in the region had, and Preston North End "lured George Wilson from Blackburn Olympic by offering him the tenancy of the Black-a-Moor-Head public house" for the 1883–84 season. His time with North End was not a success due to injury, and he returned to Mexborough in 1884. He won the Sheffield Senior Cup with the club in 1886; one of his final appearances for the club was in goal in the Minor Cup for amateur Sheffield sides.

== Post-football career ==
Wilson returned to Swinton (South Yorkshire) when his career was over. He married Hannah Hawkins in Swinton on 24 October 1883, and the couple had two sons who survived into adulthood - Harry Wilson and John Wilfred Wilson.

Some time after Hannah's passing in 1895, Wilson married Clara Sykes. Together they had one daughter who survived into adulthood - Annie Wilson

Wilson died in 1930 and is buried in Haugh Road cemetery, Rawmarsh, Rotherham (unmarked grave - Plot C220) along with his daughter Doris Wilson (1912-1914).
