= List of Blackburn Rovers F.C. managers =

Tony Mowbray is the current head coach of Blackburn Rovers, an English professional football club based in the town of Blackburn, Lancashire. He is currently taking a leave of absence, for health reasons.

Founded on 5 November 1875, the club was one of the first to become professional. The club first played in the FA Cup in 1879 and managed to reach the final of the competition in 1882. Blackburn was one of the twelve founding member of the Football League in 1888.

The club have been champions of England three times, in 1911–12, 1913–14 and 1994–95. They have won the FA Cup six times, in 1884, 1885, 1886, 1890, 1891 and 1927–28. The club has also won one Football League Cup in 2001–02, one FA Charity Shield in 1912, and one Full Members' Cup, in 1986–87.

The club was initially managed by a committee of players whose secretary had the same powers and role as a manager has today. In 1884, James Fiellding became secretary-manager. Under Fielding, Blackburn won the FA Cup three times in a row; 1884, 1885 and 1886. Thomas Mitchell would guide Blackburn to a further two FA Cup wins in 1890 and 1891 before he left the club in 1896. His five FA Cups make him the most successful manager in Blackburn's history.

The longest-serving person to manage Blackburn is Robert Middleton, who was in charge of the club for 22 years and 3 months: from 1 August 1903 to 1 February 1922; a total of 605 competitive matches. During his tenure Middleton won two First Division titles (1912, 1914) and one FA Charity Shield in 1912. The shortest serving manager is Henning Berg who was manager from 31 October 2012 to 27 December 2012, a total of 57 days and 10 competitive matches.

There have been a total of 39 permanent managers at Blackburn and 5 caretakers. Two managers have held the position twice, Bob Crompton (December 1926 – February 1931 and June 1938 – March 1941) and Johnny Carey (June 1953 – October 1958 and October 1970 – June 1971), while Tony Parkes has been caretaker 4 separate times.

Every manager has come from the UK except for Johnny Carey and Owen Coyle who were Irish, Henning Berg who is Norwegian, Jon Dahl Tomasson who is Danish, and Valérien Ismaël who is French.

The previous head coach was Michael O'Neill, who was appointed on a short-term contract.

Tony Mowbray was appointed head coach for his second stint on 5 June 2026.

== List of managers ==
Information correct after match played on 22 November 2026. Only competitive matches are counted, except the abandoned 1939–40 Football League season and matches in Wartime Leagues and Cups.

Names of caretaker managers are supplied where known, and the names of caretaker managers are highlighted in italics and marked with an asterisk (*).

List of Blackburn Rovers F.C. managers
Name	Nationality	From	To	Matches	Won	Drawn (Note: Drawn matches decided by penalty shoot-outs are counted as draws.)	Lost	Win% (Note: Win% is rounded to two decimal places.)	Honours (Note: League titles, promotions, FA Cups, EFL Cups, and Community Shields.)	Refs.
James Fielding	England	1884	1887						FA Cup winners: 1884, 1885, 1886	
Thomas Mitchell	Scotland	1 August 1887	31 May 1896	263	127	53	83	48.29	FA Cup winners: 1890, 1891	
Joseph Walmsley	England	1 August 1896	31 May 1903	248	89	48	111	35.89		
Robert Middleton	England	1 August 1903	1 February 1922	605	238	155	212	39.34	First Division champions: 1911-12, 1913-14; FA Charity Shield winners: 1912	
Jack Carr	England	1 February 1922	1 December 1926	217	76	60	81	35.02		
Bob Crompton	England	1 December 1926	1 February 1931	198	84	41	73	42.42	FA Cup winners: 1927-28	
Arthur Barritt	England	1 February 1931	30 April 1936	238	86	47	105	36.13		
Reg Taylor	England	1 October 1936	1 April 1938	72	23	18	31	31.94		
Bob Crompton	England	1 June 1938	31 March 1941	57	32	9	16	56.14	Second Division champions: 1938-39	
Eddie Hapgood	England	1 June 1944	28 February 1947	34	10	8	16	29.41		
Will Scott	England	1 April 1947	1 December 1947	28	8	4	16	28.57		
Jack Bruton	England	1 December 1947	31 May 1949	70	22	16	32	31.43		
Jackie Bestall	England	1 June 1949	31 May 1953	179	72	35	72	40.22		
Johnny Carey	Ireland	1 June 1953	1 October 1958	235	119	49	67	50.64	Second Division runners-up/promoted: 1957-58	
Dally Duncan	Scotland	1 October 1958	1 June 1960	85	36	15	34	42.35		
Jack Marshall	England	1 June 1960	1 February 1967	329	122	79	128	37.08		
Eddie Quigley	England	1 February 1967	21 October 1970	168	65	41	62	38.69		
Johnny Carey	Ireland	21 October 1970	8 June 1971	31	5	9	17	16.13		
Ken Furphy	England	4 August 1971	5 December 1973	119	50	30	39	42.02		
Richard Dinnis*	England	5 December 1973	14 January 1974	9	4	1	4	44.44		
Gordon Lee	England	14 January 1974	12 June 1975	82	34	27	21	41.46	Third Division champions: 1974–75	
Jim Smith	England	20 June 1975	12 March 1978	128	46	35	47	35.94		
Norman Bodell*	England	13 March 1978	14 April 1978	8	2	2	4	25.00		
Jim Iley	England	14 April 1978	1 November 1978	16	2	6	8	12.50		
John Pickering	England	1 November 1978	15 May 1979	61	15	15	31	24.59		
Howard Kendall	England	1 June 1979	1 June 1981	105	48	33	24	45.71	Third Division runners-up/promoted: 1979–80	
Bobby Saxton	England	31 May 1981	30 December 1986	257	93	73	91	36.19		
Tony Parkes*	England	30 December 1986	3 February 1987	6	3	2	1	50.00		
Don Mackay	Scotland	3 February 1987	2 September 1991	232	91	64	77	39.22	Full Members' Cup winners: 1986-87	
Tony Parkes*	England	2 September 1991	12 October 1991	9	5	2	2	55.56		
Kenny Dalglish	Scotland	12 October 1991	25 June 1995	196	103	46	47	52.55	Second Division promoted: 1991-92; Premier League champions: 1994-95	
Ray Harford	England	25 June 1995	25 October 1996	64	24	13	27	37.50		
Tony Parkes*	England	25 October 1996	1 June 1997	30	10	11	9	33.33		
Roy Hodgson	England	1 June 1997	21 November 1998	63	22	18	23	34.92		
Tony Parkes*	England	21 November 1998	4 December 1998	2	0	0	2	0.00		
Brian Kidd	England	4 December 1998	3 November 1999	44	12	18	14	27.27		
Tony Parkes*	England	2 October 1999	14 March 2000	26	11	8	7	42.31		
Graeme Souness	Scotland	14 March 2000	6 September 2004	212	86	61	65	40.57	First Division runners-up/promoted: 2000-01; Football League Cup winners: 2001-02	
Tony Parkes*	England	6 September 2004	15 September 2004	1	0	0	1	0.00		
Mark Hughes	Wales	15 September 2004	4 June 2008	188	82	47	59	43.62		
Paul Ince	England	22 June 2008	16 December 2008	21	6	4	11	28.57		
Sam Allardyce	England	17 December 2008	13 December 2010	90	32	24	34	35.56		
Steve Kean	Scotland	13 December 2010	28 September 2012	74	21	16	37	28.38		
Eric Black*	Scotland	28 September 2012	31 October 2012	6	2	3	1	33.33		
Henning Berg	Norway	31 October 2012	27 December 2012	10	1	3	6	10.00		
Gary Bowyer*	England	27 December 2012	11 January 2013	4	3	1	0	75.00		
Michael Appleton	England	11 January 2013	19 March 2013	15	4	5	6	26.67		
Gary Bowyer*	England	19 March 2013	24 May 2013	9	3	3	3	33.33		
Gary Bowyer	England	24 May 2013	10 November 2015	118	41	43	34	34.75		
Paul Lambert	England	15 November 2015	7 May 2016	33	12	8	13	36.36		
Owen Coyle	Ireland	2 June 2016	21 February 2017	37	11	8	18	29.73		
Tony Mowbray	England	22 February 2017	30 May 2022	267	108	70	89	40.45	League One runners-up/promoted: 2017–18	
Jon Dahl Tomasson	Denmark	14 June 2022	9 February 2024	90	40	14	36	44.44		
Damien Johnson*	Northern Ireland	10 February 2024	10 February 2024	1	1	0	0	100.00		
John Eustace	England	11 February 2024 (Note: Eustace's Blackburn appointment was announced on 9 February, but first-team coaches David Lowe and Damien Johnson took charge of the following day's match.)	10 February 2025	52	18	15	19	34.62		
David Lowe*	England	12 February 2025 (Note: David Lowe took charge while Eustace was 'in negotiations with another club' - later revealed as being Derby County.)	25 February 2025	3	2	0	1	66.67		
Valérien Ismaël	France	25 February 2025	2 February 2026	43	11	12	20	25.58		
Damien Johnson*	Northern Ireland	2 February 2026	13 February 2026	2	1	0	1	50.00		
Michael O'Neill	Northern Ireland	13 February 2026	12 May 2026	15	5	5	5	33.33		
Tony Mowbray	England	5 June 2026	Unknown	17	7	3	7	41.18		
Damien Johnson*	Northern Ireland	17 November 2026	Present	1	0	1	0	0.00		

== Records ==
=== Nationalities ===
As of 29 April 2026 (including caretakers)

- (England) English (33)
- (Scotland) Scottish (7)
- (Republic of Ireland) Irish (2)
- (Northern Ireland) Northern Irish (2)
- (Denmark) Danish (1)
- (France) French (1)
- (Norway) Norwegian (1)
- (Wales) Welsh (1)
