= List of Preston North End F.C. managers =

== Managerial history ==
As of 28 September 2026

The following is a list of Preston North End managers and caretaker managers.

Statistics include League, FA Cup, League Cup and Football League Trophy matches. All points averages are calculated using three points for a win.

Caretaker managers are shown in italics.

Manager	Nationality	From	To	Total					League					
Manager	Nationality	From	To	G	W	D	L	Win %	G	W	D	L	Win %	Point Av.
William Sudell	England	1881	1889											
E.H. Bahr	England	1889	1906											
Charlie Parker	England	1906	1915						357	134	86	137	37.54	1.37
Vincent Hayes	England	1919	1923						166	59	41	66	35.54	1.31
James Lawrence	Scotland	1923	1925						107	31	19	57	28.97	1.05
Frank Richards	England	1925	1927						89	39	18	32	43.82	1.52
Alex Gibson	Scotland	1927	1931						165	65	36	64	39.39	1.40
Lincoln Hyde	England	1931	1932						35	10	12	13	28.57	1.20
Tommy Muirhead	Scotland	1936	1937						56	22	15	19	39.29	1.45
Will Scott	England	1949	1953						163	78	36	49	47.85	1.66
Scot Symon	Scotland	1953	1954						63	30	11	22	47.62	1.60
Frank Hill	Scotland	1954	1956						88	31	17	40	35.23	1.25
Cliff Britton	England	1956	1961						230	102	54	74	44.35	1.56
Jimmy Milne	Scotland	1961	1968						350	126	96	128	36.00	1.35
Bobby Seith	Scotland	1968	1970						70	15	21	34	21.48	0.94
Alan Ball Sr.	England	1970	12 February 1973						118	44	36	38	37.29	1.42
Frank Lord	England	12 February 1973	4 May 1973	13	1	5	7	7.69	13	1	5	7	7.69	0.62
Bobby Charlton	England	1973	21 August 1975						89	29	25	35	32.58	1.26
Nobby Stiles	England	1975	1975						1	0	1	0	0.00	1.00
Harry Catterick	England	1975	1977						90	38	22	30	42.22	1.51
Nobby Stiles	England	1977	1981						174	56	67	51	32.18	1.35
Tommy Docherty	Scotland	1 June 1981	2 December 1981	22	5	7	10	22.72	17	3	6	8	17.65	0.88
Alan Kelly	Ireland	3 December 1981	8 December 1981	1	0	0	1	0.00	1	0	0	1	0.00	0.00
Gordon Lee	England	9 December 1981	20 December 1983	105	38	27	40	36.19	93	32	25	36	34.41	1.30
Alan Kelly	Ireland	21 December 1983	2 February 1985	59	19	12	28	32.20	52	17	10	25	32.69	1.17
Tommy Booth	England	9 February 1985	5 December 1985	54	15	10	29	27.78	49	13	9	27	26.53	0.98
Brian Kidd	England	5 December 1985	21 March 1986	19	2	5	12	10.52	17	1	5	11	5.88	0.47
Jonathan Clark	England	22 March 1986	3 May 1986	10	5	2	3	50.00	10	5	2	3	50.00	1.70
John McGrath	England	1 June 1986	13 February 1990	192	74	53	65	38.54	165	68	45	54	41.21	1.51
Les Chapman	England	17 February 1990	29 September 1992	129	44	30	55	34.11	118	39	29	50	33.05	1.24
Sam Allardyce	England	30 September 1992	30 November 1992	12	3	4	5	25.00	10	3	3	4	30.00	1.20
John Beck	England	1 December 1992	1 December 1994	99	36	20	43	36.36	87	31	19	37	35.63	1.29
Gary Peters	England	2 December 1994	11 January 1998	166	72	42	52	43.37	143	63	37	43	44.06	1.58
David Moyes	Scotland	12 January 1998	14 March 2002	234	113	60	61	48.29	196	95	53	48	48.47	1.72
Kelham O'Hanlon	Ireland	15 March 2002	28 April 2002	8	4	1	3	50.00	8	4	1	3	50.00	1.63
Craig Brown	Scotland	29 April 2002	28 August 2004	106	36	30	40	33.96	97	32	28	37	32.99	1.28
Billy Davies	Scotland	29 August 2004	2 June 2006	101	45	35	21	45.55	87	40	31	16	45.98	1.74
Paul Simpson	England	17 June 2006	13 November 2007	67	27	14	26	40.30	62	25	14	23	40.32	1.44
Alan Irvine	Scotland	20 November 2007	29 December 2009	110	45	25	40	40.90	99	40	24	35	40.40	1.45
Rob Kelly	England	30 December 2009	5 January 2010	1	1	0	0	100.00	0	0	0	0		
Darren Ferguson	Scotland	6 January 2010	29 December 2010	49	13	11	25	26.53	45	11	11	23	24.44	0.98
David Unsworth	England	30 December 2010	5 January 2011	2	0	0	2	0.00	2	0	0	2	0.00	0.00
Phil Brown	England	6 January 2011	14 December 2011	51	15	15	21	29.41	42	13	11	18	30.95	1.19
David Unsworth & Graham Alexander	England; Scotland	15 December 2011	12 January 2012	5	2	2	1	40.00	5	2	2	1	40.00	1.60
Graham Westley	England	13 January 2012	13 February 2013	62	16	23	23	25.81	52	11	21	20	21.15	1.04
John Dreyer	England	14 February 2013	17 February 2013	1	1	0	0	100.00	1	1	0	0	100.00	3.00
Simon Grayson	England	18 February 2013	29 June 2017	235	104	74	57	44.26	198	84	67	47	42.42	1.61
Alex Neil	Scotland	4 July 2017	21 March 2021	191	72	48	71	37.70	129	51	37	41	39.53	1.47
Frankie McAvoy	Scotland	21 March 2021	6 December 2021	33	14	9	10	42.4						
Ryan Lowe	England	7 December 2021	12 August 2024	124	47	31	46	37.90						
Mike Marsh	England	12 August 2024	17 August 2024	2	1	00	1	50	1	0	0	1	0	00.00
Paul Heckingbottom	England	20 August 2024	13 September 2026	109	30	38	41	27.52						
Jason Euell	England	13 September 2026	28 September 2026	1	0	1	0	0.00	1	0	1	0	00.00	1.00
Graham Alexander	Scotland	28 September 2026	Present											
