= Herbert Bainbridge =

English cricketer and footballer

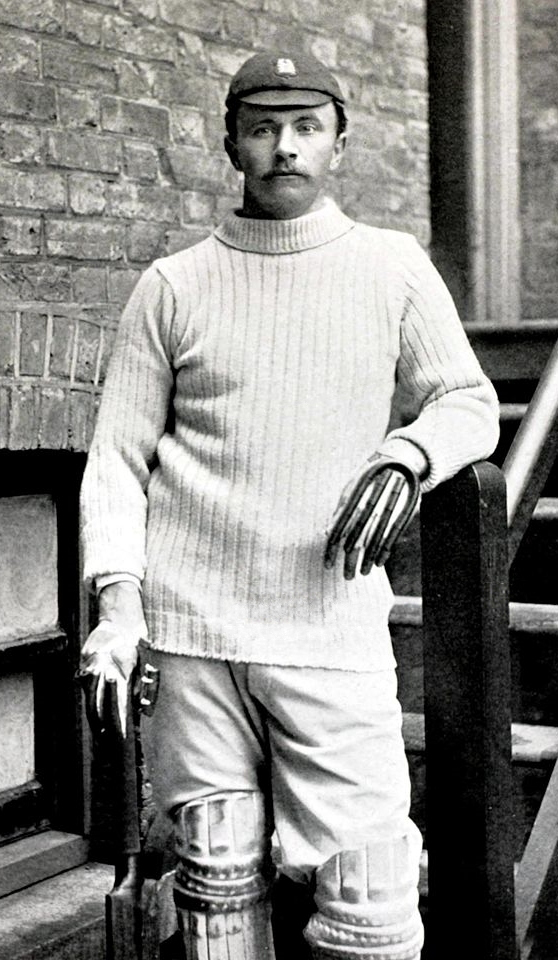
- Bainbridge pictured in the 1890s

Personal information
- Full name: Herbert William Bainbridge
- Born: 29 October 1862; Guwahati, Assam, British India
- Died: 3 March 1940 (aged 77); Leamington Spa, Warwickshire, England
- Batting: Right-handed
- Bowling: Slow

Domestic team information
- Years: Team
- 1883–1887: MCC
- 1883–1885: Surrey
- 1884–1886: Cambridge University
- 1894–1902: Warwickshire

Career statistics
Competition	First-class
Matches	177
Runs scored	6,878
Batting average	25.76
100s/50s	7/34
Top score	162
Balls bowled	1,757
Wickets	31
Bowling average	31.87
5 wickets in innings	0
10 wickets in match	0
Best bowling	3/21
Catches/stumpings	101/–
- Source: CricketArchive, 23 August 2012

Herbert William Bainbridge (29 October 1862 – 3 March 1940) was an English first-class cricketer and footballer. Bainbridge played cricket principally for Eton, Marylebone Cricket Club (MCC), Surrey, Cambridge University and Warwickshire. He was born at Guwahati, Assam, India and died at Leamington Spa, Warwickshire, England.

== Cricket career ==
Bainbridge played four seasons at Eton College, being made captain in 1882. While studying at Trinity College, Cambridge, he played for Cambridge University and was awarded his Blue in 1884 and appointed captain in 1885. The right-handed batsman, occasionally made appearances for Surrey from 1883 to 1885, then playing for Warwickshire between 1888 and 1902 and was appointed captain in his first season. After 1902 Bainbridge became honorary secretary, an office he retained when appointed chairman. His highest score of 162 was made against Hampshire at Southampton in 1897, with a career average of 25.76, his slow-bowling claimed 31 wickets at an average of 31.87.

=== England selector ===
Bainbridge was one of the first three England selectors on The Ashes tour of 1899 along with Lord Hawke and W. G. Grace.

== Football career ==
Bainbridge played football for Cambridge University without gaining his Blue. In 1883, he played football for the losing finalists Old Etonians against Blackburn Olympic in the 1883 FA Cup Final. He later played for Warwick County F.C.

== Business interests ==
Herbert's grandfather Anthony Fothergill Bainbridge had set up the Young's and Bainbridge Brewery with Charles Young in Wandsworth in 1831, and later his father Herbert Glendilling Bainbridge split from Youngs and became a partner of the Henry Mitchell & Co. brewery in Cape Hill, Smethwick, which later became Mitchells & Butlers Brewery. Herbert William Bainbridge succeeded his father's business interests and became a Director of Mitchells & Butlers Brewery for many years.
