= Thomas Dewhurst =

English footballer

Personal information
- Full name: Thomas Dewhurst
- Date of birth: 20 December 1862
- Place of birth: Samlesbury, Lancashire
- Date of death: 20 January 1940 (aged 77)
- Place of death: Penwortham, Lancashire
- Position: Half-back

Senior career*
Years	Team	Apps	(Gls)
1879–86, 1887–88	Blackburn Olympic		
1884	Burnley		
1886–87	Halliwell		
1888	Nelson		
1891–92	Higher Walton		
- * Club domestic league appearances and goals

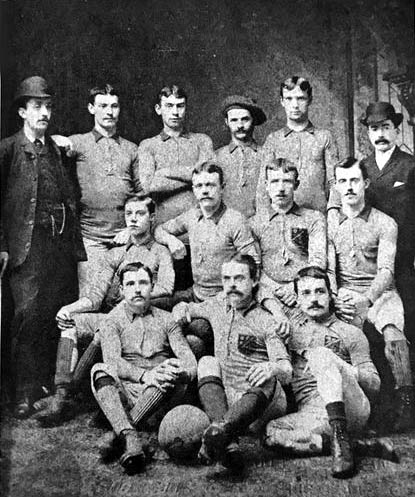
The Blackburn Olympic Cup-winning side in 1883. Dewhurst is standing third from the left in the top row

Thomas "Tom" Dewhurst (20 December 1862 - 20 January 1940) was an association footballer who won the FA Cup as a player for Blackburn Olympic in 1883.

== Early life ==
Like most of the Olympic side, generally considered "not high enough on the social scale", Dewhurst was of solid working-class stock; his father (also Thomas) was a spinning master at a Blackburn cotton mill, and Dewhurst also became a weaver.

== Football career ==
=== Blackburn Olympic ===
Dewhurst had been scouted by the Olympic after showing form for the Black Prince junior side, and, after a period with the reserves, was promoted to the first team in an emergency for a match against Church in 1882; once in the side, he became a near-permanent fixture on the right-wing.

His competitive debut for the club came in the first round of the 1882–83 FA Cup, making one of the goals in Olympic's 6–3 win over Accrington. He made two goals, and scored one himself, in the 8–1 win over Lower Darwen in the second round, and scored the opening goal in the semi-final against Old Carthusians inside the first five minutes. His, and Olympic's, season reached a climax in beating the Old Etonians in the final, the winning goal coming in the second half of extra time after Dewhurst crossed for James Costley to finish.

It was the club's final trophy. Dewhurst was part of the Olympic side which lost the Lancashire Senior Cup final in 1884.

At the start of the 1884–85 season, Dewhurst was found in Burnley colours, despite an expectation that he would join Bolton Wanderers. His stint with Burnley however only lasted one match; he promptly returned to Olympic for the season, and scored a hat-trick in the 12–0 win at Oswaldtwistle Rovers, but his season ended after he broke his arm in a match against Darwen. His final full season with Olympic in 1885–86 was a disappointment, the opinion being that he had become "downright lazy", although he scored in two of the three matches Olympic played against Church in the 1885–86 FA Cup, which ended in the Olympians' defeat.

=== Dropped by England ===
Dewhurst was selected to play for the England national football team for the match against Ireland in 1884, but was dropped from the squad after an incident in the 1883–84 FA Cup fifth round tie against Northwich Victoria; the Olympic, dominating the opponents, "played pranks with them to the amusement of the spectators", and, after a report that Dewhurst had thrown mud at one of the Victoria players, the Football Association notified Dewhurst his services were no longer required.

=== Post-Olympic ===
In 1886, Dewhurst moved to Halliwell, which had also recruited players from Great Lever in an attempt to step up in the national game. Unfortunately for the Halliwellians, its move came too late, as its new players were not registered in time to play in the 1886–87 FA Cup, so it scratched from its first round tie with Blackburn Rovers. A sign of the potential was that Halliwell instead played out a friendly, which ended 3–3, Dewhurst scoring twice. However the Halliwell project fell apart; Dewhurst was out of form in the Halliwellians' Lancashire Cup defeat to Higher Walton and fell ill during a match with Preston North End in sodden conditions in October. By December 1887, Dewhurst had "been discharged" by Halliwell, and returned to Olympic, where he showed "flashes of his old form".

In 1888, Dewhurst joined Nelson, along with former team-mate Costley, but the arrangement did not seem to last long, and Dewhurst finished his career in 1891–92 playing for Higher Walton.

== Personal life ==
Dewhurst married Mary Neville on 21 October 1884, at St John the Evangelist Church in Blackburn. The couple had one daughter. In later life, following an injury, he became a publican. He was the last surviving member of the Olympic Cup-winning side, dying after a short illness in Penwortham in 1940.
