= Alfred Matthews (footballer) =

English footballer

Alfred Matthews was an English footballer who won the FA Cup with Blackburn Olympic in 1883.

== Pre-football career ==
In common with most of the Olympic side, Matthews was from the local working-class; at the time he played for the club, he was a picture framer.

== Football career ==
The first recorded appearance for Matthews in Olympic colours was as one of the two right-wingers in a defeat at Eagley in December 1879.

Matthews properly broke into the team in the 1881–82 season, making his FA Cup debut in the club's first round defeat at Darwen that year. He finished the season by picking up his first medal for Olympic, as a right-winger in the side which beat Blackburn Rovers 5–2 in the East Lancashire Charity Cup final in August, the tie delayed after Accrington withdrew from the semi-final in a huff after Olympic successfully protested the Owd Reds' fielding of an ineligible player.

His second season as a first choice player, 1882–83, was the Olympians' greatest season. He scored his first goal in the Cup in the 8–1 win over Lower Darwen in the second round, and played a crucial part in one of the goals in the semi-final win over the Old Carthusians by barging goalkeeper Thompson out of the way of a Yates shot. His and the Olympians' career reached a peak in the 1883 FA Cup final against the Old Etonians; Matthews scored the equalizer in the 67th minute thanks to a "capital screw kick", and also hit the post, as the Olympians secured the trophy with a 2–1 extra-time win.

The season ended in a disappointment as a weakened Olympic side lost to Rovers in the 1883 Lancashire Charity Cup final. He also collected runners-up medals in the Lancashire Senior Cup in 1884 and 1885.

The Light Blues were left behind by the growing tendency towards professionalism, given its comparative lack of backing when compared to other Lancashire sides. Matthews himself did not turn professional when the Football Association legalized it in 1885; Olympic registered him as an amateur. Perhaps because of this, he was no longer a first choice for Olympic, and had made his last Cup appearance in the demolition of at Oswaldtwistle Rovers in the first round of the 1884–85 competition.

Nevertheless, he remained loyal to the side, his last recorded game coming in 1889. He does not seem to have joined any other clubs afterwards. He made one final appearance in Olympic colours, in a match for the benefit of former Olympic chairman John Dixon; he turned out for an old Olympian side against former Rovers players in March 1892, in front of nearly 4,000 at Ewood Park.

== Post-football ==
After his career ended, Matthews, considered "the Adonis of the team", became a Church Army captain in London. He died some time before 1939, as he was not one of the last three surviving Olympic Cup winners.
