= Jack Yates (footballer, born 1861) =

English footballer

John Yates
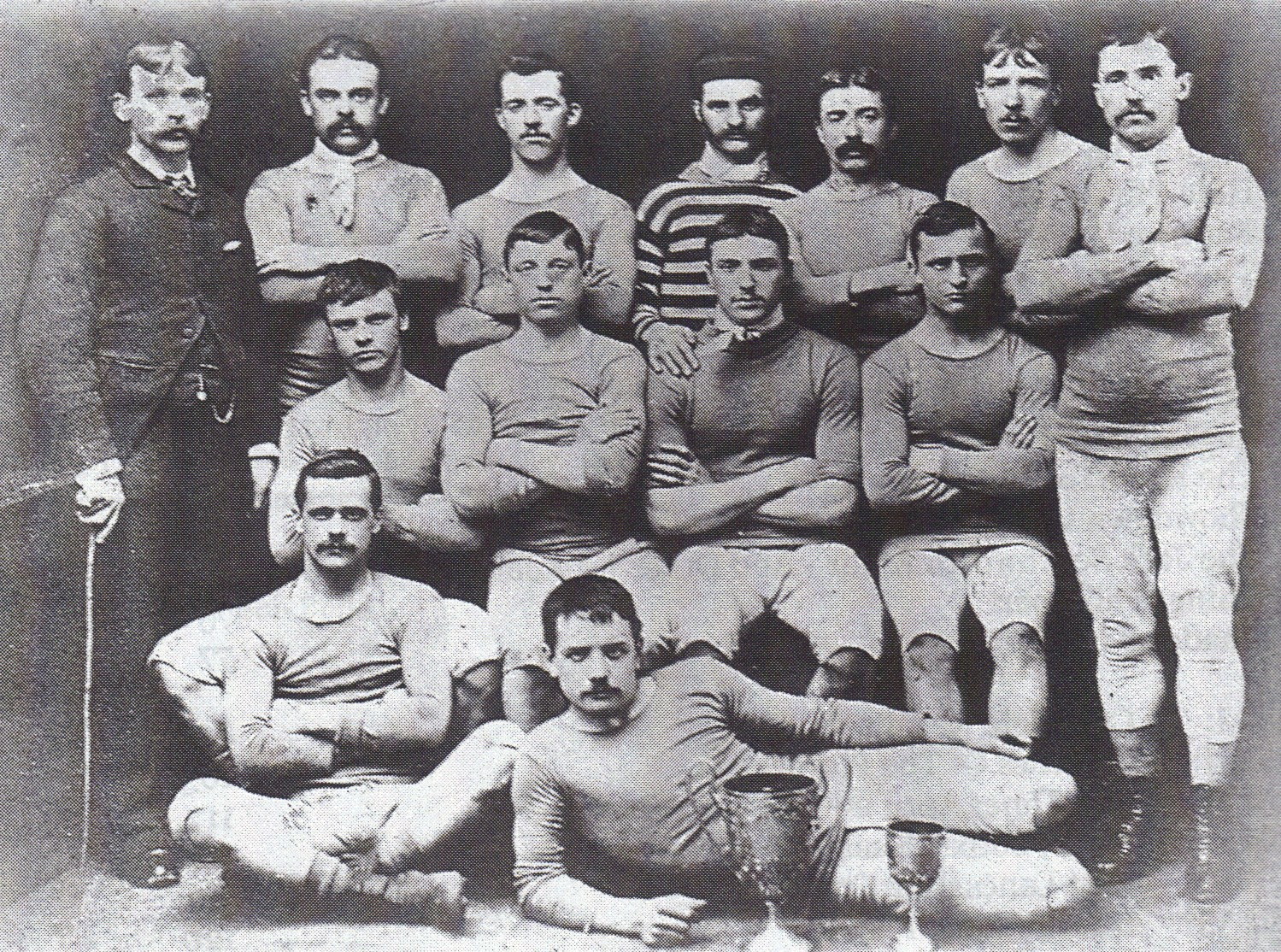

Personal information
- Date of birth: 3 January 1861
- Place of birth: Blackburn, England
- Date of death: 1 June 1917 (aged 56)
- Position: Forward

Senior career*
Years	Team	Apps	(Gls)
1880–85, 1885–86	Blackburn Olympic		
1885, 1886–88	Accrington		
1888–1893	Burnley	29	(7)

International career
1889	England	1	(3)
- * Club domestic league appearances and goals

John Yates (3 January 1861 – 1 June 1917) was an English footballer who won the FA Cup with Blackburn Olympic in 1883 and made one appearance for England in 1889 playing on the left wing.

== Early career ==
Yates was born in Blackburn but started his football career with Accrington in 1879. After a year, he joined Blackburn Olympic and was part of the team of tradesmen and weavers who achieved a small level of success in the 1880s, backed by local iron foundry owner Sid Yates and coached by former England player Jack Hunter. Their greatest success came when they overcame the dominance of local rivals, Blackburn Rovers, and the amateur teams of southern England to win the FA Cup in 1883.

Yates briefly played for Accrington again in 1885, returning to Olympic until finances at the Light Blues ran dry, and then returned to Accrington; he spent a further two years with the club before joining Burnley in 1888.

== 1888-1889 ==
Yates made his League debut on 8 September 1888, playing as a winger, at Deepdale, home of Preston North End. The home team defeated Burnley 5–2. Jack Yates scored his League debut on 27 October 1888, playing as a winger, at Trent Bridge, then home of Notts County. The home side defeated Burnley 6–1, Jack Yates scoring Burnley' solitary goal. Jack Yates appeared in 21 of the 22 League matches played by Burnley in season 1888–89 scoring five League goals. As a winger (21 appearances) he played in a midfield that achieved big (three–League–goals–or–more) on two separate occasions. Jack Yates' five League goals included two–in–a–match once.

== International career ==
Yates had previously represented Lancashire on many occasions, and received his solitary England cap for the match against Ireland played at Anfield, Liverpool on 2 March 1889, thus becoming Burnley's first England international. England won the match "quite comfortably" 6–1, with Yates scoring a hat trick. Despite this, he was not selected for the match against Scotland six weeks later. He is one of five players to have scored a hat-trick on his England debut, yet not make a second appearance.

He continued to make sporadic appearances for Burnley over the next few years, before retiring from playing in 1894, returning to his profession of cotton weaver.

During his later years he was landlord of the Brickmakers' Arms, a pub near to the Turf Moor ground in Burnley. He died of cancer on 1 June 1917.

== Honours ==
Blackburn Olympic

- FA Cup winners: 1883
