= Thomas Mitchell (football manager) =

Scottish football manager

Personal information
- Full name: Thomas Brown Mitchell
- Date of birth: c. 1843
- Place of birth: Dumfries, Scotland
- Date of death: August 1921

Managerial career
- Years: Team
- 1887–1896: Blackburn Rovers
- 1897–1898: Woolwich Arsenal

Thomas Brown Mitchell (c. 1843 in Dumfries – August 1921) was a two-time FA Cup winning Scottish football manager.

== Early years ==
Thomas Mitchell was born in Dumfries but moved south of the border c.1867.

== Blackburn Rovers ==
Mitchell became secretary-manager of Blackburn Rovers in 1887. The club then went on to win two FA Cups in 1890 and 1891. The final win in 1891 was against the Notts County side featuring David Calderhead.

Mitchell left Blackburn after 9 years as manager in 1896.

== Arsenal ==
Mitchell joined Woolwich Arsenal, after the club decided to appoint a professional manager following their defeat at the hands of Millwall in the FA Cup. There is some doubt over whether he was Arsenal's first- or second-ever manager; Sam Hollis is credited on the club's official website as being the club's first manager, other historical sources claim Hollis was only the club's trainer and thus Mitchell was the club's first manager – a view reinforced by the club's own official history, amongst other sources.

Regardless of whether Hollis was properly in charge of the club during his time there, Mitchell is nevertheless credited as being Arsenal's first professional manager. However, he only lasted less than a season in the job, and although the club would reach fifth in the Second Division in 1897–98, neither he nor most of his signings stayed long with the club. Mitchell resigned as Arsenal manager on 10 March 1898.

== Later years ==
Mitchell returned to Blackburn Rovers. He died in Blackburn in 1921, aged 78.

== Honours ==
Blackburn Rovers

- FA Cup: 1889–90, 1890–91

== See also ==
- List of Arsenal F.C. managers
- List of Blackburn Rovers F.C. managers
- List of FA Cup winning managers
