= Tony Parkes =

English football player and manager (1949–2026)

Personal information
- Full name: Anthony Parkes
- Date of birth: 5 May 1949
- Place of birth: Sheffield, England
- Date of death: 22 April 2026 (aged 76)
- Height: 5 ft 7 1/2 in (1.71 m)
- Position: Midfielder

Senior career*
Years	Team	Apps	(Gls)
1969–1970	Buxton		
1970–1982	Blackburn Rovers	350	(38)

Managerial career
- 1986–1987: Blackburn Rovers (caretaker)
- 1991: Blackburn Rovers (caretaker)
- 1996–1997: Blackburn Rovers (caretaker)
- 1998: Blackburn Rovers (caretaker)
- 1999–2000: Blackburn Rovers (caretaker)
- 2004: Blackburn Rovers (caretaker)
- 2008–2009: Blackpool (caretaker)
- * Club domestic league appearances and goals

Anthony Parkes (5 May 1949 – 22 April 2026) was an English professional football player and manager. He had a 34-year tenure with Blackburn Rovers as a player and coach while also stepping in as caretaker manager on six occasions.

== Playing career ==
Parkes was a midfielder who started his career in non-League football at Buxton in 1969 before moving to Blackburn Rovers in 1970 where he spent the rest of his playing career. He played a total of 350 league games and scored 38 goals for Rovers before retiring in 1982.

== Coaching career ==
After retiring as a player, Parkes stayed with Blackburn, joining their coaching staff under Bobby Saxton, where he became assistant manager. He stood in as caretaker manager for the club six times between 1986 and 2004. He took over from Bobby Saxton (December 1986 – February 1987), Don Mackay (September–October 1991), Ray Harford (October 1996 – June 1997), Roy Hodgson (November–December 1998), Brian Kidd (November 1999 – March 2000) and Graeme Souness (September 2004) after their departures.

During this time Rovers experienced something of a revolution. During his first caretaker spell, they were a struggling Second Division club who had not tasted top flight football for some 20 years. Five years later, during his second caretaker spell, they had just been taken over by local steel baron Jack Walker and were a wealthy, ambitious side building for a challenge for promotion to the new FA Premier League, which was ultimately achieved at the end of the season under new manager Kenny Dalglish. By the time of his third caretaker spell five years later, 18 months had passed since their Premier League title triumph, the club's first top division title since 1914, although their form had slumped and they did not win a league game until November. He took charge until the end of the season and kept Rovers up. His fourth spell came in November 1999, six months after relegation from the Premier League and with Rovers 19th in Division One. while Parkes hoped to secure promotion and the manager's position on a full-time basis, this time taking charge for four months until Graeme Souness was appointed manager, retaining Parkes as his assistant. When Souness moved on early in the 2004–05 season, Parkes took temporary charge again until Mark Hughes was appointed manager.

Parkes left Rovers in November 2004, after 34 years at the club, when Hughes disposed of his services in order to select his own coaching staff. Parkes criticised the club after he learned of his sacking from his daughter, who had heard the news on the radio, saying, "Usually Blackburn do it the right way, but they got it wrong. I think I deserve a bit more respect than to have my daughter telling me she's just heard it on the radio." Parkes was given a testimonial match in May 2005, a game which attracted back many former Rovers' favourites such as Alan Shearer and Colin Hendry.

Parkes became Blackpool's assistant manager in December 2005, shortly after Simon Grayson was appointed caretaker manager, and he helped the club win promotion to the Football League Championship in the 2006–07 season after a successful play-off final against Yeovil Town at Wembley. On 4 March 2008, he signed a new contract, keeping him at Bloomfield Road until 2010.

In December 2008, Parkes was installed as a caretaker manager for the seventh time in his career, after Grayson resigned from his position as Blackpool manager to join Leeds United. Blackpool's first-team coach, Steve Thompson, was promoted to the role of assistant manager. After his first game in charge, a 1–1 Boxing Day draw against Sheffield Wednesday at Hillsborough, Parkes revealed that the Blackpool board was willing to give him the job full-time, with Thompson continuing as his assistant, if the team continued to perform as they did under Grayson. Blackpool finished the 2008–09 season in 16th place in The Championship. The Blackpool board met in mid-May to discuss his position. After discussions with the club chairman Karl Oyston – resulting in a disagreement over finances – Parkes left Bloomfield Road. Parkes claimed he deserved a better deal than the one offered. "I felt the offer was unjust and there was no way that I could accept it. I don't want to cause a scene or a major problem, because I don't want to go down that road of people saying I'm bitter and twisted. We had some terrific results and some great days and they will stick with me for the rest of my life. I can't understand why I had that kind of offer after what I'd done. That will be the thing that will always concern me."

In 2010 Parkes returned to Blackburn Rovers as a scout which ultimately was his final role in football.

In December 2011 Parkes was highly critical of Venkys, Steve Kean and the Walker Trust correctly predicting that Rovers would be relegated if Kean remained as manager.

== Personal life and death ==
Parkes was diagnosed with Alzheimer's disease in 2020. The Championship league fixture between Blackburn Rovers and Blackpool on 9 April 2022 was dedicated to Parkes. Fundraising initiatives took place to help with the cost of Parkes' care by his family.

Parkes died on 22 April 2026, aged 76.

== Managerial statistics ==
Team	From	To	Record				
Team	From	To	G	W	D	L	Win %
Blackburn Rovers (caretaker)	30 December 1986	3 February 1987	6	3	2	1	50.00
Blackburn Rovers (caretaker)	2 September 1991	12 October 1991	9	5	2	2	55.56
Blackburn Rovers (caretaker)	25 October 1996	1 June 1997	30	10	11	9	33.33
Blackburn Rovers (caretaker)	21 November 1998	4 December 1998	2	0	0	2	0.00
Blackburn Rovers (caretaker)	2 November 1999	14 March 2000	26	11	8	7	42.31
Blackburn Rovers (caretaker)	6 September 2004	15 September 2004	1	0	0	1	0.00
Blackpool (caretaker)	23 December 2008	18 May 2009	23	6	9	8	26.09
Total			97	35	32	30	36.08
