= Charles Foley (cricketer) =

English cricketer and solicitor

Personal information
- Full name: Charles Windham Foley
- Born: 26 August 1856; Wadhurst, Sussex, England
- Died: 20 November 1933 (aged 77); Kensington, London, England
- Batting: Right-handed
- Role: Wicket-keeper

Domestic team information
- Years: Team
- 1880: Cambridge University
- 1891: Marylebone Cricket Club

Career statistics
Competition	First-class
Matches	7
Runs scored	51
Batting average	4.63
100s/50s	0/0
Top score	12
Catches/stumpings	7/12
- Source: Cricinfo, 22 April 2021

Charles Windham Foley (26 August 1856 – 20 November 1933) was an English first-class cricketer and solicitor.

The son of John Foley, he was born in August 1856 at Wadhurst, Sussex. He was educated at Eton College, where he was in the cricket eleven. From Eton he went up to King's College, Cambridge. He played first-class cricket for Cambridge University Cricket Club in 1880, making six appearances. He played in The University Match against Oxford University at Lord's, for which he gained his cricket blue. He played as the Cambridge wicket-keeper in these match, taking 6 catches and made 12 stumpings. As a lower-order batsman, he scored 39 with a highest score of 12. He was described by Wisden as "an average batsman". It was noted that he was a left-handed batsman until the age of 15, after which he changed to become a right-handed batsman on what Wisden described as "foolish advice". Alongside playing cricket, Foley also played football for Cambridge University A.F.C. as a full-back, for which he gained a football blue in 1880.

Foley also won an FA Cup winners' medal with the Old Etonians, playing as half-back on the winning side in the 1882 FA Cup final.

After graduating from Cambridge, Foley became a solicitor. Eleven years after he last played first-class cricket, he made a single first-class appearance for the Marylebone Cricket Club (MCC) against Somerset at Taunton in August 1891. He made scores of 0 and 12 in the match, being dismissed by Bill Roe and Gerald Fowler in the MCC first and second innings' respectively. Foley moved to British India in 1892, where he was a partner in the law firm Morgan & Co. in Calcutta until 1919. He returned to England in his later life, where he retired to Kensington. He died there in November 1933.
