= Tom Harris (football manager) =

English football manager

Tom Harris was a football manager who was Secretary/Manager of Notts County between 1893 and 1913. He was the manager when Notts won the FA Cup in 1894 beating Bolton Wanderers 4–1 at Goodison Park.
