= Nottinghamshire Guardian =

The Nottinghamshire Guardian was a newspaper in Nottinghamshire, England. The first issue of The Nottinghamshire Guardian, and Midland and Counties Advertiser appeared on 1 May 1846, and this title was retained until publication ceased in December 1969. In the 1840s, The Nottinghamshire Guardian was established by seventy of the landed gentry of the county, including the Dukes of Newcastle and Portland, with a Conservative orientation and as a leading opponent of the free trade policy of Robert Peel, in defence of agricultural, commercial and colonial interests. As the Nottinghamshire Guardian was in debt, in 1848 its owners sought the services of Thomas Forman, a skilled printer and astute businessman. In March 1849, he proposed that he pay all the costs of production, which would put the paper on a sound commercial footing, and thereafter it became effectively Thomas Forman's newspaper.

Two of his sons, John T. Forman and Jesse R. Forman, became active in the management of the newspaper from the 1870s. When Thomas Forman died in 1888, the Forman family maintained ownership of the newspaper. After Jesse Forman died in 1892, his brother John Thomas continued to manage the paper, until his death in 1916. His son, Thomas Bailey Forman, entered Thos. Forman & Sons in 1908 and subsequently took over running the newspaper.

D. H. Lawrence had a literary work published for the first time in the Nottinghamshire Guardian. He earned £3 for his short story, "A Prelude", which had won the category for the best story of a Happy Christmas in the Nottinghamshire Guardian's annual story competition of 1907. It was printed in the 7 December 1907 issue with the crosshead 'An Enjoyable Christmas: A Prelude: "Sweet is pleasure after pain..."' and under the name and address of his friend, Jessie Chambers, as Lawrence had made three entries to the competition and used her to make this entry. After his death and it has been established this was D. H. Lawrence's first printed work, the story was reprinted in the 10 December 1949 issue of the Nottinghamshire Guardian.

The Nottinghamshire Guardian is not to be confused with another local newspaper the Nottingham Daily Guardian, whose first issue Forman published on 1 July 1861.
