= Thomas Hacking =

English footballer

Personal information
- Full name: Thomas James Hacking
- Date of birth: 23 June 1857
- Place of birth: Blackburn, England
- Date of death: 21 November 1934 (aged 77)
- Place of death: Llandudno, Wales
- Position: Goalkeeper

Senior career*
Years	Team	Apps	(Gls)
1880–87	Blackburn Olympic		
- * Club domestic league appearances and goals

Thomas James Hacking (23 June 1857 - 21 November 1934) was an English footballer who was a goalkeeper for Blackburn Olympic in its FA Cup-winning side in 1883.

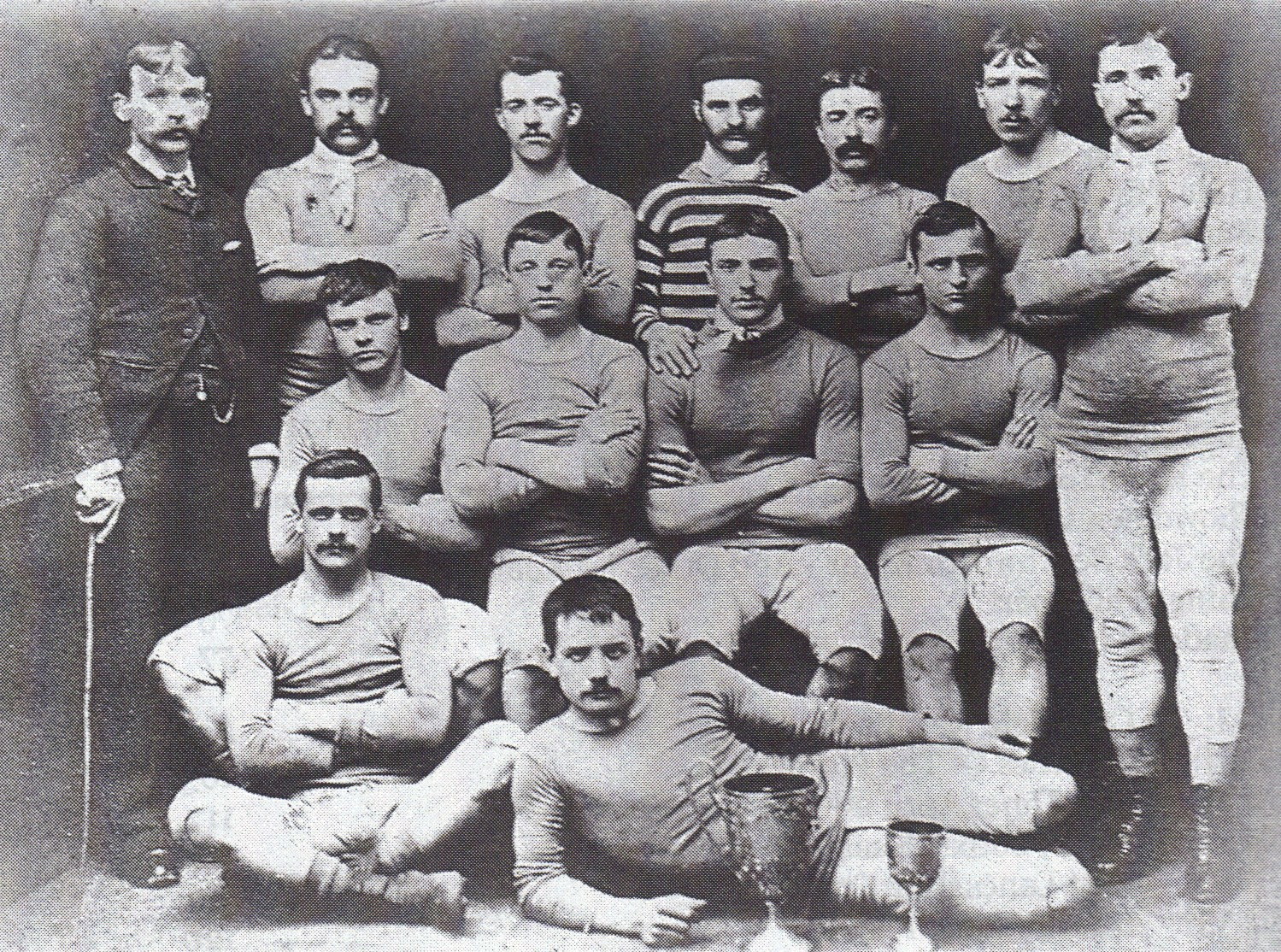
The Blackburn Olympic side in 1882, Hacking in the back row, wearing the striped jersey

== Early life ==
Hacking was born on 23 June 1857 in Blackburn, the son of William (a shoemaker) and Ellen Hacking.

He trained as a dentist, and in 1878 was one of the first tranche of dentists to register with the General Medical Council, in accordance with the Dentists Act that year, having been in practice before 22 July.

== Football career ==
Hacking's first known appearance in the game was in goal for Blackburn Olympic in a 4–1 home friendly win over Welsh Cup holders Wrexham in October 1880; from February 1881, he was the first choice in the Olympic goal, replacing Baldwin.

He appeared in the FA Cup for the first time in Olympic's second entry, in 1881–82; despite his "grand vigilance" in goal, Olympic went down 3–1 at Darwen in the first round. However he finished the season with a winners' medal in the 1881–82 East Lancashire Charity Cup, as Olympic beat Blackburn Rovers 5–2 in the final in August 1882, the final delayed significantly as Olympic successfully protested its defeat to Accrington on the basis that the Owd Reds had fielded an ineligible player.

His second season in the FA Cup, in 1882–83, saw Olympic win the Cup, in large part to Hacking's performance in the 1883 FA Cup final against the Old Etonians, especially in the last minute when he ran out of goal to tackle Macaulay when he had gone clean through.

Despite this national success, the Light Blues had less success on a local level. Hacking missed the 1882-83 East Lancashire Charity Cup final against Blackburn Rovers, which perhaps explains why Rovers won 6–2. Rovers also beat Olympic in the Lancashire Senior Cup finals of 1884 and 1885, Hacking only playing in the first final. Hacking was credited with a goal in the 18–0 win over Leigh Association in the first round in the 1884–85 tournament, not touching the ball all match, other than when he went upfield for a corner; Hacking actually punched the ball home, the referee deciding that that was "in defence of his own goal", although the Football Association later clarified that goalkeepers could only handle the ball in their own half.

Hacking refused to turn professional, his final FA Cup match coming in a 3–2 defeat to the now-dominant - and much better-backed - Rovers in 1884–85, and had more or less retired from the game by 1885; he was registered as an amateur player only for the 1885–86 season. He nearly came out of retirement to help Olympic after replacement goalkeeper Southworth had been deemed ineligible for the 1885–86 FA Cup, but a death in the family meant he had to withdraw from the first-round tie with Church, and the Olympic duly went out.

His final games for the Olympic were in friendly matches in the 1886–87 season. His very last match in Olympic colours was in a match between former players of the Olympic and the Rovers in March 1892, in front of nearly 4,000 at Ewood Park, for the benefit of former Olympic chairman John Dixon, although he only played for the first half.

Hacking never played international football, but he did represent the Lancashire Association in inter-county matches between 1881 and 1884.

== Post-football ==
Hacking worked as a dentist in Blackburn until he retired to run a boarding establishment in Llandudno called "Stratford", on Craig-y-Don Parade, in 1922. He died there on 21 November 1934. He was survived by his two daughters.
