= Albert Warburton =

English footballer

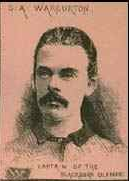
Albert Walburton

Squire Albert Warburton (26 January 1856 – 24 November 1925) was an English footballer in the Victorian era, born in Oldham, Lancashire. "Squire" was not a title but his actual first name, although he was known by his middle name.

Warburton was the captain of the Blackburn Olympic team which defeated Old Etonians in the 1883 FA Cup Final played at Kennington Oval on 31 March 1883. This was the first occasion on which a working-class team from the north of England had won the cup, which had previously been won solely by teams of wealthy amateurs from London and the south. At a civic reception upon the team's return to Blackburn, Warburton reportedly proclaimed "The Cup is very welcome to Lancashire. It'll have a good home and it'll never go back to London".

In the match report in the Blackburn Times on 6 April 1883, Warburton was described as a "Master plumber; also pub landlord and poulterer". He was working as a publican at the time of the First World War. He died on 24 November 1925, with the death registered in Blackburn.
