= Jimmy Ward (footballer, born 1865) =

English footballer

James Ward (28 March 1865 – 25 August 1941) was a semi-professional footballer who was part of the Blackburn Olympic team which won the FA Cup in 1883, playing at left back. On 14 March 1885, he played for England, his only international appearance, in a 1–1 draw with Wales. Ward was a cotton weaver by trade.
