= Blackburn Olympic F.C. =

Association football club in England

Blackburn Olympic
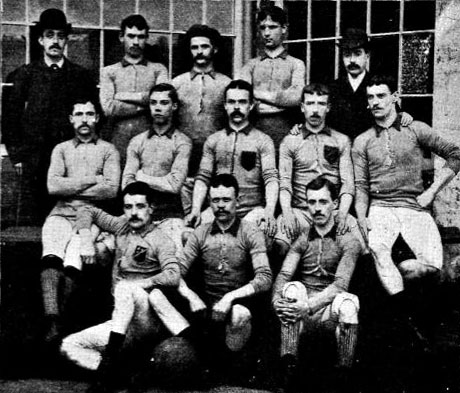
- The Blackburn Olympic team which won the FA Cup in 1883.
- Full name: Blackburn Olympic Football Club
- Nickname: The Light Blues
- Founded: 1878
- Dissolved: 1889; 137 years ago
- Ground: Hole-i'-th'-Wall; Blackburn
- League: None (1878–1888); The Combination (1888–1889)
Home colours	Away colours

Blackburn Olympic Football Club was an English football club based in Blackburn, Lancashire in the late 19th century. Although the club was only in existence for just over a decade, it is significant in the history of football in England as the first club from the north of the country and the first from a working-class background to win the country's leading competition, the Football Association Challenge Cup (FA Cup). The cup had previously been won only by teams of wealthy amateurs from the home counties, and Olympic's victory marked a turning point in the sport's transition from a pastime for upper-class gentlemen to a professional sport.

The club was formed in 1878 and initially took part only in minor local competitions. In 1880, the club entered the FA Cup for the first time, and three years later defeated Old Etonians at Kennington Oval to win the trophy. Olympic, however, proved unable to compete with wealthier and better-supported clubs in the new professional era, and folded in 1889.

Most of Olympic's home matches took place at the Hole-i'-th'-Wall stadium, named after an adjacent public house. From 1880 onwards, the club's first-choice colours consisted of light blue shirts and white shorts. One Olympic player, James Ward, was selected for the England team and six other former or future England internationals played for the club, including Jack Hunter, who was the club's coach at the time of Olympic's FA Cup win.

== History ==
=== Formation and early years ===
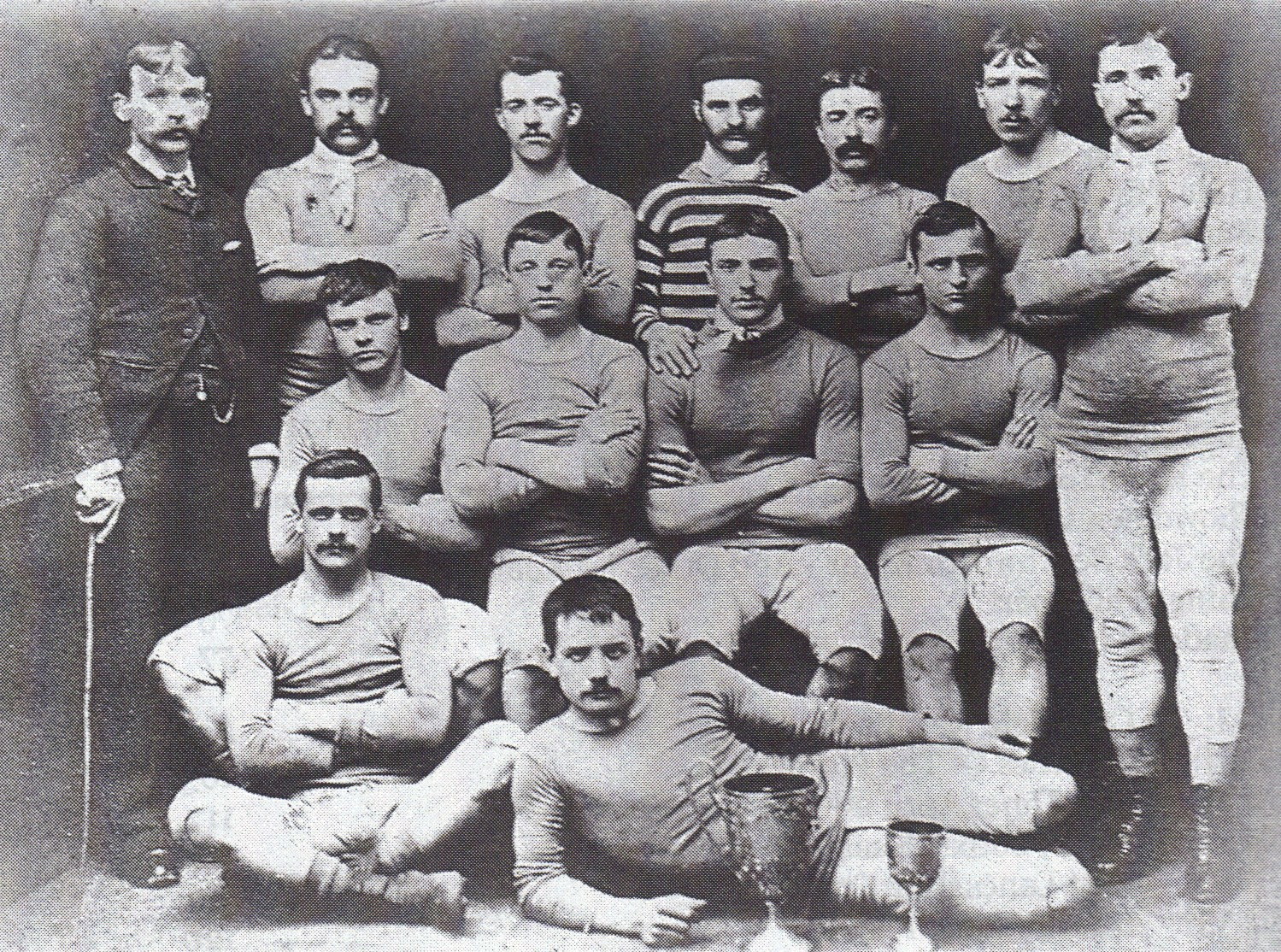
The Olympic players of 1882 display the two trophies the club won in the first four years of its existence.

Association football was first codified in the 1860s in the south of England and played by teams of upper-class former public school pupils and Oxbridge graduates. However, the game spread to the industrial towns of the north by the following decade. The town of Blackburn in Lancashire had more than a dozen active football clubs by 1877, with Blackburn Rovers, founded in 1875, generally viewed as the leading team. Blackburn Olympic F.C. was founded in February 1878 when two of these clubs, Black Star and James Street, opted to merge. The name was chosen by James Edmondson, the club's first treasurer, and is believed to have been inspired by the recent excavation of Olympia, site of the ancient Olympic Games. The new club's first match was a friendly played on 9 February 1878 which resulted in a 2–0 win over local team St. John's.

In April 1878, the club entered its first competition, the Livesey United Cup. Olympic beat St. Mark's in the final to win the tournament, and, as the competition was not held again, the club retained the trophy in perpetuity. Over the next two seasons the club continued to play friendly matches and also entered the Blackburn Association Challenge Cup, a knock-out tournament open to all local clubs set up by the organisation which governed football within the town. Olympic won the cup in both 1879 and 1880, after which the competition was discontinued when the Blackburn Association was absorbed into the larger Lancashire County Football Association. As with the Livesey United Cup, the trophy remained in Olympic's possession for the remainder of the club's existence.

In 1880 the club's committee decided that Olympic should compete for greater prizes, and opted to enter two further competitions, the Lancashire Senior Cup and the Football Association Challenge Cup (FA Cup), the country's premier football competition. In the club's first FA Cup match, the "Light Blues" were defeated 5–4 by Sheffield, and the following season the team again lost in the first round, away to Darwen. The club's reputation within its home area was growing, however, and matches were now being arranged with teams from further afield, such as Sheffield Wednesday, Nottingham Forest, and even Scottish clubs such as Cowlairs and Hibernian. The club's increasing expenses were met with the help of Sydney Yates, a local iron foundry owner, who invested a large amount of money and continued to bankroll the club for most of its existence. At the end of the 1881–82 season, Olympic defeated Blackburn Rovers to win the East Lancashire Charity Cup.

=== Success ===
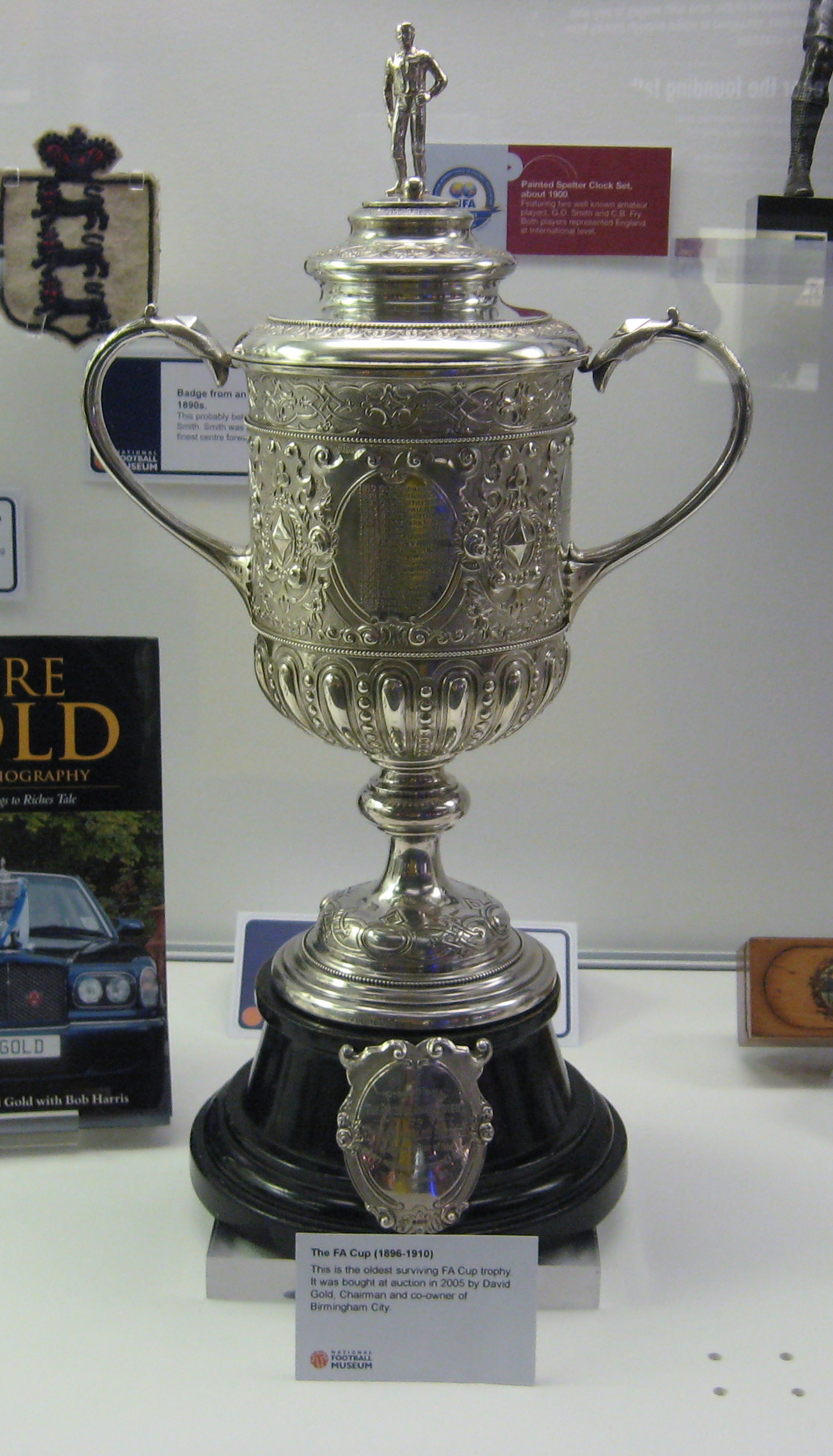
The second FA Cup trophy, pictured here, is identical in design to that won by Olympic in 1883. The original trophy was stolen in 1895 and never recovered

In the 1882–83 FA Cup, Olympic defeated four other Lancashire clubs, Accrington, Lower Darwen, Darwen Ramblers, and Church, to reach the fifth round. At this stage the "Light Blues" were drawn to play Welsh team Druids. Olympic defeated the Ruabon-based team 4–1 to progress to the semi-final stage, where for the first time they faced opponents from the south of England — Old Carthusians. The Carthusians, the team for former pupils of Charterhouse School, had won the cup two years earlier and even the local newspapers in Blackburn considered them strong favourites to reach the final again. Olympic, however, won 4–0 in a match played at a neutral venue in Whalley Range, Manchester, to set up a match with another of the great amateur teams, Old Etonians, in the final at Kennington Oval. The Etonians had defeated Olympic's close rivals Blackburn Rovers in the final a year earlier, the first time a northern team had reached the final.

Before the final, former England player Jack Hunter, who had joined the club in 1882 in the twin roles of player and coach, arranged to take the team to Blackpool for several days' special training. Such an undertaking had never before been made by a club, and it was considered an extremely novel idea.

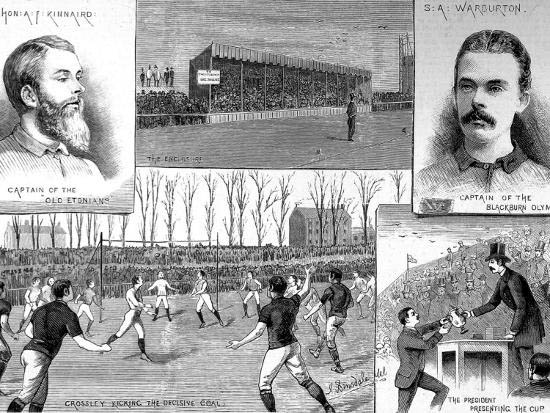
Illustration of the 1883 FA Cup final depicting teams' captains and venue (above), the match and the prize giving ceremony (below)

The Etonians took the lead in the final when Harry Goodhart scored during the first half, however Alfred Matthews equalised for Olympic in the second half. Soon afterwards, Arthur Dunn was injured and forced to leave the field, reducing the Etonians to ten men for the rest of the match. The scores remained level at the end of the regulation ninety minutes. Under the regulations of the FA Cup, thirty minutes of extra time could be played in the event of a draw, at the referee's discretion, and in response to the fervent mood of the crowd the captains asked to play on to try to secure a result. During the extra period, Olympic's superior stamina began to show. Around twenty minutes into extra time, Jimmy Costley received a pass from John Yates and kicked the ball past Etonian goalkeeper John Rawlinson to score the winning goal. Upon the team's return to Blackburn, the players took part in a celebratory parade and received a civic reception at which team captain Albert Warburton reportedly proclaimed "The Cup is very welcome to Lancashire. It'll have a good home and it'll never go back to London." Olympic were the first team from a working-class background to win the FA Cup.

In the south, however, Olympic's victory over one of the great amateur teams provoked consternation. At the time, The Football Association (the FA), the sport's governing body, prohibited clubs from paying their players. Despite this, working-class clubs, especially those based in Lancashire, had been widely suspected of making illicit payments to players since at least 1876. In the wake of Olympic's high-profile victory, journalists and officials affiliated with southern amateur clubs intensified their calls for the FA to investigate the finances of northern clubs. They focussed in particular on Olympic's training excursion to Blackpool, suggesting that the players would not have been able to take so much time off work unless the club was paying them some form of wage. Questions were also asked about players who had relocated from one town to another seemingly for the sole purpose of playing for a new football team. In Olympic's case Jack Hunter had moved from Sheffield to join the club. Ultimately no action was taken against Olympic, although punishments were imposed on other clubs, including Preston North End, who were expelled from the FA Cup. This in turn prompted the northern clubs to make plans to break away from the FA and form a rival governing body which would not impose the so-called "amateur ideal" on clubs.

=== Decline and collapse ===
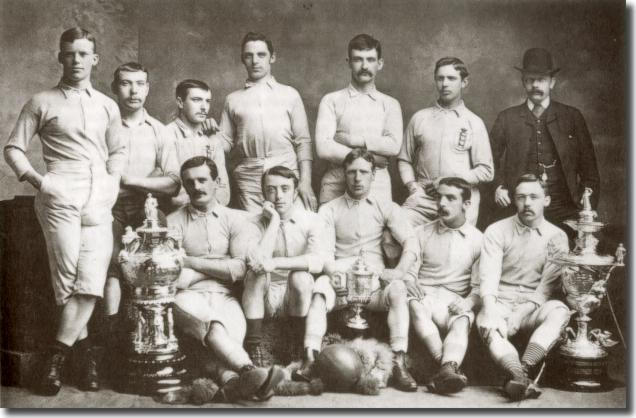
Olympic's local rivals Blackburn Rovers won the FA Cup for the first time in 1884 and quickly became the town's leading club.

The following season, Olympic again reached the semi-finals of the FA Cup, as did Blackburn Rovers. When the draw for the semi-finals was made, Olympic were paired with Queen's Park in one match and Rovers with Notts County in the other, setting up the possibility of the two teams meeting in the final. The Olympic team, however, were outclassed and defeated 4–0 by their Scottish opponents. The club lodged an appeal with the FA based on the encroachment onto the pitch of some of the 16,000 spectators, but to no avail. Rovers went on to defeat Queen's Park in the final.

The club was never again able to achieve this level of success. In the 1884–85 season, Olympic lost in the second round of the FA Cup to rivals Rovers, who went on to cement their position as the town's leading team by winning the competition for the second consecutive season. The threat of a schism within the sport was averted in 1885 when the FA agreed to legalise professionalism. In a town the size of Blackburn, however, Olympic found it hard to compete for spectators and sponsors with the longer-established and more successful Rovers, and as a result could not pay wages on a par with those offered by that club or by other professional clubs in Lancashire. In 1886 the club's committee was forced to reduce the players' wages to a quarter of what was being offered by Preston North End. Many of the team's key players walked out in response and were quickly signed by wealthier clubs.

The Football League, the world's first association football league, was formed in 1888 by the leading clubs of the Midlands and North. Aston Villa chairman William McGregor, the driving force behind the new competition, put in place a rule stating that only one club from each town or city could join, and chose Rovers, rather than Olympic, to be Blackburn's entrant. Some of the clubs not invited to join the League, including Olympic, formed The Combination, but this was a poorly organised competition which attracted only small crowds and collapsed before the end of the 1888–89 season. Beset by heavy debts, the club's committee announced in early 1889 that all professional players were being released from their contracts with immediate effect and that henceforth the club would employ only amateur players. This desperate measure came too late to save the club, which closed down in September 1889. Blackburn Olympic's last match was a defeat away to Everton.

== Stadia and supporters ==
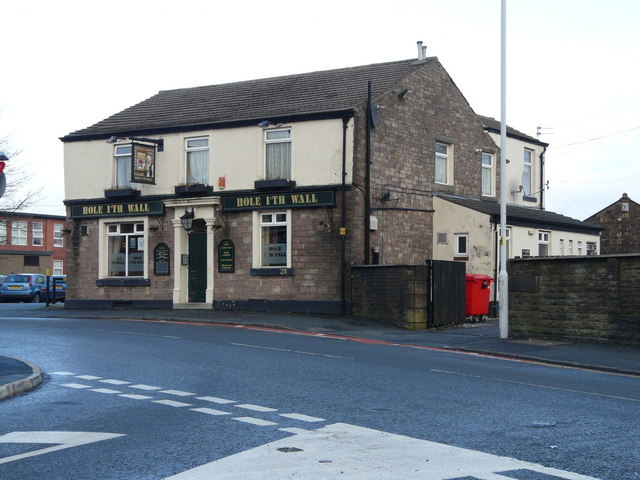
A modern view of the Hole-i'-th'-Wall pub, which gave its name to the club's home stadium

Olympic's first match took place on a pitch owned by the Blackburn Cricket Club, situated in open countryside at Higher Oozebooth. For the first eighteen months of the club's existence, Olympic played home matches at various sites in Blackburn, including Roe Lee and Cob Wall. In 1879 the club's committee secured the lease on a pitch adjacent to the Hole-i'-th'-Wall public house, at the top of the Shear Brow hill. The site had previously been used by another club, Queen's Own, but had been left vacant when that club folded after most of its players defected to Blackburn Rovers.

The playing surface sloped downwards and was initially known for being exceptionally muddy, but in 1880 the club's committee spent £100 improving the drainage. Facilities were minimal and most spectators simply stood around the perimeter of the pitch, as was the case at most football grounds at the time. A grandstand was erected behind one goal in 1881, but it was severely damaged in a storm in 1884 and was replaced by a more elaborate structure along one of the long sides of the playing area. At the same time several other shelters were erected to give spectators in other areas cover from the elements. The largest crowd registered at Hole-i'-th'-Wall was approximately 10,000 for a match against Preston North End in November 1884, but crowds of between 1,000 and 2,000 spectators were the norm at Olympic matches. After the club's demise the pitch was taken over by the Blackburn Railway Clerks Club. It later became the site of St. Mary's College, which closed in 2022.

== Colours ==
At the start of the club's existence, the players usually wore magenta shirts, although the rules regarding kits were less rigid at the time, and half-back Tommy Gibson insisted on wearing a supposedly lucky amber and black hooped shirt, a practice later copied by teammate Alf Astley. When the club entered the FA Cup for the first time in 1880, competition regulations meant that all the players in the team had to wear matching colours, and a new combination of light blue shirts and white shorts was chosen. When there was a clash of colours with the opposition and Olympic were the team obliged to change, the players wore dark blue shirts and white shorts. There is no record of the club having a badge or crest, although photographs of the FA Cup-winning team show several players with the crest of the Lancashire FA sewn onto their shirts, indicating that they had represented Lancashire in inter-county matches.

== Players ==
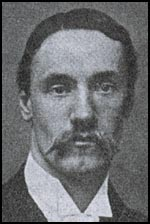
Jack Southworth went on to play for England after his time at Olympic.

The club's FA Cup winning team of 1883 comprised eleven players born in England, the first time an all-English XI had won the competition. The team lined up as follows:

Position	Player(s)
Goalkeeper	Thomas Hacking
Backs	James Ward, Albert Warburton
Half-backs	Thomas Gibson, Jack Hunter, William Astley
Forwards	Thomas Dewhurst, Alfred Matthews, George Wilson, Jimmy Costley, John Yates

James Ward was the only player to be selected for the England team while on the books of the club. He won one cap, against Wales in 1885. Tommy Dewhurst was originally chosen for an international match in 1884, but was deselected after he was involved in a fight with an opposition player during a match between Olympic and Northwich Victoria. Six other Olympic players represented England either before or after their time with the club: Joe Beverley, Edgar Chadwick, Jack Hunter, Jack Southworth, William Townley and John Yates.

== Officials ==
The concept of a football manager did not exist in the 19th century, although some modern sources identify Jack Hunter as having been the team's manager. Hunter's main responsibility was for the coaching of the players, although in the club's later years he also took charge of seeking out and signing promising amateur players. The club's benefactor, Sydney Yates, held the post of president and his brother Fred served as chairman of the club's committee. The majority of the administration of the club was handled by the secretary, a post held for most of the club's existence by Bill Bramham.

== Honours ==
The club won the following trophies:

FA Cup

- 1883

East Lancashire Charity Cup

- 1882

Blackburn Association Challenge Cup

- 1879, 1880

Livesey United Cup

- 1878

The only competition the club entered but never won, other than the unfinished Combination, was the Lancashire Senior Cup.

== Rivalries ==
Blackburn Olympic's chief rivalry was with Blackburn Rovers. The first match between the two clubs was a game in February 1879, which resulted in a 3–1 win for Olympic. The clubs played each other forty times, but Olympic won only six of these matches. The rivalry became especially fierce in September 1884, when, amid accusations that the clubs were using underhand tactics in attempts to "poach" each other's star players, the Rovers' secretary sent a telegram to his opposite number stating that his club would play no matches against Olympic in the 1884–85 season. In December, however, the clubs were drawn against each other in the FA Cup, and matches between the rivals resumed later that season. Their final meeting was a benefit match for Olympic in February 1889, which Rovers won 6–1. Rovers agreed to allow the financially embarrassed Olympic to keep all available gate money, instead of sharing it.

== In popular culture ==
A Blackburn-based team and its victory in the 1883 FA Cup final is the focus of the 2020 Netflix mini-series The English Game, although the club is only referred to as "Blackburn" and includes players who, although genuine, did not actually play for Olympic.

== Bibliography ==
- Davies, Hunter (2003). Boots, Balls and Haircuts: An Illustrated History of Football from Then to Now. Cassell Illustrated. ISBN 1-84403-261-2.
- Phythian, Graham (2007). Shooting Stars: The Brief and Glorious History of Blackburn Olympic 1878–1889. SoccerData. ISBN 978-1-899468-83-6.
- Soar, Phil; Tyler, Martin (1983). Encyclopedia of British Football. Willow Books. ISBN 0-00-218049-9.
- Warsop, Keith (2004). The Early FA Cup Finals and the Southern Amateurs. SoccerData. ISBN 1-899468-78-1.
