= Thomas Gibson (footballer) =

English footballer

Personal information
- Full name: Thomas Gibson
- Date of birth: 24 November 1853
- Place of birth: Blackburn, England
- Date of death: 1924
- Place of death: Blackburn
- Position: Half-back

Senior career*
Years	Team	Apps	(Gls)
1877–89	Blackburn Olympic		
1889	Heywood Central		
- * Club domestic league appearances and goals

Thomas "Tommy" Kenyon Gibson was an English footballer who played for Blackburn Olympic in its FA Cup-winning side in 1883.

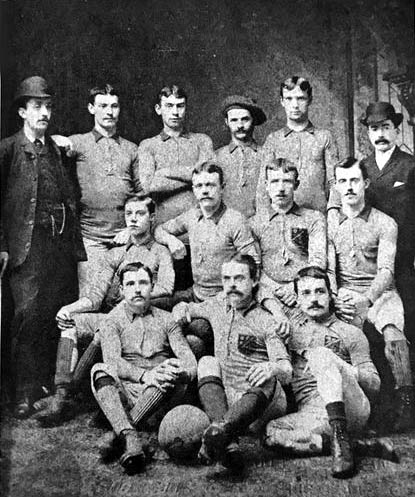
The Olympic Cup-winning team; Gibson is at the bottom left

== Career ==
Gibson was born in Blackburn, the son of William (an iron moulder) and Alice, and lived his whole life in the town.

His working life was as an iron dresser at the iron foundry owned by Sidney Yates, who was behind funding the Blackburn Olympic team, and Gibson was one of the Olympians' founding players in 1877, although his earliest recorded appearance for the Olympians was in a 6–1 win over Bolton Olympic at the Hole i'the Wall Ground in September 1879,

In his first matches for the club, nine of the Olympic players wore magenta jerseys, but Gibson insisted on wearing an amber and black jersey, and his fellow half-back Alf Astley (who coached the 1883 Cup-winning side) joined him in wearing similar colours. He played in the Olympians' first FA Cup tie, a 5–4 defeat at Sheffield in the 1880–81 FA Cup.

In June 1882, Gibson was made temporary captain of the Light Blues for the season, as his predecessor Joe Beverley was forced by his work to move to Northwich. The Olympians changed tactic around this time from 2–2–6 (which, in practice, was a 2–2–3–3, with forwards playing in pairs) to 2–3–5, by withdrawing one of the two centre-forwards; Gibson's pace was considered crucial to make this tactical innovation work, to the extent that, when it was rumoured that Gibson would be leaving, it was thought Olympic would be forced to revert to its earlier formation. He immediately had success as captain as the Light Blues won the 1881–82 East Lancashire Charity Cup in August, as Olympic beat Blackburn Rovers 5–2 in the final in August 1882, the final delayed significantly as Olympic had successfully protested its defeat to Accrington on the basis that the Owd Reds had fielded an ineligible player.

This foreshadowed the Olympic's greatest achievement as it won the 1882–83 FA Cup. Gibson had a starring role in the club's victory over Old Etonians in the final.

After his FA Cup winners' medal, Gibson collected a number of runner-up medals. He played in the Olympic side which lost the 1883 Lancashire Charity Cup final 6–2 to Blackburn Rovers, and that which lost the final of both the 1884 and 1885 Lancashire Senior Cup, both to Rovers. He was also one of the players in the 4–0 defeat to Accrington in the 1885 East Lancashire Charity Cup final.

The richer backing that Rovers had gradually ground Olympic down. In February 1886 the club resolved to put a cap of 10/6 per week on player wages, and by the 1886–87 season, only Gibson and "Tich" Parker remained from the Olympic glory days, a slowing Gibson stepping back to full-back. Gibson indeed stayed loyal to the Light Blues right to the end, playing in the club's brief Combination tenure (including its final match - a defeat to South Shore), and was still a player as the club broke up in 1889. On the club's demise, he joined Heywood Central, his final recorded match for the club being at Nelson in February 1890.

== Personal life ==
Gibson married Annie in 1880 and the couple had at least six daughters and two sons. He died in 1924, aged 70.
