= Will Scott =

English footballer and manager (1893–1972)

Personal information
- Full name: William Scott
- Date of birth: 1893
- Place of birth: Willington Quay, England
- Date of death: 1972 (aged 78–79)
- Position: Forward

Managerial career
- Years: Team
- 1947: Blackburn Rovers
- 1949–1953: Preston North End

William Scott (1893–1972) was an English footballer and football manager who managed in England in the 1940s and 1950s.

Scott began his career as an amateur with South Shields prior to the First World War, but joined the Navy in 1914. He guested for Crystal Palace during the war and was offered a professional contract with Palace when the war ended. However, he chose to remain as an amateur with South Shields where he was assistant manager and masseur in addition to being a player.

In January 1923, Shields' manager Jimmy Lawrence left to manage Preston North End with Scott joining him as trainer. He continued in that role until March 1941, when he became club secretary, leaving in April 1947 to become manager of Blackburn Rovers. His term at Blackburn was cut short when he fell ill, and in his time in charge between March and the start of December 1947, Blackburn Rovers struggled, winning just 8 and losing 16 of his 28 games. Despite his ill health, he remained with the club as a scout.

Having recovered from illness, Scott became manager of Preston in June 1949. Preston won 78, lost 49 and drew 36 of his 163 matches at the helm. He led Preston to the Second Division title in the 1950–51 season and when he left in March 1953 Preston were challenging for the Football League title, eventually finishing as runners-up on goal average.

He was later assistant manager of Sunderland.
