= Jack Hunter (English footballer) =

English footballer

John Hunter (13 August 1851 – 9 April 1903) was an English footballer who won the FA Cup with Blackburn Olympic in 1883 and made seven appearances for England between 1878 and 1882 playing at half back.

== Career ==
Hunter was born in Crookes, Nether Hallam, Sheffield, West Riding of Yorkshire on 13 August 1851 and worked as a butcher and silver cutler in the city whilst playing for various clubs, including Heeley, Providence, Sheffield Albion and The Zulus.

He won all his England caps whilst playing for Sheffield Heeley, a club he originally joined in 1870.

In 1877 he played for Druids in their FA Cup match against Queen's Park at Hampden Park, Glasgow.

His first international appearance was at Hampden Park, Glasgow against Scotland on 2 March 1878. Although England "fielded a side they thought capable of defeating the Scots, ...(they) returned home with a humiliating 7–2 defeat". He was next selected in March 1880 for matches away to Scotland (lost 5–4) and Wales which resulted in a 3–2 victory; this was Hunter's only victory in his seven England appearances.

He was again selected the following year for the two home internationals. In the match against Wales, played at Alexandra Meadows, Blackburn on 26 February 1881, he was appointed captain, but Wales achieved their first victory on English soil with a 1–0 success. For the following game, Hunter retained his place but the captaincy moved to Norman Bailey. In the match, played at Kennington Oval, London on 12 March 1881, England suffered yet another "humiliating" defeat as the Scots returned home with a 6–1 victory.

Despite England's poor performances against the Scots, Hunter was again selected for the international matches in March 1882. In both these matches, England conceded five goals going down 5–1 at Hampden Park, Glasgow on 11 March and 5–3 at the Racecourse Ground, Wrexham two days later. These two defeats brought Hunter's international career to a close.

After a short spell with The Wednesday, Hunter was appointed manager of a public house in Blackburn where he joined the Olympic in 1882 as both player and coach. Blackburn Olympic had been founded in August 1877 and soon evolved into one of the finest sides in Lancashire. Hunter, an astute coach and tactician, taught the Olympic players the art of the passing game. Hunter coached a team of tradesmen and weavers to overcome the dominance of local rivals, Blackburn Rovers, and the amateur teams of southern England to win the FA Cup in 1883.

It was Hunter who decided to take the team to Blackpool for a few days' relaxation prior to the final, which had been unheard of previously. In the final (against Old Etonians played on 31 March 1883 at the Kennington Oval), Hunter played at centre half and marshalled the defence, who were able to keep the Old Etonians forwards at bay thus allowing the fitter Olympics side to come from behind to claim the cup with a 2–1 victory after extra time. Hunter's delight at the triumph was demonstrated by his shouting, as he collected his medal, "fifteen years at football, and got the English cup at the finish".

Hunter remained with Olympic until 1887, before joining Blackburn Rovers. After a short spell playing for Rovers, Hunter became assistant trainer and groundsman at Ewood Park, as well as working as a licensee in Blackburn.

From 1897 Hunter had a short spell as coach to Cheshire side New Brighton Tower, helping that team rise from the Lancashire League to a brief sojourn in the Football League.

He died of consumption on 9 April 1903, and was buried in Blackburn Cemetery.

== Honours ==
Blackburn Olympic

- FA Cup: Winner 1883
