= Whitfield (surname) =

- Pronunciation: /ˈwɪtfiːld/
- Language: English

Origin
- Languages: Old English, German, Ashkenazi Jewish
- Derivation: hwit + feld (Old English)
- Meaning: white/chalky + open lands
- Region of origin: England

Whitfield is a surname of Old English and Anglo-Saxon origins deriving from hwit (white or chalky) and feld (open lands). It can also be an Americanized or Anglicised form of the German and Ashkenazi Jewish surname Weissfeld, composed of the elements weiss 'white' and feld 'field'.

Persons with the surname include:

- Allan George Williams Whitfield (1909–1987), English physician
- Andrew Whitfield (politician) (born 1982), South African politician
- Andrew Carnegie Whitfield (born 1910, disappeared 1938), nephew of steel magnate Andrew Carnegie who disappeared in New York in 1938
- Andy Whitfield (1971–2011), Welsh-Australian actor
- Anne Whitfield, American actress
- Arthur Whitfield (1868–1947), English physician and professor of medicine
- Barrence Whitfield (born 1955), American soul and R&B vocalist and bandleader
- Bob Whitfield (born 1971), American football player
- Brent Whitfield (born 1981), American soccer player
- Charles Whitfield (disambiguation)
- Clare Whitfield (born 1978), English writer
- David Whitfield (1925–1980), British singer
- Dondré Whitfield (born 1969), American actor
- Dwayne Whitfield (born 1972), American basketball player
- Ed Whitfield (born 1943), American politician
- Evan Whitfield (born 1977), American soccer player
- Fred Whitfield (baseball) (1938–2013), American baseball player
- Fred Whitfield (rodeo) (born 1967), American calf roper
- Fredricka Whitfield (born 1965), American news anchor
- Garnell Whitfield (born 1957), American politician
- Henry L. Whitfield (1868–1927), American politician and Mississippi governor
- Jack Whitfield (1892–1927), Welsh rugby union player
- James Whitfield (disambiguation)
- John Whitfield (disambiguation)
- June Whitfield (1925–2018), English comedy actress
- Ken Whitfield (1930–1995), English footballer
- Kermit Whitfield (born 1993), American football player
- Lynn Whitfield (born 1953), American actress
- Mark Whitfield (born 1967), American jazz guitarist
- Martin Whitfield (born 1965), Scottish politician
- Mal Whitfield (1924–2015), American track athlete
- Mitchell Whitfield (born 1964), American actor
- Norman Whitfield (1940–2008), American songwriter and producer
- Norman Whitfield (footballer) (1896–1962), English footballer
- Robert Parr Whitfield (1828–1910), American paleontologist
- Robin Whitfield (1943–2025), English rugby league referee
- Shelby Whitfield (1935–2013), American sportscaster
- Simon Whitfield (born 1975), Canadian triathlon athlete
- Stephen Whitfield (disambiguation)
- Thomas Whitfield (disambiguation)
- Terry Whitfield (born 1953), American baseball player
- Trent Whitfield (born 1977), Canadian ice hockey player
- Vantile Whitfield (1930–2005), American arts administrator
- Wesla Whitfield (1947–2018), American singer
- Wilf Whitfield (1916–1995), English footballer

== See also ==
- General Whitfield (disambiguation)
- Governor Whitfield (disambiguation)
- Justice Whitfield (disambiguation)
- William Henry Whitfeld (1856–1915), English mathematician
- Whitfield (disambiguation)
- Whitefield (disambiguation), sometimes spelled Whitfield
