= Whitefield =

Whitefield may refer to:

== Places ==
=== India ===
- Whitefield, Bengaluru, a neighbourhood of Bengaluru
  - Whitefield railway station (Bengaluru)
  - Whitefield (Kadugodi) metro station

=== United Kingdom ===
- Whitefield, Dorset, England, a United Kingdom location
- Whitefield, Greater Manchester, England
  - Whitefield tram stop
- Whitefield, Perthshire, Scotland, birthplace of the writer James Browne
- Whitefield, Somerset, England, a United Kingdom location

=== United States ===
- Whitefield, Illinois, an unincorporated community
- Whitefield, Maine, a town
- Whitefield, New Hampshire, a town
  - Whitefield (CDP), New Hampshire, a census-designated place and main village in the town
- Whitefield, Oklahoma, a town
- Whitefield Township, Marshall County, Illinois
- Whitefield Township, Kandiyohi County, Minnesota

== People ==
- Whitefield (surname), a list of people
- Whitefield Bentley (1884–1952), Canadian politician
- Whitefield J. McKinlay (1852–1941), American teacher, state legislator and real estate businessman

== Schools ==
- Whitefield College (disambiguation)
- Whitefield Academy (disambiguation)
- Whitefield School, a secondary school and sixth form in the London Borough of Barnet
- Whitefield Schools, a special school in Walthamstow in the London Borough of Waltham Forest
- Whitefield Christian Schools, Toronto, Ontario, Canada

== See also ==
- Whitefield F.C., a 19th century association football team from Govan, Scotland
- Whitefield Park, a former football ground in Cambuslang, Scotland
- Whitfield (disambiguation)
