= Whitfeld =

Whitfeld is a surname. Notable people with the surname include:

- Francis Whitfeld (1852–1924), English cricketer
- George Whitfeld (1878–1945), English cricketer, nephew of Herbert
- Herbert Whitfeld (1858–1909), English amateur sportsman

== See also ==
- Whitfield (disambiguation)
