= Whitfield =

Whitfield may refer to:

== Places ==
=== Australia ===
- Whitfield, Queensland, a suburb of Cairns
- Whitfield, Victoria, an agricultural township

=== England ===
- Whitfield, Derbyshire, a hamlet and former parish
- Whitfield, Gloucestershire, a hamlet
- Whitfield, Herefordshire
- Whitfield, Kent, a village, civil parish and electoral ward
- Whitfield, Northamptonshire, a village and parish
- Whitfield, Northumberland, a village and former civil parish

=== Ireland ===
- Whitfield, Waterford

=== Scotland ===
- Whitfield, Dundee, a residential, social-housing scheme located to the north of Dundee, Scotland

=== United States ===
- Whitfield, Manatee County, Florida, an unincorporated community and census-designated place
- Whitfield, Santa Rosa County, Florida, an unincorporated community and census-designated place
- Whitfield, Indiana, an unincorporated community
- Whitfield, Kansas, a ghost town
- Whitfield, Kentucky, an unincorporated community
- Whitfield, Jones County, Mississippi, an unincorporated community
- Whitfield, Rankin County, Mississippi, an unincorporated community
- Whitfield, Pennsylvania, a census-designated place
- Whitfield, Tennessee, an unincorporated community
- Whitfield, Virginia, an unincorporated community
- Whitfield County, Georgia

== People ==
- Whitfield (surname), including a list of people
- Whitfield (given name), a list of people
- Whitfield family, a Norman family of landowners in Northumberland, England
- Whitfield family of the United States, an American South political family, a cadet branch of the Whitfield family

== Schools ==
- Whitfield School, Creve Coeur, Missouri, a private prep school
- Whitfield High School, original name of Braeview Academy, Dundee, Scotland

== Transportation ==
- Whitfield Street, London Borough of Camden
- Whitfield railway line, a former railway in Victoria, Australia
  - Whitfield railway station, the terminus railway station for the Whitfield railway line

== Other uses ==
- The Whitfield Prize, awarded annually by the Royal Historical Society
- Whitfield Records, a record label
- Whitfield Barracks, Hong Kong, a former barracks

== See also ==
- Whitfield v. United States, a United States Supreme Court case
- R. v. Whitfield, a Supreme Court of Canada case
- Whitefield (disambiguation)
- Whitfeld
