= Whitfield family =

Whitfield Family
- Current region: Northumberland
- Etymology: hwit+feld
- Origin: Whitfield, Northumberland
- Estate: Whitfield Hall

The Whitfield family was a landowning Norman family in present-day United Kingdom; the family was seated at Whitfield Hall in Northumberland. The area was granted by William, King of Scotland in the twelfth century. The family derives its name from the old English hwit-feld, meaning open white lands.

== Background ==
In the early 14th century, Richard Whitfield, Lord of Whitfield Hall in Whitfield, Northumberland married heiress Isabel Vipont, who was widow of Roger de Clifford, 2nd Baron de Clifford. Robert died in 1331, by which time the family held land in Northumberland, Durham, Cumberland, Norfolk and Sussex. Richard Whitfield, of Whitfield Hall living in 1332, was father of Robert de Whitfield, of Whitfield Hall, living 1370. His son, Matthew de Whitfield, was father of John Whitfield, who married Alice, the daughter of Sir John Milford, of Mitford Castle in Northumberland. Next came, Sir Matthew Whitfield, of Whitfield Hall, High Sheriff of Northumberland who married Margaret, the daughter of Sir John de Lancaster, of Howgill and Rydall, a relative of William de Lancaster I. Their son, William Whitfield, married to the sole heiress of Randle Holme of Alston Moor in Cumberland, in turn had son, William Whitfield. His son, John Whitfield, living 1480 had married Ann, the only daughter of Sir William Hilton, of Hylton Castle. Son Richard Whitfield, and grandson, Ralph Whitfield, followed as owners of Whitfield Hall.

Miles Whitfield, of Newtonbury in Alston Moor, Cumberland, married Matilda. His brother, John Whitfield, of Whitfield Hall was the ancestor of Matthew Whitfield who sold Whitfield Hall and estate to William Ord of Fenham sometime after 1730. Miles' son, Robert Whitfield, left Cumberland and settled at Wadhurst in Sussex, where he became an ironmaster. By his second marriage to Agnes Giles he was father of Robert Whitfield (born between 1517-1518), who married Ann, daughter of George and Rose Roberts, and then Agnes Atwood. This Robert was an ironmaster at Worth in Sussex, where he acquired the estate of Rowfant and built the mansion Rowfant House.

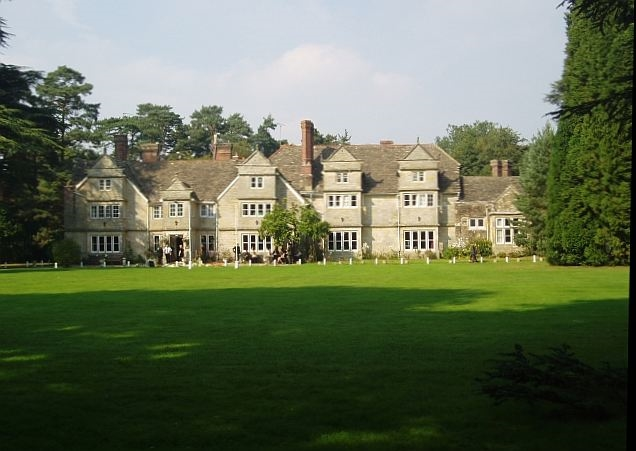
Rowfant House

His son Thomas Whitfield, who was born about mid 1545, studied at Oxford University and at the Inner Temple, qualifying as an advocate. He married Mildred Manning. Their younger son Henry Whitfield, born about 1591, was a founder of Guilford, Connecticut in the American colonies where he built the Henry Whitfield House, the oldest stone house in New England and Connecticut.

Miles' grandson John Whitfield, born about 1520, settled at Tenterden in Kent and his descendants continued the Whitfield line, which includes the eminent lawyer Sir Ralph Whitfield (1588-1645) and his son Sir Herbert Whitfield (1617-1677).

== Bibliography ==
- Nicholson and Burn's History of Westmorland and Cumberland Vol 1
- Wallis's History of Northumberland
- Dugdale's Baronage, William Dugdale
- Fodera Litt and Acto Publicas Vol 1
- Survey of London, John Stow
