= Herbert Whitfield =

Herbert Whitfield may refer to:

- Herbert Whitfeld (1858–1909), English amateur sportsman who played football and cricket
- Sir Herbert Whitfield (1617–1677), English lawyer and landowner
