= Offham Marshes =

Protected area in East Sussex, England

Coordinates: 50.888°N 0.005°W

- Site of Special Scientific Interest
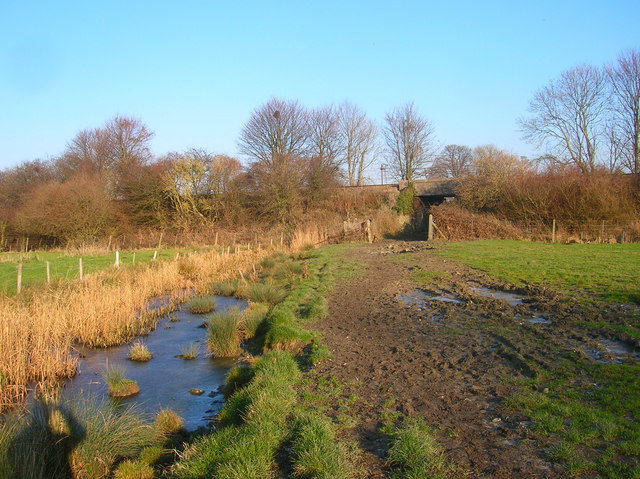
- Location of Offham Marshes.
- Area of search: East Sussex
- Grid reference: TQ 404 117
- Interest: Biological
- Area: 39.1 hectares (97 acres)
- Notification date: 1989
- Location map: Magic Map

Offham Marshes, also known as The Pells and Offham Marsh, is a 39.1-hectare (97-acre) biological Site of Special Scientific Interest on the northern outskirts of Lewes in East Sussex in parish of Hamsey. It includes the Pellbrook Cut, an area to the north of it called The Pells and the marshland to the south of the Cut and east of the railway track.

== History ==
It was designated SSSI status in 1989 because of its huge Common Toad population. The toads migrated in huge numbers every spring from the overhanging woods. Eels could also be seen there, even occasionally moving on land. Unfortunately these grand passages are less easy to witness now as toad and eel populations struggle to maintain numbers.

In 1997 the marshes were threatened when a farmer, with permission from English Nature, began to plough up the marshes for Flax. Activists, who cared enough for the wildlife that would be destroyed by such actions, occupied the site. They won the struggle to save both the marshes and Offham Down's archaic flowery turf, which the farmer also threatened to plough.

== The Pellbrook Cut and other brooks ==
The clear chalky spring water of the Pellbrook Cut and the other alluvial brooks still have large breeding populations of amphibian species such as common toads, smooth newts, palmate newts, marsh frogs and common frogs. They support many beetles, including Britain's largest species, the rare great silver diving beetle, and whirligig beetles, many water snails, water spiders and water crickets. The marshes can host fan-leaved water-crowfoot, arrowhead, frogbit and water dropworts, English Nature manages the ditches and clears them carefully. If the channel clearances are too heavy, important and rare species can be lost with the species they support. Water violet is still present (as of 2021) on the west side of the Cut.

== The Pells ==
The Pells has an old willow holt with wild hop and black currant. The marsh to its east is an equal mix of sedge fen, horsetail fen and meadow-sweet fen. The fens support bur-reed, with purple loosestrife and yellow flag iris. The pools support dragonflies, including the hairy dragonfly, Damselflies, amphibious bistort, reed and other warblers.

== East side ==
The east side of the railway line up to the Drove is tilled Grey Chalk and Gault ground, which bring many fossils and iron pyrites nodules.
