= Thomas Sorby =

English footballer (1856–1930)

Personal information
- Full name: Thomas Heathcote Sorby
- Date of birth: 16 February 1856
- Place of birth: Sheffield, England
- Date of death: 13 December 1930 (aged 74)
- Place of death: Scarborough, England
- Position: Outside forward

Senior career*
Years	Team	Apps	(Gls)
	Thursday Wanderers	0	(0)
–	Sheffield	0	(0)

International career
1879	England	1	(1)
- * Club domestic league appearances and goals

Thomas Heathcote Sorby (16 February 1856 – 13 December 1930) was an English amateur footballer who made one appearance for England.

== Football career ==
Sorby was born in Sheffield, the fourth of ten children of Thomas Austin Sorby (1823–1885) and Dorothy Heathcote (1826–1904). His father was a partner in Robert Sorby and Sons, the family business, described as "Edge Tool Manufacturers". He was educated at Cheltenham College and played for various Sheffield football clubs including the Thursday Wanderers and Sheffield, claimed to be the oldest football club in the world. He also represented the Sheffield FA.

His solitary England appearance came when he was one of five new players selected for the match against Wales at the Kennington Oval on 18 January 1879. The match was played in a blizzard and both captains agreed to play halves of only 30 minutes each. This was the first match between the two countries — Wales had previously only played three international matches, all against Scotland, including a 9–0 defeat in March 1878. England's two goals came from Sorby and fellow débutante, Herbert Whitfeld, with William Davies scoring for Wales. According to the football historian, Philip Gibbons, "England were surprised by the level of skill shown by the Welsh team".

== Family ==
Sorby married Annie Maud Laycock (1861–1933) on 7 August 1889 in Sheffield. They had one child, Violet Maude, who was born on 25 June 1891. She remained single and died childless before March 1979.

His brother, Albert Ernest Sorby (1859–1934) was a clergyman who became rector at Darfield, South Yorkshire, and a member of the Upton Park Football Club.

== Career outside football ==
Sorby was a member of Robert Sorby and Sons, the family firm of edge tool manufacturers based in Sheffield. On his father's death in 1885, Sorby and his brother, Robert Arthur Sorby, took control of the company although Robert died in 1896. Sorby left the family business in 1906 and was the last member of the family to be actively involved with the business. Since that time the firm has changed hands several times but still retains the "Robert Sorby" name and is noted as a maker of high end chisels and woodworking tools.

Sorby settled in Scarborough where he died on 13 December 1930.
