= Whitefield Academy =

Whitefield Academy may refer to:

== United States ==
- Whitefield Academy (Georgia), Mableton, Georgia
- Whitefield Academy (Kentucky), Louisville, Kentucky
- Whitefield Academy (Missouri), Kansas City, Missouri

== Canada ==
- Whitefield Christian Academy (Ontario), Toronto, Ontario
