= Ralph Whitfield =

English lawyer, judge and landowner

Sir Ralph Whitfield KS MP

Member of Parliament for Clitheroe
- In office 1624–1625

Personal details
- Born: 1588 Tenterden, Kent, England
- Died: 1645 (aged 56–57) City of London, England
- Spouse: Dorothy Spelman
- Education: Gray's Inn
- Profession: Lawyer, legislator, judge, landowner

Sir Ralph Whitfield (1588–1645) was an English lawyer, judge and landowner, who sat as a Member of Parliament and held several public offices.

== Early life ==
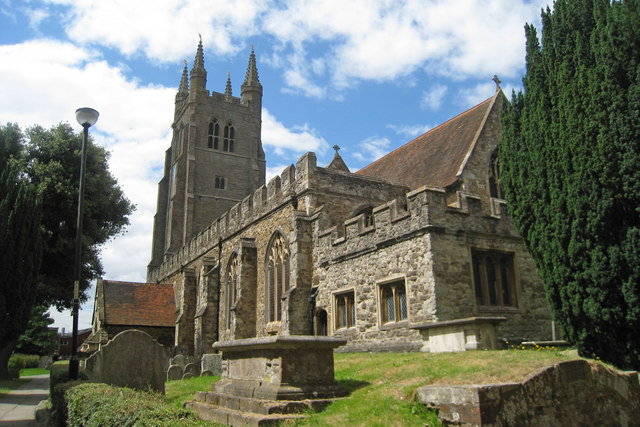
St Mildred's, Tenterden

Whitfield was baptised on 3 March 1588 at the church of St Mildred in Tenterden, Kent. He was the eldest surviving son of Herbert Whitfield (1560–1622), a landowner, and his wife Martha Sheppard (d.1613), second daughter of Robert Sheppard of Peasmarsh in Sussex and his wife Agnes Birchet from Rye. His great-grandfather Robert Whitfield (c.1453–1541), from Alston Moor in Cumberland, had settled at Wadhurst in Sussex and a great-uncle had built the historic house of Rowfant at Worth.

== Career ==
Trained in law at Gray's Inn, where he was admitted on 3 February 1608, by 1621 Whitfield was acting as counsel for the Cinque Ports and in 1622 inherited his father's estate. As a landowner he was appointed to the Commission of Sewers (the drainage authority) for Kent and for Sussex. He also served on county commissions against piracy and recusancy. By 1625 he was a Justice of the Peace for Kent and for Sussex.

In 1624 he was elected Member of Parliament for Clitheroe in Lancashire and had an active term, sitting on several committees and speaking on several issues, until he was replaced in 1625. In November 1632 he was appointed a Serjeant-at-law and by 1633 was permanent counsel to the Cinque Ports, being made a King's Serjeant in 1635. On 4 October 1635 he was knighted at Hampton Court Palace and appointed a judge of oyer and terminer and of gaol delivery for London and Middlesex.

In addition to his judicial work in England, he was involved in colonial ventures overseas. In 1627 he was a founder member of the Guiana Company, set up by royal patent to trade with the Amazon basin and north coast of South America, while in 1638 he headed a royal commission on the plantation of The Honourable The Irish Society in County Londonderry on the north coast of Ireland.

When the English Civil War broke out, he chose the Parliament side and was retained as a legal adviser to the House of Lords.

Investing the considerable profits of his career in real estate, he acquired the manor of Burmarsh in Kent and lands at Wivenhoe in Essex as well as a house in the Barbican, London. In 1640 he also held the patronage of the parish of Rodmersham in Kent.

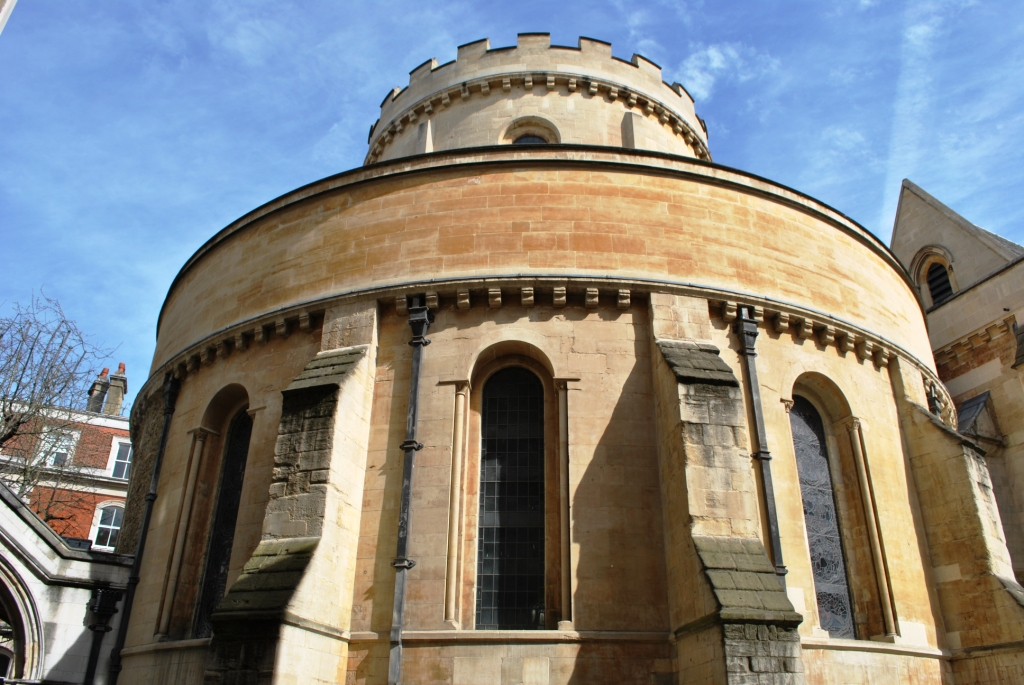
Temple Church, London

Buried on 15 September 1645 in the Temple Church, his will of 12 September 1645 lamented the death of his brother-in-law Sir John Spelman and the depredations to his own estate but anticipated that his surviving brother-in-law, Robert Raworth, would assist his wife and eldest son. To his widow he left over 1,500 pounds (more than 225,000 pounds in 2014 value), plus extensive property in London and Kent to be divided with their eldest son. To his only daughter he left 2,500 pounds (over 375,000 pounds at 2014 prices) and his two youngest sons were each to receive 1,000 pounds (worth at least 150,000 pounds in 2014), together with annuities to provide for their education.

== Personal life ==
By 1618 Whitfield had married Dorothy Spelman, daughter of the antiquary Sir Henry Spelman, of Congham in Norfolk, and his wife Eleanor, daughter of John Lestrange (d.1582), of Sedgeford in Norfolk. Her brothers were the historian and politician Sir John Spelman (1594–1643) and the judge Clement Spelman (1598–1679). Catherine Spelman, one of her sisters, married Robert Raworth, a lawyer closely associated with the Whitfield family.

Five of their children reached adulthood :

Sir Herbert Whitfield (1618–1677) married Margaret Peirson and had seven children.
Henry Whitfield (1619–1688), MP for Trim in the Irish House of Commons who also had investments in Barbados. He married Hester Temple and they had six children.
Ralph Whitfield (c.1620–c.1645) who, after education at Cambridge and Gray's Inn, went to Jamaica where he died.
Dorothy Whitfield (c.1622–), who married John Fotherley, son of Sir Thomas Fotherley who had interests in Jamaica.
Roger Whitfield, who followed his father to Gray’s Inn and the bar but died young.
