= George Whitfeld =

English cricketer

Personal information
- Full name: George Sulivan Whitfeld
- Born: 20 March 1878; Hamsey, Sussex, England
- Died: 29 July 1945 (aged 67); Earls Court, London, England
- Batting: Unknown
- Bowling: Unknown
- Relatives: Francis Whitfeld (father); Herbert Whitfeld (uncle)

Domestic team information
- Years: Team
- 1908: Sussex

Career statistics
Competition	First-class
Matches	3
Runs scored	191
Batting average	63.66
100s/50s	–/1
Top score	71*
Balls bowled	–
Wickets	–
Bowling average	–
5 wickets in innings	–
10 wickets in match	–
Best bowling	–
Catches/stumpings	–/–
- Source: Cricinfo, 12 March 2012

George Sulivan Whitfeld (20 March 1878 – 29 July 1945) was an English cricketer. Whitfeld's batting and bowling styles are unknown. He was born at Hamsey, Sussex.

Whitfeld made his first-class debut for Sussex against Nottinghamshire in the 1908 County Championship. He made two further first-class appearances in that season, against Kent and Surrey. In his three first-class appearances, he scored 191 runs at an average of 63.66, with a high score of 71 not out. This score was his only half century and came against Surrey.

He died at Earls Court, London, on 29 July 1945. His father, Francis, played first-class cricket. His uncle, Herbert, also played first-class cricket for Sussex, as well as being a two-time FA Cup winner with the Old Etonians.
