= Charles Whitfield =

Charles Whitfield may refer to:

- Charles L. Whitfield, American physician and author on childhood trauma
- Charles Malik Whitfield (born 1971), American actor
- Charles Richard Whitfield (1927–2018), Northern Irish obstetrician and gynaecologist
- Charles Whitfield, American music producer at Hidden Beach Recordings
