= Henry Whitfield (lawyer) =

English lawyer

Henry Whitfield (1619–1688) was an English lawyer who moved to Ireland, where he was elected a member of the Irish House of Commons, and apparently had financial interests in Barbados.

== Life ==
Baptised on 17 June 1619 at the church of St Giles Cripplegate in London and recorded as age 16 in the 1634 Visitation of London, he was the second son of Sir Ralph Whitfield, a landowner, MP and prominent lawyer in London, and his wife Dorothy, daughter of the antiquary Sir Henry Spelman. His elder brother was the lawyer and landowner Sir Herbert Whitfield. In 1632 he was admitted at Gray's Inn, his father's Inn of Court, to study law and in 1635 he was admitted to Corpus Christi College, Cambridge for a university education. In 1646 at the church of St Bartholomew-the-Less in London he married Hester, daughter of William Temple. At some point he moved to Ireland, and by 1685 was MP for Trim. Having made his will on 26 September 1688, which was later registered in Barbados where he presumably had financial interests, he died in Dublin on 26 October 1688. His wife outlived him, dying in 1696.

== Family ==
Together, he and Hester had six known children:

- Temple (died 1730) married Elizabeth Osborn but had no children. His father's sister Dorothy, widow of John Fotherley whose father Sir Thomas Fotherley died in the 1692 Jamaica earthquake, left him the manor of Rickmansworth and the estate there of Bury Park.
- Ralph (died 1694) married his first cousin Arabella, daughter of his uncle Sir Herbert Whitfield, and had two known children: Ralph, who in 1710 married Felicia Johnson, and Maria.
- Henry settled at Bishops Stortford in Hertfordshire, where in 1689 he married Abigail Gape from St Albans. Their son Henry inherited the manor of Rickmansworth and estate of Bury Park from his childless uncle Temple.
- Jane (died 1712) first married Joseph Saunders and had issue including Richard: their granddaughter Jane Saunders became the wife of the politician Arthur Gore, 1st Earl of Arran. After his death, she married secondly in 1684 the Irish judge Sir Robert Doyne and had further issue, including Philip.
- Dorothy (died 1705) was the second wife of the politician Sir Richard Bulkeley, 1st Baronet and after his death in 1685 became the third wife of the judge William Worth.
- Hester in 1690 married as his first wife the soldier Joseph Sabine but, after having three sons who all died young, died at the age of 24. According to legend, her ghost then appeared to her husband, who at the time was overseas recovering from wounds.
