= Francis Whitfeld =

English cricketer

Personal information
- Full name: Francis Barry Whitfeld
- Born: 23 May 1852; Hamsey, Sussex, England
- Died: 8 January 1924 (aged 71); Lewes, Sussex, England
- Batting: Unknown
- Bowling: Unknown
- Relatives: George Whitfeld (son); Herbert Whitfeld (brother)

Domestic team information
- Years: Team
- 1878: Sussex

Career statistics
Competition	First-class
Matches	2
Runs scored	7
Batting average	1.75
100s/50s	–/–
Top score	5
Balls bowled	–
Wickets	–
Bowling average	–
5 wickets in innings	–
10 wickets in match	–
Best bowling	–
Catches/stumpings	3/–
- Source: Cricinfo, 12 March 2012

Francis Barry Whitfeld (23 May 1852 – 8 January 1924) was an English cricketer. Whitfeld's batting and bowling styles are unknown. He was born at Hamsey, Sussex.

Whitfeld made a single first-class appearance for Sussex against the touring Australians at the County Ground, Hove, in 1878. In this match, Whitfeld was dismissed for a single run in Sussex's first-innings by Frederick Spofforth, while in their second-innings he was dismissed for a duck by the same bowler. He later made a second first-class appearance, this time for GN Wyatt's XI against the Australians at the United Services Recreation Ground, Portsmouth in 1886. Whitfeld scored 5 runs in the team's first-innings, before once again falling to the bowling of Spofforth, while in their second-innings he made a single run, before being dismissed by Eugene Palmer.

He died at Lewes, Sussex, on 8 January 1924. His son, George, played first-class cricket for Sussex. His brother, Herbert, also played first-class cricket for the county, as well as being a two-time FA Cup winner with the Old Etonians.
