= Herbert Whitfeld =

English footballer and cricketer

Personal information
- Date of birth: 15 November 1858
- Place of birth: Hamsey, East Sussex, England
- Date of death: 6 May 1909 (aged 50)
- Place of death: Chailey, East Sussex, England
- Position: Outside forward

Youth career
- Cambridge University

Senior career*
Years	Team	Apps	(Gls)
- Old Etonians

International career
1879	England	1	(1)
- * Club domestic league appearances and goals

Herbert Whitfeld
Cricket information
- Batting: Right-handed
- Bowling: Round arm Left-arm medium pace

Domestic team information
- Years: Team
- 1878–1881: Cambridge University
- 1878–1885: Sussex
- 1881–1887: Marylebone Cricket Club
- 1880–1889: I Zingari
- First-class debut: 20 May 1878 Cambridge University v Yorkshire
- Last First-class: 30 August 1889 I Zingari v Gentlemen of England

Career statistics
Competition	First-class
Matches	75
Runs scored	2400
Batting average	20.16
100s/50s	1/13
Top score	116
Balls bowled	536
Wickets	6
Bowling average	47.00
5 wickets in innings	0
10 wickets in match	0
Best bowling	2/35
Catches/stumpings	65/–
- Source: CricketArchive, 3 February 2011

Herbert Whitfeld (15 November 1858 – 6 May 1909) was an English amateur sportsman who played association football and county cricket.

In football, he helped Old Etonians win the 1879 FA Cup Final and was on the losing side in 1881 as well as making one appearance for England in 1879. In cricket, he played for Sussex County Cricket Club whom he captained in 1883 and 1884. He was later a director of Barclays Bank.

== Early career and education ==
Whitfeld was born in Hamsey, near Lewes in East Sussex and was educated at Eton where he developed an interest in all forms of sport and played for the college football team in 1877. He was also a member of the college cricket eleven from 1875 to 1877, being captain in his last year.

He went up to Trinity College, Cambridge in 1877 and earned blues in cricket in every year between 1878 and 1881 and in football in 1879, 1880 and 1881. He also represented the university at athletics, as a medium distance runner, and in real tennis where he was partner to Ivo Bligh, who was to become the captain of the England cricket team.

== Football career ==
On leaving university, Whitfeld joined the Old Etonians and in 1879 he helped the Old Boys reach the final of the FA Cup for the third time in five years. Whitfeld played as an outside-forward and scored in each of the three matches against Darwen in the fourth round and against Nottingham Forest in the semi-final.

In the final, played at the Kennington Oval on 29 March 1879, the Old Etonians met Clapham Rovers, for whom this was the first appearance in the final. Although Clapham dominated the early stages of the final, with Norman Bailey having two attempts on target, Whitfeld continued to run at the Clapham defenders with little assistance from his colleagues. After a goalless first-half, the only goal of the game came after 59 minutes, when Charles Clerke scored from close range following a run from Harry Goodhart. The old Etonians thus claimed the cup for the first time in what was considered to be "the poorest FA Cup Final to date" with Whitfeld being "the most skilful player on view".

Whitfeld's solitary England appearance came when he was one of five new players selected for the match against Wales at the Kennington Oval on 18 January 1879. The match was played in a blizzard and both captains agreed to play halves of only 30 minutes each. This was the first match between the two countries – Wales had previously only played three international matches, all against Scotland, including a 9–0 defeat in March 1878. England's two goals came from Whitfeld and fellow débutante, Thomas Sorby, with William Davies scoring for Wales. According to the football historian, Philip Gibbons, "England were surprised by the level of skill shown by the Welsh team".

In the following year, Clapham Rovers gained their revenge, defeating the Old Etonians in the Fifth Round, but the Old Boys reached the final again in 1881, with Whitfeld scoring twice in the 10–0 victory over Brentwood in the First Round. The final was played at the Kennington Oval against the Old Carthusians on 9 April 1881; this was the Old Carthusians first appearance in the final and the Old Etonians, on their fourth appearance, were expected to win comfortably. In the event, the Old Carthusians won convincingly, with goals from Edward Wynyard, Edward Parry, and Alexander Tod.

Whitfeld was also a member of the Wanderers, and played in their final match on 18 December 1883.

== Cricket career ==
While he was at Trinity College, Cambridge, Whitfeld represented the university from 1878 to 1881. His first match came against Yorkshire in May 1878 when he scored a duck; despite this, the university won the match by 10 wickets. In June, his unbroken 81 helped the university to a resounding victory over Surrey by an innings and 112 runs. In his first varsity match, he scored a total of 27 runs to help Cambridge defeat Oxford by 238 runs.

He made his first appearance for Sussex against Kent in July 1878, scoring only two runs as Sussex were defeated by an innings and 36 runs.

His only first-class century came in May 1880 when he scored 116, partnering Ivo Bligh (90) to 150 for the first wicket and Richard Jones (124) to a stand of 121 for the second wicket against the Gentlemen of England. The university scored a total of 593 in a drawn match.

His first match as captain of Sussex came when he took over from Frederick Greenfield for the county's final match of 1882 against Nottinghamshire; Nottinghamshire won the match by 10 wickets. Whitfield retained the captaincy for the next two years with his final match as captain coming in August 1884, when his 41* was not sufficient to prevent Surrey winning by four wickets.

His first-class cricket career was now coming to an end and he made only one further appearance for the county, in August 1885.

In all, he made 23 appearances for Cambridge University and 39 for Sussex in a career that spanned twelve seasons. He also played for I Zingari and Marylebone Cricket Club as well as other representative sides. His last first-class match was for I Zingari in 1889.

== Later career ==
After leaving university, Whitfeld joined Barclays Bank and became a local director based in Lewes, East Sussex. He died at nearby Chailey on 6 May 1909 aged 50.

== Family ==
His brother, Francis played two first-class matches: one for Sussex in 1878 and another for GN Wyatt's XI in 1886. and his nephew, George played three matches in 1908.

== Honours ==
Old Etonians

- FA Cup winners: 1879
- FA Cup finalists: 1881
