= Governor Whitfield =

Governor Whitfield may refer to:

- Henry L. Whitfield (1868–1927), 41st Governor of Mississippi
- James Whitfield (Mississippi politician) (1791–1875), 18th Governor of Mississippi
