= Charles L. Whitfield =

American physician

Charles L. Whitfield is an American medical doctor in private practice specializing in assisting survivors of childhood trauma with their recovery, and with addictions including alcoholism and related disorders. He is certified by the American Society of Addiction Medicine, a founding member of the National Association for the Children of Alcoholics, and a member of the American Professional Society on the Abuse of Children.

Whitfield taught at Rutgers University and is a best-selling author known for his books on the topics of general childhood trauma, childhood sexual abuse, and addiction recovery, including Healing the Child Within and Memory and Abuse: Remembering and Healing the Effects of Trauma.

Whitfield is recognized for his sixty published articles and fifteen published books. Some of his works are: Healing the Child Within (1987), Memory and Abuse (1995), and The Truth About Mental Illness (2004).

== Work on childhood trauma ==
Whitfield was a part of the adverse childhood experiences (ACE) study. Through this study, Whitfield and colleagues have been able to conclude that hallucinations do have an association with childhood trauma. Before this ACE study, medical professionals had already known that hallucinations can be tied to many mental illnesses and their severities such as bipolar disorder, schizophrenia, and dissociative-personality disorder. It was because of this study that Whitfield and his colleagues were able to take a step back and see what type of relationship with trauma one had as a child. These traumas included abuse (sexual, physical, and/or emotional), parental separation or divorce, witnessing and/or experiencing domestic violence, living with people who abuse substances, who have been or are currently incarcerated, and who are mentally ill as a child. This helped show that having violent childhood experiences led to an increased risk of intimate partner violence. These criteria were then used to score the ACEs, which range from 0 to 8, to see where one could be a potential hallucinator.

This study was a collaboration between the Center for Disease Control and Prevention (CDC) and Kaiser Permanente's Health Appraisal Center (HAC) in San Diego. The purpose of this study was to observe and assess the impact of one's adulthood when experiencing one or multiple traumatic childhood experiences and to determine if this impacts health behaviors and outcomes and health care utilization. The study was then approved by Kaiser Permanente's institutional review board, along with Emory University, the National Institutes of Health, and the Office of Protection from Research Risks. The pool of people selected for this study was chosen from the HAC. Those that were chosen were then evaluated at the HAC and had to complete a questionnaire, which included detailed health history, health-related behaviors, psychosocial evaluations, and medical reviews. Two weeks after taking the questionnaire at HAC, the people involved in their study were mailed home an ACE study questionnaire. The ACE study questionnaire was used to ask those involved about their adverse childhood experiences in detail, family and household dysfunction, and their health-related behaviors from their adolescence to their adult life.

This study concluded 54% of women and 46% of men. The mean age of the participants was 57 years old. 75% of the participants were White, 39% of the participants were college graduates, 36% of participants had some college education but had not completed schooling, 18% of participants graduated high school, and 7% of participants had not graduated high school. The adverse childhood experiences that were being asked about were described as emotional abuse, physical abuse, sexual abuse, a battered mother, household substance abuse, mental illness in household, parental separation or divorce, and an incarcerated household member. When these participants were answering these questions, they had to answer them by the conflict tactics scale (CTS). The response categories concluded "never", "once or twice", "sometimes", "often", and "very often". Emotional, physical, and sexual abuse were defined by CTS questions along with the questions about having a battered mother. The rest were answered by yes or no. In the result of this ACE study, women had the higher adverse childhood experiences scores than men in every category except physical abuse. Yet, when it came to being asked if the participants had any issues with substance abuse, men had a higher rate of using substance abuse. Same thing with those who have had adverse childhood experiences and have had a history of hallucinations. Men have had a higher rate than women despite only having a higher percentage with only one ACE category.

== Stages of recovery ==
Whitfield took his time when healing his patients. During the years of 1973 through 1985, Whitfield studied his patients and their lives after they went through the recovery and healing programs provided to them. He noticed how effective it was for patients to get help early on as well as how many times people relapsed after going however so long without using. According to Whitfield, "Most of their relapses usually turned out to be due to a low participation in a recovery program, or to their unhealed painful effects of trauma—or both." Quitting from drugs or alcohol was only the first stages of healing for many patients. Whitfield figured out that allowing patients to express their traumas and childhoods lead to better healing as it allowed them let go of the toxicity that makes them want to use drugs or alcohol. There are three stages of recovery according to Whitfield, the first is for basic illness and lasts some month to 3+ years. The next stage focuses on trauma, it lasts about 3-5+ years. The last stage focuses on spirituality, and can go on for however long. Whitfield shared his approach with others who handled similar situations and they also noticed patients getting better. Along with using each of these stages on patients, Whitfield also allowed patients to be part of their own treatment plan. Instead of having somebody write out a plan that the patient may or may not follow, Whitfield had patients write out their own recovery plan through a sort of template provided by him. Doing so allows the patient to feel more involved and gives them motivation to stick with it. Spirituality is a key factor in recovery and is used throughout all stages. Many patients had a hard time finding that spirituality but eventually would, and the reason for them finding it was that the patient finally knew their real self.

== Contributions to the medical field ==
Due to this ACE study, Whitfield had made a big contribution to the medical field. For example, because of this ACE study, it has been easier for medical professionals to ask the right questions and/or look for the signs of people who have experienced childhood traumatic stressors and have had histories of hallucinations. This study has helped doctors and other medical professionals become better at treating each patient and personalizing the treatments as well as making sure it is the most effective to each patient. By personalizing medical treatments for each individual, it helps each individual not only get better mentally, but physically as well.

== Work on childhood sexual abuse ==
Research stating the particular study concludes Whitfield’s work on childhood abuse and depressive disorders have been frequently assessed categorically, thus not permitting discernment of cumulative impacts on multiple types of abuse. As previous research study has been done on adverse childhood experiences (ACEs) are interrelated, study examined the association between the number of such experiences as a particular (ACE) score and the risk of depressive disorders. Notably, women related childhood abuse recorded to be 2.7 and 3.1 times embraces a lifetime history of depressive disorders or recent depressive disorders. Adverse childhood experiences have a strong, relationship to risk of lifetime and current depressive disorders which to an extent implements child's adulthood which creates a negative impact on their growing age. This recent study mainly states that the most increasing number of childhood abuse cases are most likely to be found with divorced parents or parents consuming heavy drugs or mainly 'heads of the household' are drug addicts.

Whitfield died on December 9, 2021.

== Bibliography ==
- Dragon Energy: Myth and Reality | New Paradigms (August 14, 2019)
- Healing the Child Within: Discovery and Recovery for Adult Children of Dysfunctional Families
- A Gift to Myself: A Personal Guide to Healing My Child Within
- Co-Dependence: Healing the Human Condition
- Boundaries and Relationships: Knowing, Protecting, and Enjoying the Self
- Memory and Abuse: Remembering and Healing the Effects of Trauma
- Whitfield, Charles L. (2001). "The "False Memory" Defense: Using Disinformation and Junk Science in and Out of Court". Journal of Child Sexual Abuse. 9 (3–4): 53–78. doi:10.1300/J070v09n03_04. PMID 17521991. S2CID 24310658.
- Misinformation concerning child sexual abuse and adult survivors. Whitfield, C.L., Silberg, J., & Fink, P.J. (Eds.) (2002). New York: Haworth Press.
- The Truth about Depression: Choices for Healing. Health Communications, Deerfield Beach, FL, 2003 (800-851-9100)(translated into Portuguese)
- The Truth about Mental Illness: Choices for Healing. Health Communications, Deerfield Beach, FL, 2004
- My Recovery: A Personal Plan for Healing. Health Communications, Deerfield Beach, FL, 2003
- The Power of Humility: Choosing Peace over Conflict in Relationships. Whitfield CL, Whitfield BH, Prevatt J, & Park R Health Communications, Deerfield Beach, FL, 2006
- Not Crazy: You May Not be Mentally Ill. Muse House Press, Atlanta 2012
- Whitfield, Charles L. (2010). "Psychiatric drugs as agents of trauma". International Journal of Risk & Safety in Medicine. 22 (4): 195–207. doi:10.3233/JRS-2010-0508.
- Wisdom to Know the Difference: Core Issues in Relationships, Recovery and Living. Muse House Press, Atlanta, Ga 2012
- Timeless Troubadours: The Moody Blues Music and Message. Foreword by MB’s co-founder, keyboardist, composer and vocalist Mike Pinder. Muse House Press, Atlanta, Georgia. 2013 with Whitfield BH
- Choosing God: A Bird's Eye View of A Course in Miracles. Muse House Press, Atlanta 2010
- Teachers of God: Further Reflections on A Course in Miracles. Muse House Press, Atlanta 2010
- Chapman, Daniel P.; Whitfield, Charles L.; Felitti, Vincent J.; Dube, Shanta R.; Edwards, Valerie J.; Anda, Robert F. (October 2004). "Adverse childhood experiences and the risk of depressive disorders in adulthood". Journal of Affective Disorders. 82 (2): 217–225. doi:10.1016/j.jad.2003.12.013.

== See also ==
- Personal boundaries
- Repressed memory
- False memory syndrome
