= General Whitfield =

General Whitfield may refer to:

- Henry Wase Whitfield (1814–1877), British Army lieutenant general
- John Wilkins Whitfield (1818–1879), Confederate States Army brigadier general
- John Yeldham Whitfield (1899–1971), British Army major general
