= Justice Whitfield =

Justice Whitfield may refer to:

- Albert H. Whitfield (1849–1918), associate justice of the Supreme Court of Mississippi
- James B. Whitfield (1860–1948), chief justice of the Supreme Court of Florida
