= John Whitfield =

John Whitfield may refer to:

- John Whitfield (conductor) (1957–2019), British musician and conductor
- John Whitfield (poet), Oxford Professor of Poetry
- John Whitfield (politician) (born 1941), Conservative English Member of Parliament elected in 1983 for Dewsbury
- D.C. Young Fly, born John Whitfield, American entertainer
- John Clarke Whitfield (1770–1836), English organist and composer
- John Wilkins Whitfield (1818–1879), U.S. House Delegate from Kansas Territory
- John Yeldham Whitfield (1899–1971), British Army officer

== See also ==
- Jack Whitfield (1892–1927), Welsh rugby union player
