= Whitefield (surname) =

Whitefield is the surname of:

- Aaron Whitefield (born 1996), Australian baseball player
- David Whitefield (1936–2014), South African cricketer
- Edwin Whitefield (1816–1892), English-born American landscape painter and lithographer
- George Whitefield (1714–1770), English Anglican cleric and evangelist, one of the founders of Methodism and the evangelical movement
- Henry Whitefield, Archdeacon of Barnstaple from 1371 to 1384
- Karen Whitefield (born 1970), Scottish politician
- Patrick Whitefield (1949–2015), British permaculture teacher, designer and author
- Ruth Althén (1890–1985), Swedish operatic soprano, née Whitefield
- Thomas Whitefield (fl. 1378–1401), English politician, mayor of Hereford and Member of Parliament
- William Whitefield (1850–1926), British trade unionist
