= Whitfield, Northumberland =

Village in Northumberland, England

Coordinates: 54.920°N 2.349°W

Whitfield
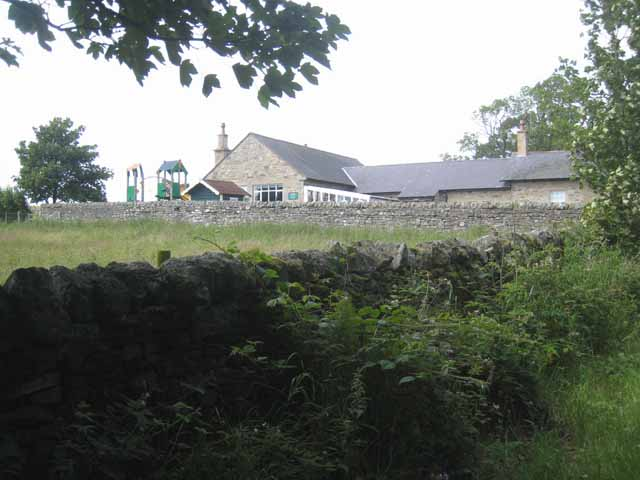

- Location within Northumberland
- OS grid reference: NY775585
- Civil parish: Plenmeller with Whitfield
- Unitary authority: Northumberland
- Ceremonial county: Northumberland
- Region: North East
- Country: England
- Sovereign state: United Kingdom
- Post town: HEXHAM
- Postcode district: NE47
- Dialling code: 01434
- Police: Northumbria
- Fire: Northumberland
- Ambulance: North East
- UK Parliament: Hexham

Whitfield is a village and former civil parish, now in the parish of Plenmeller with Whitfield, in the county of Northumberland, England about 10 miles (16 km) southwest of Hexham. It has a farming community and is set against a beautiful scenic background; sometimes it has been called Little Switzerland. In 1951 the parish had a population of 233.

The village lies on the River West Allen which joins with the River East Allen less than a mile away to form the River Allen. The village is serviced with a village shop, pub, school and two churches.

== Governance ==
On 1 April 1955 the parish was abolished to form "Plenmeller with Whitfield".

== Landmarks ==
Whitfield Hall is the home of the Blackett-Ord family. The Manor of Whitfield was granted, in the 12th century, by William the Lion, King of Scotland, to the Whitfield family, who retained it until 1750 when it was sold to William Ord of Fenham. When a later William Ord died in 1855, the estate fell to his son's widow and then to her heir, her niece, who married Rev John Blackett, a son of Christopher Blackett of Wylam. As a condition of the marriage and inheritance, he changed his name to Blackett-Ord.

== Religious sites ==
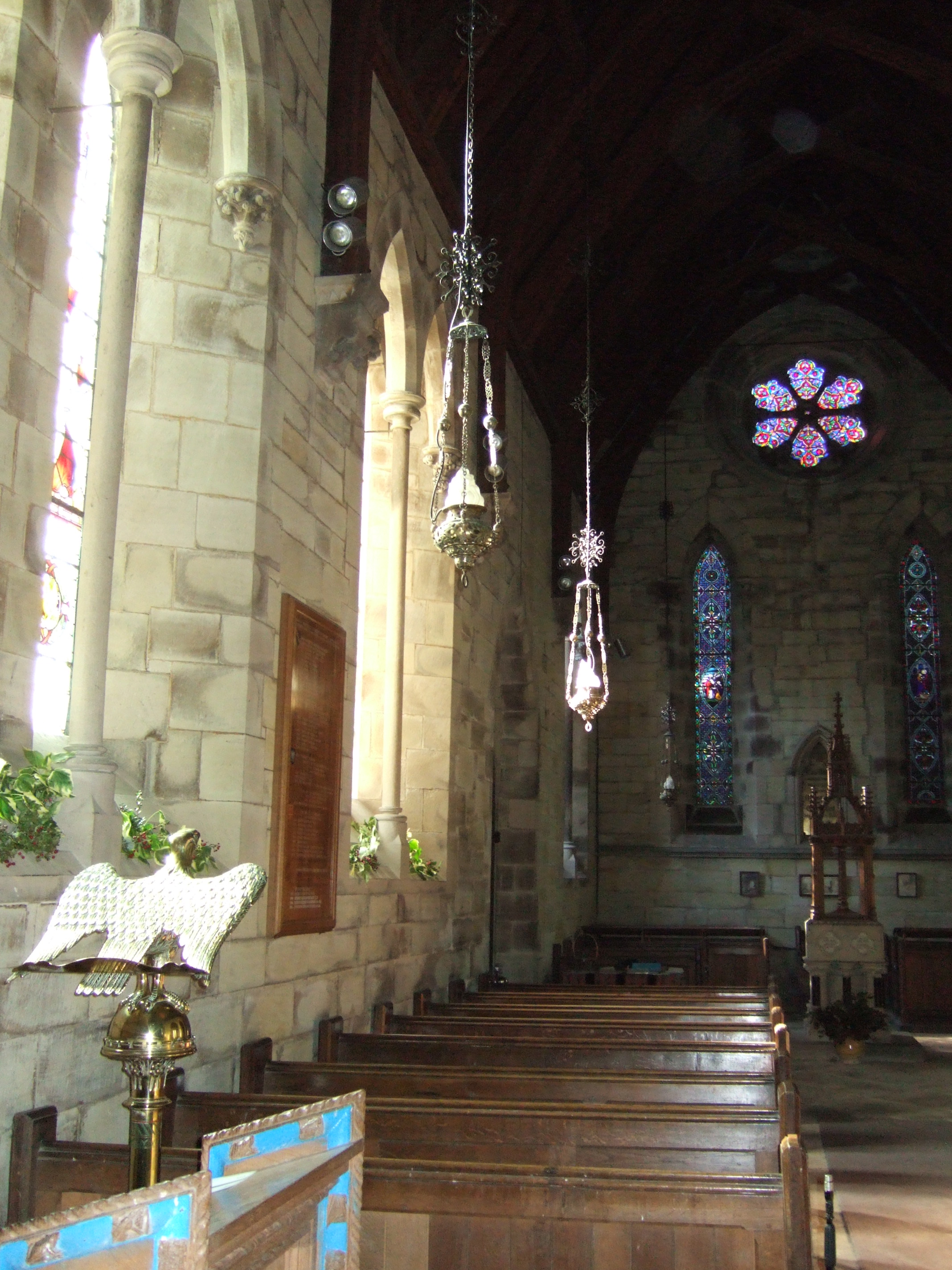
interior of Whitfield's C of E church

St John's Church is the site of an ancient church that was rebuilt by William Ord in 1785. Trinity Church (more usually known as Holy Trinity) was dedicated in 1860 and was the gift of the Rev'd and Mrs. J. A. Blackett-Ord in memory of William Ord Esq. from whom Mrs. Blackett-Ord had inherited the whole estate. It replaced St. John's church as the parish church. Many of the stones from St. John's were used in the building of Holy Trinity. The registers start in 1612 and the list of Rectors in 1180 with Robert de Quitfield, which confirms the existence of a church at that time.
