= Whitefield College =

Whitefield College may refer to:

- Whitefield College of the Bible, in Banbridge, Northern Ireland
- George Whitefield College, in Cape Town, South Africa
- Geneva Reformed Seminary, in Greenville, South Carolina, formerly known as Whitefield College of the Bible
- Whitefield College in Lakeland, Florida, which functions as the undergraduate degree program of Whitefield Theological Seminary
