= Richard Jones (cricketer, born 1857) =

English cricketer & lawyer (1857–1935)

Richard Stoakes Jones (14 March 1857 – 9 May 1935) was an English lawyer and a cricketer who played first-class cricket for Cambridge University, Kent and Marylebone Cricket Club. He was born at Dymchurch, Kent and died there as well.

Jones was educated at Chatham House School in Ramsgate and at Emmanuel College, Cambridge. On graduation from Cambridge University, he qualified as a solicitor and then practised in his home town for more than 50 years up to his death.

== Cricket career ==
A right-handed middle-order batsman, Jones played in first-class matches in 1877 with little success for both Cambridge University and Kent. His record in 1878 was similar, and although he made 66 for Kent against Hampshire, six other innings produced only 40 runs between them. He was given a more extended run in the Cambridge team in the 1879 season, although not notably successful, and was also picked for the University match against Oxford, but failed to score in his only innings. Later in the same season, however, he made 82 playing for Gentlemen of Kent in a game against the Gentlemen of England which was captained by W. G. Grace.

The following year he did rather better and in the Cambridge University match against the Gentlemen of England, he scored 124, his only first-class century. That brought him his second University match, but he was little more successful than in his first, scoring 1 and 2. After leaving Cambridge, Jones appeared fairly often for Kent up to 1886 and played a few times for MCC as well; he made occasional useful scores but his highest in these years was 83 for Kent against Lancashire, a match which Kent managed to lose after making Lancashire follow on.

== Bibliography ==
- Carlaw, Derek (2020). Kent County Cricketers, A to Z: Part One (1806–1914) (PDF). Cardiff: ACS.
