= Sir Herbert Whitfield =

English lawyer and landowner

Sir Herbert Whitfield (1617–1677) was an English lawyer and landowner, whose pedigree and arms were recorded in both the 1619 Visitation of Kent and the 1623 Visitation of Surrey.

== Early life ==
The eldest son and heir of Sir Ralph Whitfield, lawyer and landowner, and his wife Dorothy, daughter of the antiquary Sir John Spelman, he had a sister Dorothy and three younger brothers: Henry, Ralph and Roger.

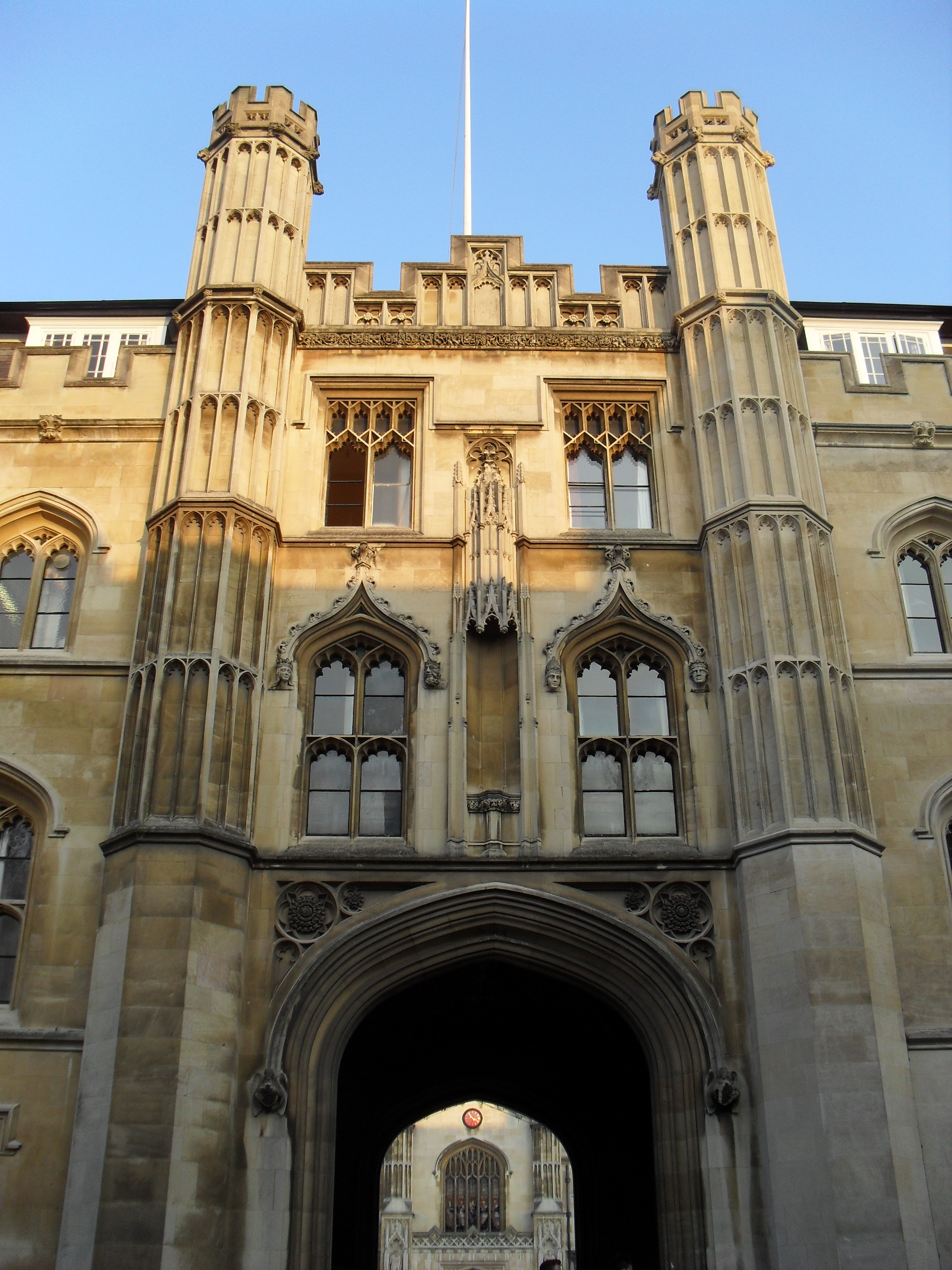
Corpus Christi College, Cambridge

He first embarked on legal training at Gray's Inn, where he was admitted on 2 March 1632, and then went on to university, being admitted to Corpus Christi College, Cambridge in 1635. Following his father as a successful lawyer in London, he was knighted on 18 June 1641 at Whitehall Palace. In 1645, jointly with his mother, he became heir to his father's lands and considerable other assets.

In 1648, a legacy of his father's work in Ireland resurfaced when the Worshipful Company of Merchant Taylors attempted to obtain evidences of their landholdings in County Londonderry. The original papers, they ascertained, were in the hands of Sir Ralph's three executors, who were his widow Dorothy; Sir Thomas Fotherley, the father of his son-in-law John Fotherley; and Herbert, his eldest son.

After 1660, he sold his father's manor of Burmarsh in Kent, but on 18 May 1675 was party to a deal over marshland at Barking in Essex.

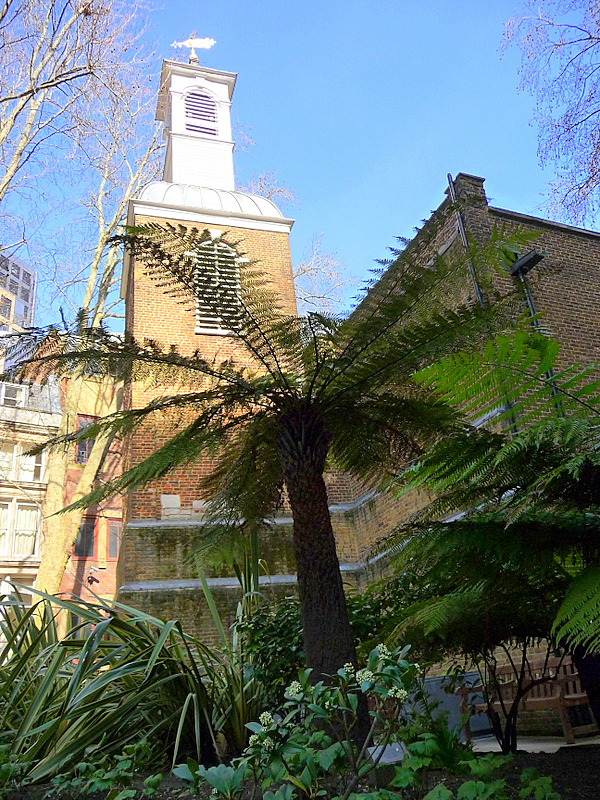
Present church of St Botolph Aldersgate

He was buried on 16 September 1677 in the church of St Botolph's, Aldersgate, London. After his death, the family's original estate at Tenterden, which his great-grandfather had acquired, was sold.

== Family ==
About 1648, he married Margaret Peirson, daughter of Richard Peirson, owner of a prosperous business in the City of London as a woollen-draper and a member of the premier livery company, the Merchant Taylors. Her mother was Elizabeth Criche, daughter of another Merchant Taylors member, Edmund Criche. Margaret's unmarried brother, Richard Peirson, became a lawyer and landowner. Margaret was born in 1622 and died after 1664. She and Herbert had seven children, including:

- Herbert (born 1650),
- Thomasine (born 1652)
- Dorothy (born 1659)
- Arabella (born about 1655), the only one known to have married and had children, who married her first cousin Ralph Whitfield (about 1651–1694)
- Henrietta (born 1659)
