= Thomas Whitfield =

Thomas Whitfield may refer to:

- Thomas Whitfield (singer) (1954–1992), American gospel singer and songwriter
- Thomas Whitfield (entrepreneur) (born 1981), British entrepreneur
- Thomas Whitfield Davidson (1876–1974), United States federal judge
