= Stephen Whitfield =

Stephen Whitfield may refer to:

- Stephen J. Whitfield, American historian
- Stephen Whitfield Swindal, American businessman
- Stephen Whitfield Dils or Steve Dils(born 1955) is an American retired football quarterback
- Steve Whitfield, Australian cricketer
