= Whitefield Christian Schools =

Coordinates: 43.8165°N 79.2298°W

- 5808 Finch Ave. East, Scarborough Ontario; Toronto, Ontario, M1B 4Y6

Information
- Enrollment: 300-350 K-12
- Website: WhitefieldChristianSchools.ca

Whitefield Christian Schools is a Private Christian Educational Institution registered with the Ontario Ministry of Education, established in 1989.

Influential people include:

- Dr. Larry Saunders - administrator and pastor of Toronto Free Presbyterian Church.
- Dr. Frank McClelland - president and pastor emeritus of Toronto Free Presbyterian Church. He has written several books and is the editor of The Canadian Revivalist.

.
