= Burmarsh =

Village in Kent, England

Coordinates: 51.049°N 0.996°E

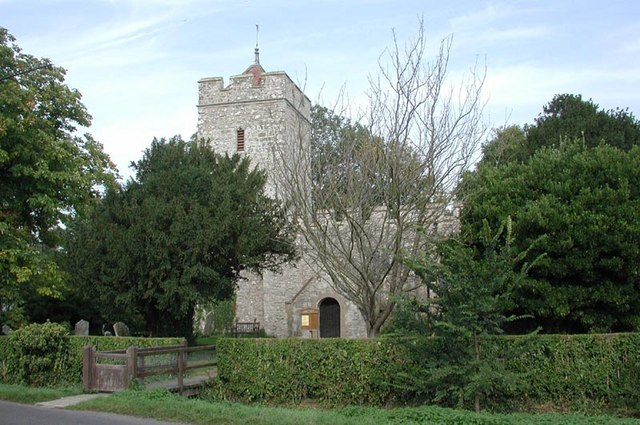
- All Saints church

- Location within Kent
- Population: 330
- District: Folkestone and Hythe
- Shire county: Kent
- Region: South East
- Country: England
- Sovereign state: United Kingdom
- Post town: Romney Marsh
- Postcode district: TN29
- Police: Kent
- Fire: Kent
- Ambulance: South East Coast
- UK Parliament: Folkestone and Hythe

Burmarsh is a village and civil parish in the Folkestone and Hythe District of Kent, England. The village is located three miles (4.8 km) west of Hythe on the Romney Marsh. The Burmarsh Road connects the village to the once fully operating Burmarsh Road train station. The closest major settlement is Folkestone which is a minimum of 9.5 mile car journey.

In the 1870s Burmarsh was described by John Marius Wilson as:

"...a parish in Romney-Marsh district, Kent; on the coast, adjacent to the Military canal... Acres, 1,796. Real property, £4,612. Pop., 170. Houses, 32."

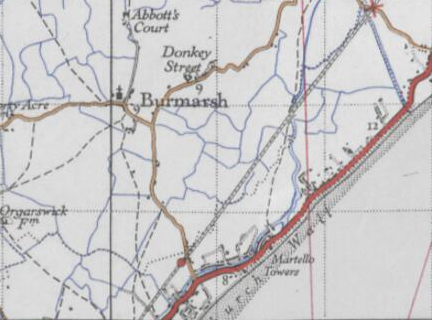
Burmarsh Kent as seen in 1945

== History ==
The meaning of Burmarsh comes from Old English. Bur comes from "Burh-Ware" which equates to "Town Dwellers, and "Mersc" which means "Marsh". Therefore, if we collaborate these, Burmarsh means "Marsh of Town Dwellers". When Burmarsh was discovered by the Romans around the year 275AD, they extracted salt from the area for use by the empire.

Burmarsh appears in the Domesday Book as both Borchemeres and Burwarmaresc. It was one of the first known settlements on the Romney Marsh. During the reign of King Æthelwulf, around the year 848AD, the King's grandson, for the sum of four thousand pence, gave the manor of Burmarsh to his friend Wynemund, who gave it to the monastery of St. Augustine. After which it remained part of the possessions of the monastery, eventually being entered in the record of the Domesday book, under the general title of the land of the church of St. Augustine in Littlestone.

== Demographics ==
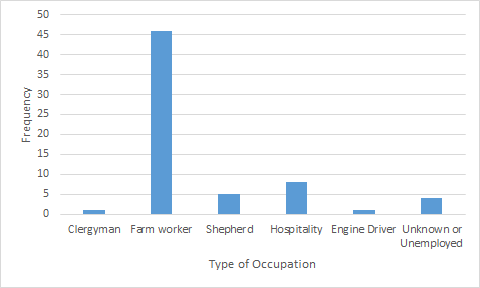
Occupation of Population of Burmarsh, Kent as reported by the 1881 Census

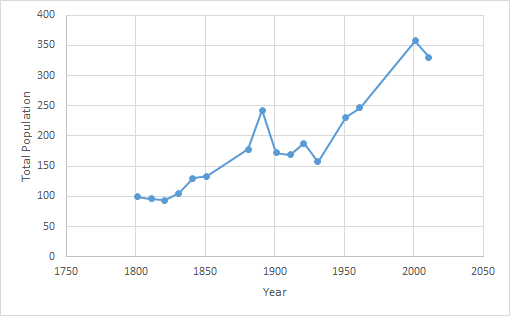
Burmarsh - Population Change over time

According to the 2011 Census there were 170 males and 160 females living in the parish. The 330 usual populace were spread out across an area of 1,724 hectares. This means the population density recorded was 0.2 hectares per person. Of the 330 people who permanently live in Burmarsh 246 of them are between 16-74. Of this figure 77 people had no qualifications which is equivalent to 28.5%. When compared to the national rate of 22.5% we can see that Burmarsh is a little higher. There are still 167 usual residents employed. This could suggest that the small, isolated nature of the parish may have something to do with a number of people working in jobs which require no qualifications. The graph of population change shows an overall rise in population size. From the 1890s up until around the year 1950 there is some oscillation in population size that could be due to World War I and World War II. After 1950 it seems like there is a sharp rise in population, there could be a link to the establishment of the National Health Service (NHS) in the year 1948.

== Church ==
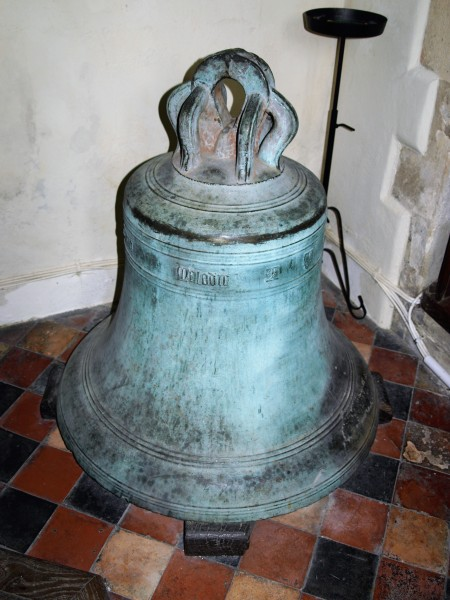
Cracked Tenor bell located in the All Saints Church in Burmarsh

The Burmarsh Parish Church is dedicated to the All Saints. The chapel was originally built in Saxon times but was extended into a church by monks of Canterbury during the Norman era, post the year 1066 (11th century). The church was expanded again in the 13th century. The west tower was built in the 15th century and the porch was then added in the 17th century. The interior was renovated in the late 19th century with the removal of the box pews, pulpit and the sound board. Two of the three original bells at the church dating back to mediaeval times (the year 1375) and are still used to this day. The other bell is cracked and can now be seen on the floor of the church.

== Train Station ==
The Burmarsh Road railway station was opened on the 16th of July 1927, when it was called Burmarsh for East Dymchurch. The station had 2 platforms, a ticket office, waiting room and signaling facilities.

Following the war the station was demoted to a 'halt', and renamed as Burmarsh Road Halt. It was closed down due to lack of use in 1948. The buildings were demolished, with exception of the roof of the waiting hall. In September 1977 the station was reopened to offer a school transport service to the Southlands Comprehensive School. The school service last ran 2015.

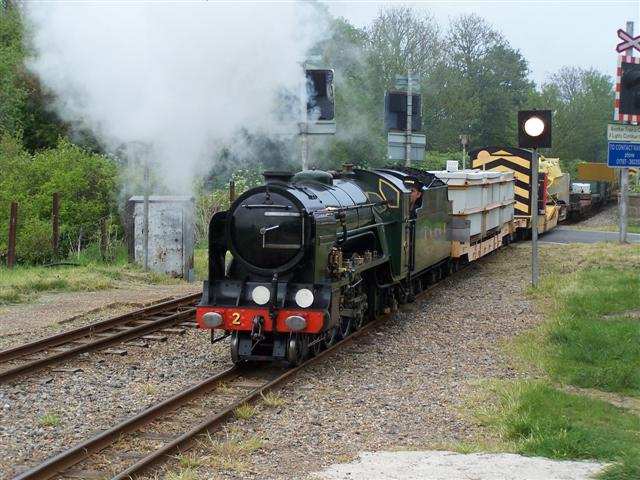
Steam train at the Burmarsh Road level crossing.
