= Hamsey =

Village and parish in East Sussex, England

Coordinates: 50.90°N 0.00°E

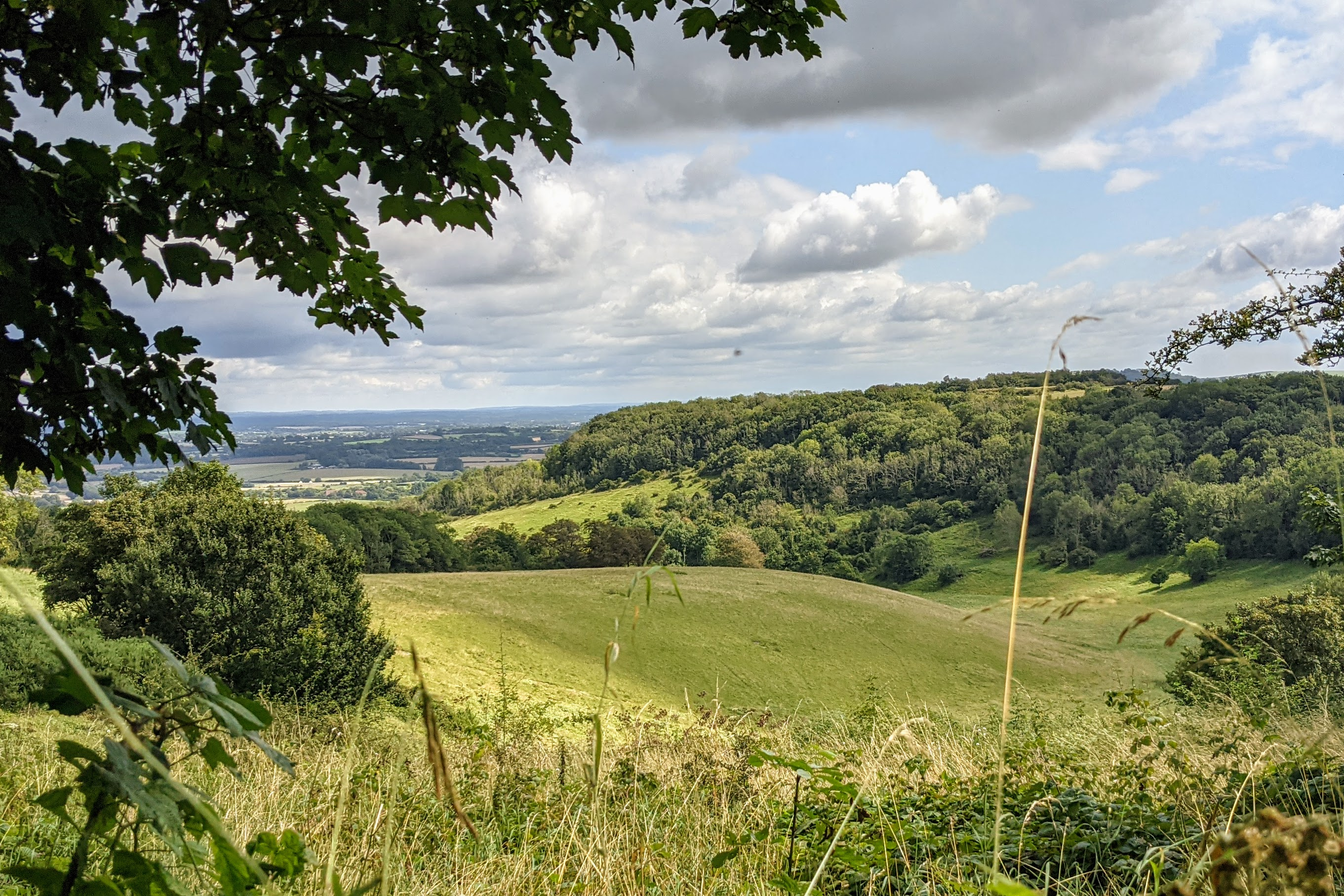
- Offham Down

- Location within East Sussex
- Area: 11.44 km^{2} (4.42 sq mi)
- Population: 632 (2011)
  - Density: 129.9/sq mi (50.2/km^{2})
- OS grid reference: TQ409128
  - London: 42 miles (68 km) N
- Civil parish: Hamsey
- District: Lewes
- Shire county: East Sussex
- Region: South East
- Country: England
- Sovereign state: United Kingdom
- Post town: LEWES
- Postcode district: BN7, BN8
- Dialling code: 01273
- Police: Sussex
- Fire: East Sussex
- Ambulance: South East Coast
- UK Parliament: East Grinstead and Uckfield
- Website: http://www.hamsey.net/

Hamsey is a village and civil parish in the Lewes district of East Sussex, England. The parish covers a large area (1,144 hectares (2,830 acres)) and also consists of the villages Offham and Cooksbridge. The main centres of population in the parish are now Offham and Cooksbridge. Around the main settlements are enlarged fields, isolated old cottages and farms. The winding and undulating parish lanes between banks, old hedge rows, trees, flowery verges and ditches are popular with cyclists and give good views of the Downs. In 2011 the parish had a population of 632.

The parish has two important tributories to the River Ouse, the Bevern Stream and the North End Stream. The North End stream serves as nationally significant spawning ground and nursery for the Sussex Sea Trout.

== Hamsey (village) ==
Notable areas around Hamsey

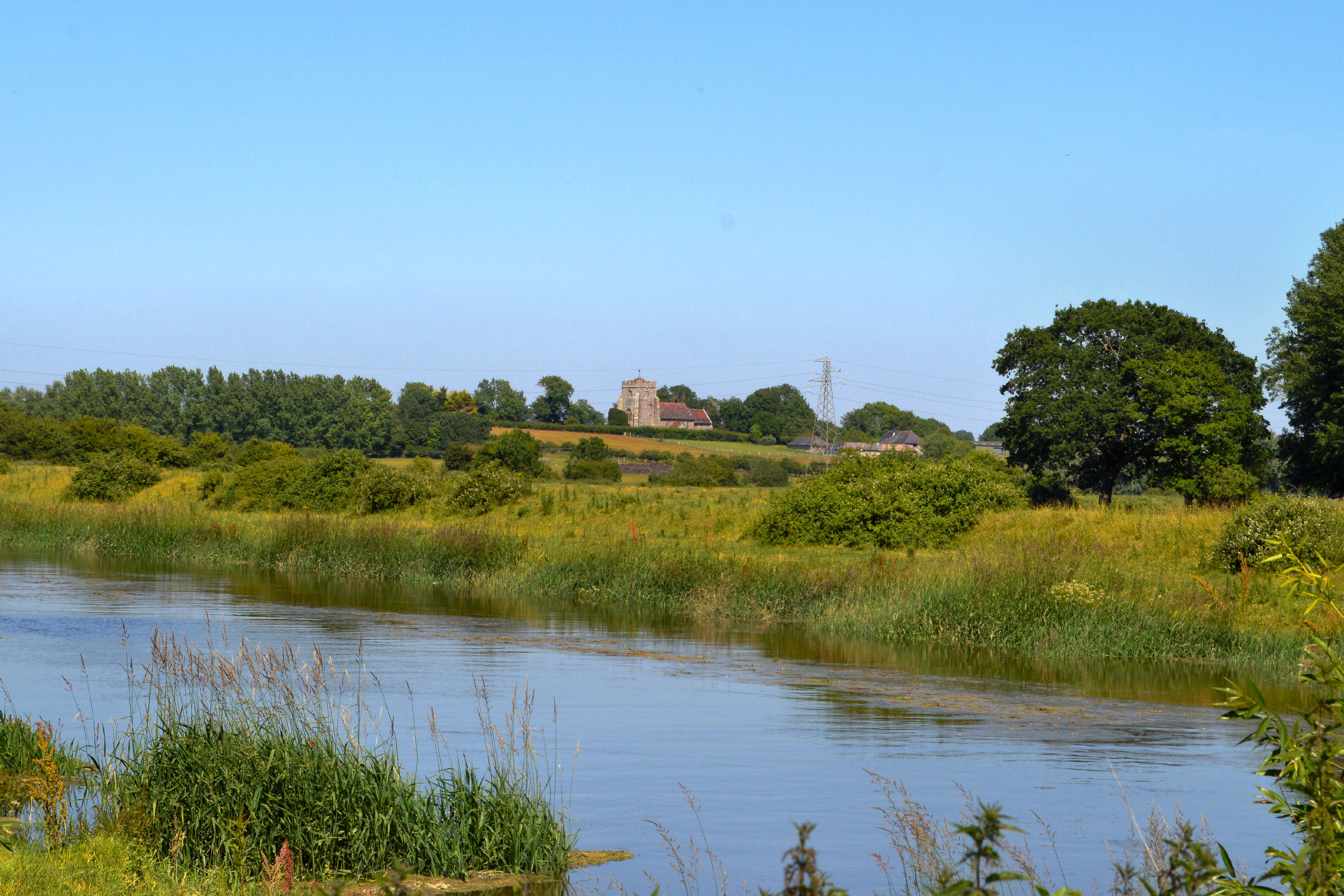
View of St Peter's Church, Hamsey from river Ouse

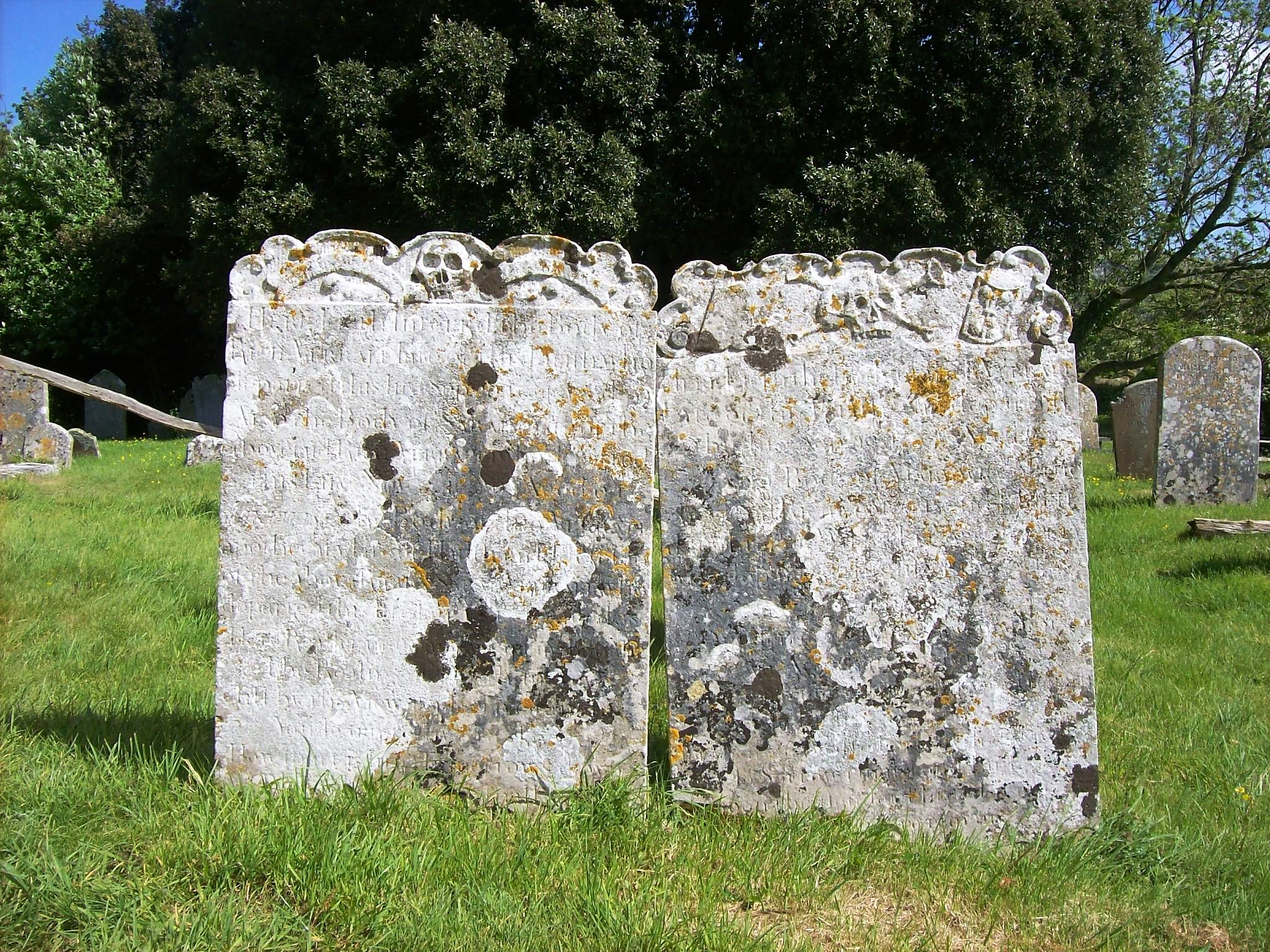
St Peter, Hamsey, 18th-century gravestones

Hamsey village itself is located three miles (5 km) north of Lewes on the Prime Meridian. It lies just off the A275 which runs between Lewes and Forest Row, although the road passes through Hamsey parish at Offham and Cooksbridge. The fine medieval ex-parish Church of Old St. Peter's (now a Chapel of Ease) sits on a promontory amongst the meadows of the River Ouse. On the neck of the promontory, by the Hamsey Cut (part of the old Ouse Navigation) the fine old barns of the prosperous farmstead of Hamsey Place have been converted to a number of dwellings, and a large new pond created, with Canada geese. From here there is a lane that ends with Old St. Peter's church. There is a group of fairly large houses on the edge of the floodplain to the north west, including the large country house Hamsey House.

Internal shifts in population and in the central focus of the then largest estate (Coombe Place) drove a decision (1859) to build a new replacement church in the hamlet of Offham (this one was also dedicated to St. Peter).

== Offham ==
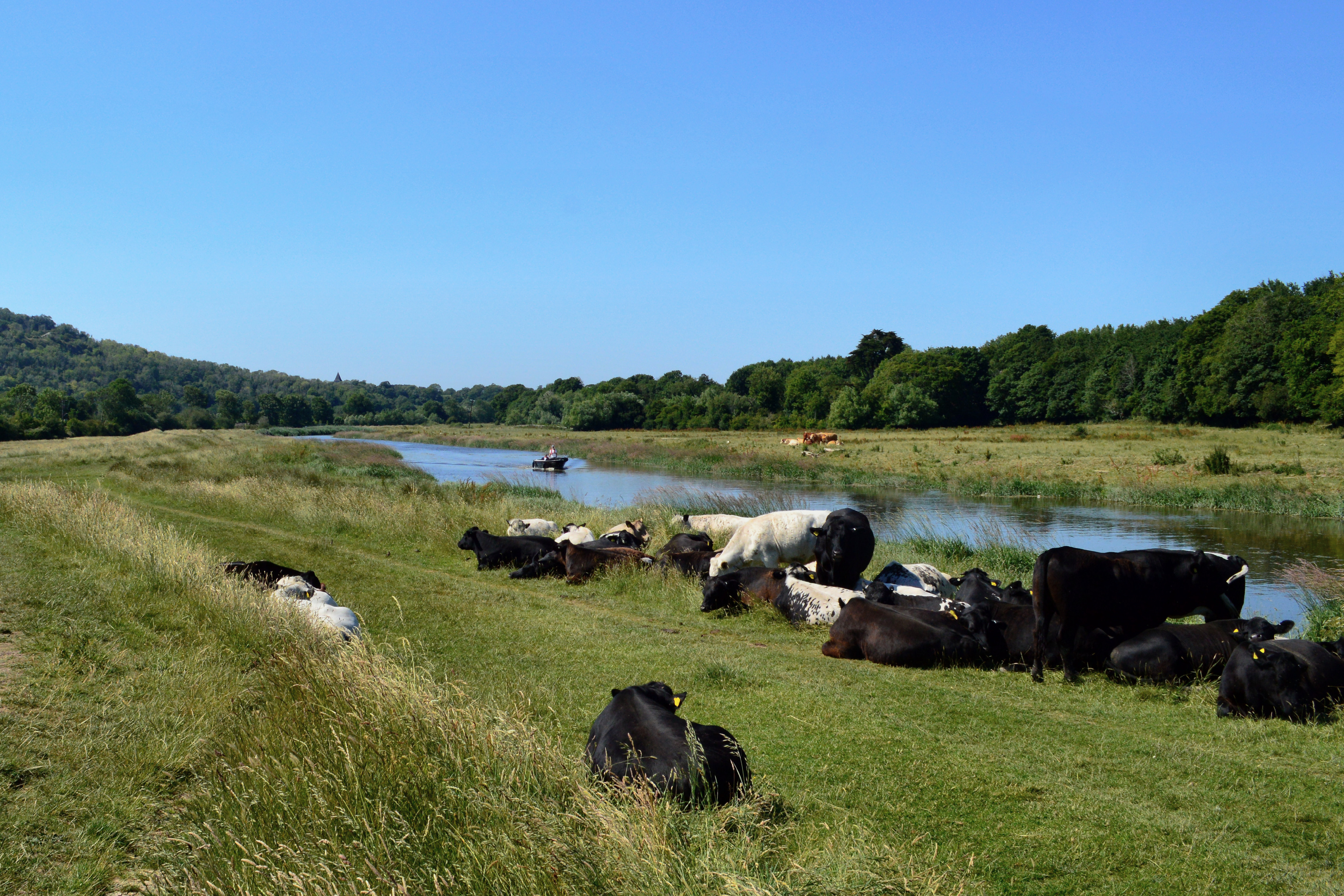
View from the river Ouse towards Offham

Pronounced "Oaf-um", this village is on the A275 just north of Lewes It has a pub, the Blacksmiths Arms and the "new" St. Peter's Church built to replace the Church of Old St. Peter in 1840s. Offham hosts two Sites of Special Scientific Interest, Clayton to Offham Escarpment and Offham Marshes.

To the west Offham has two chalk pits with a new scrub woodland surrounding them. Historically the artisanal chalk pits would have been grazed and past owners have made an effort to manage the area. The managed chalk pits were a place of rich biodiversity with many rare species and were used by local people for recreation and wild camping. More recently the chalk pits appear to have been left unmanaged and much of the grasslands have turned to scrub. Now the scrub is heavily encroaching on the Offham double-bostal on the north west side of the spur, which is extremely biodiverse. The northern chalk pit has signs threatening £20,000 fines to be issued by Natural England for wild camping on the site. They have become a running sore with local people and conservationists, although they are still very beautiful and spotted orchids and glowworms can still be found there.

== Cooksbridge ==
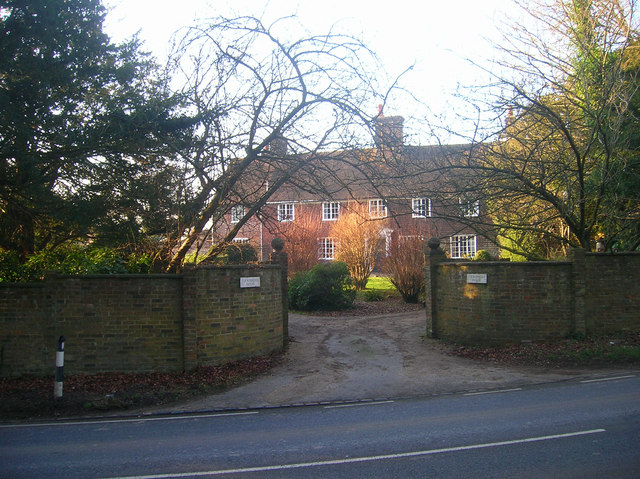
Cooksbridge House

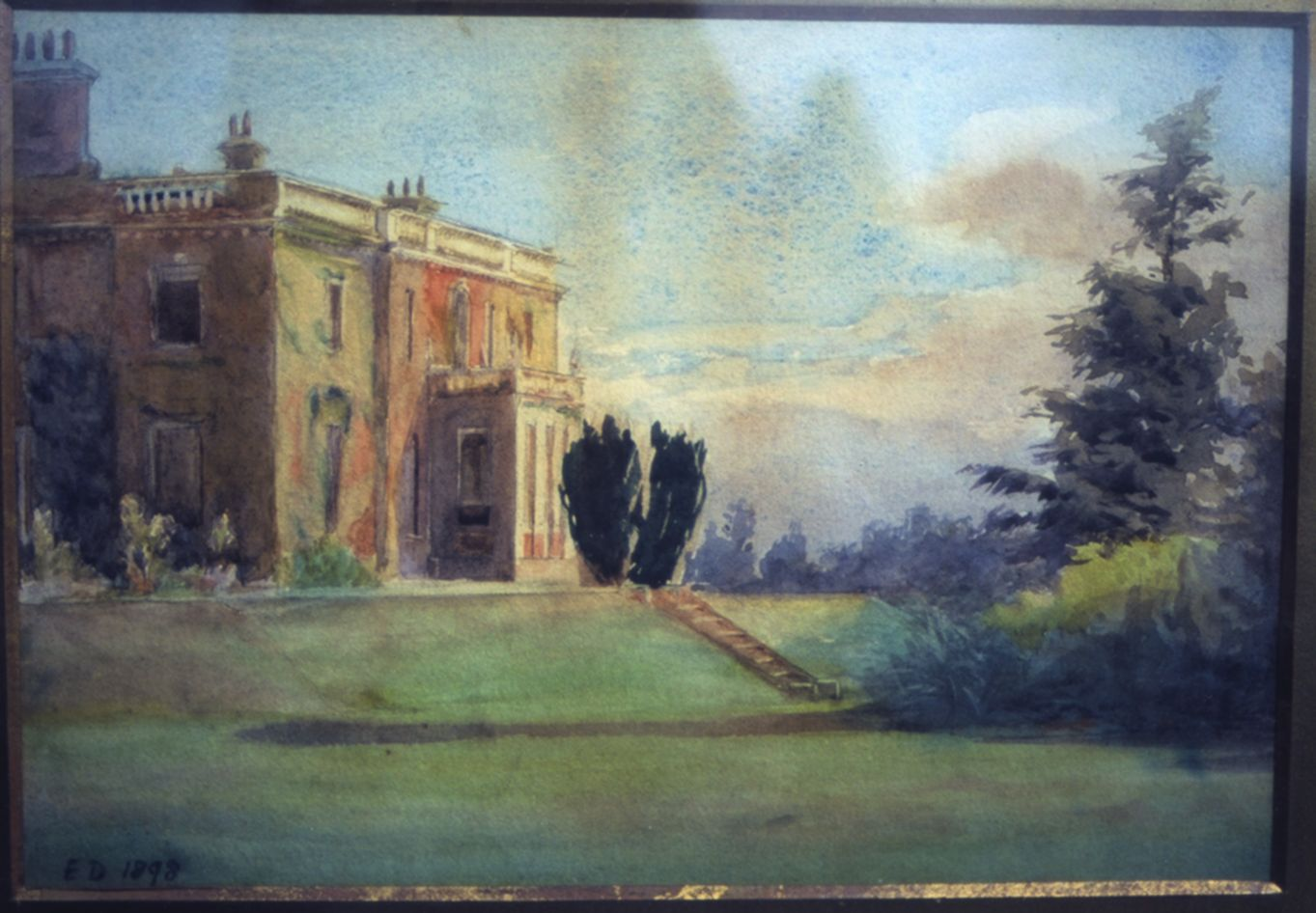
Conyboro, E. Dodson, 1898

Cooksbridge is centred on its railway station and has a primary school and a pub, the Rainbow. The name Cooksbridge is first recorded in 1590 and is likely to have come from a family of that name who were recorded in Hamsey in 1543. However, in folklore the village got its name from the cooks who fed the soldiers of Simon de Montfort from the bridge on their way to the Battle of Lewes in 1264. The troops came from nearby Fletching where they spent the night in prayer on their way to the defeat of Henry III.

In the 18th and 19th century, the road was under the control of the Offham to Wych Cross Turnpike Trust. With the coming of the railway to Cooksbridge in 1847 the trustees, no doubt concerned by the increase in traffic that the station might generate, agreed to establish a turnpike (toll road) at Cooksbridge at its meeting in Lewes on the 12 Oct 1847. It was erected adjacent to Friendly Hall.

Conyboro Park, Cooksbridge, is actually in the parish of Barcombe.

== Notable areas ==
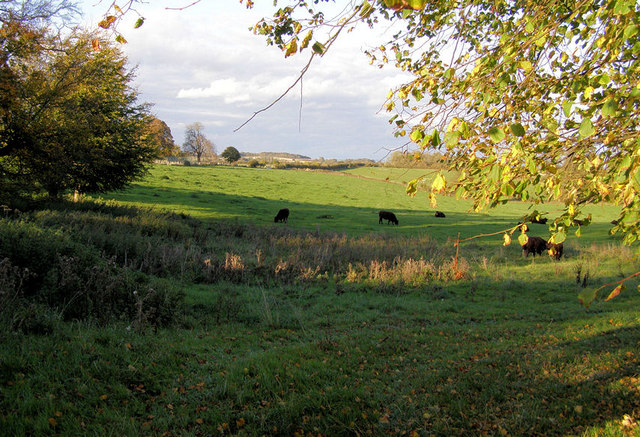
Fields at Offham East Sussex

The parish of Hamsey is large. To its north are the Chailey and Barcombe parishes, to its east is Ringmer, to its south it borders Lewes and St Ann Without and to its west is the St John Without parish.

The farmland is largely owned by the Conyboro Estate. The soil is very rich. Fine crops grow on its superficial deposits of Alluvium, River Terrace Deposits and Chalk Head, over Lower Chalk, Gault, Lower Greensand, or Wealden Clay. Nearly all the meadowland around Hamsey is now improved or cultivated, which is good for growing one crop but not for biodiversity or local species. However, there are still small areas of archaic meadow, such as the banks of the Hamsey Loop, which can host the rare corky-fruited water dropwort (recorded in 2012) and other colourful flowers. More archaic meadows can be found in Offham and Hamsey churchyards, along The Drove north side bank, on the slope beneath Coombe Plantation and between the plantation and Coombe Place.

There are two Sites of Special Scientific Interest that fall within the parish, Clayton to Offham Escarpment and Offham Marshes. Clayton to Offham Escarpment lies on the South Downs and stretches across many parishes. Its chalk grassland, woodland and scrub supporting a wide variety of breeding birds. Offham Marshes, fully contained within the parish, is an area of alluvial grazed marsh. Its biological interest is due to its large amphibian population and several other scarce insect life. The Bevern Stream and the North End Stream are key tributaries of the River Ouse catchment in East Sussex. The chalk-fed North End Stream serves as a nationally significant spawning ground and nursery for the Sussex sea trout (Salmo trutta), providing critical cold-water habitat necessary for early lifecycle stages before the fish migrate to the English Channel. Together, these watercourses form vital ecological corridors within the Ouse basin, supporting local biodiversity and river health..

The Wealden Line railway from Lewes to Uckfield via Hamsey along the west bank of the River Ouse intended to use the Hamsey Loop but work was abandoned and the loop never opened. A proposal to reinstate services between the two stations intends to use the Hamsey Loop, but much of the natural beauty of the water land corridor created by the Ouse would be under threat from such a development. A main line railway from Lewes to Uckfield is also obstructed by the Phoenix Causeway road and development.

=== Woodland ===
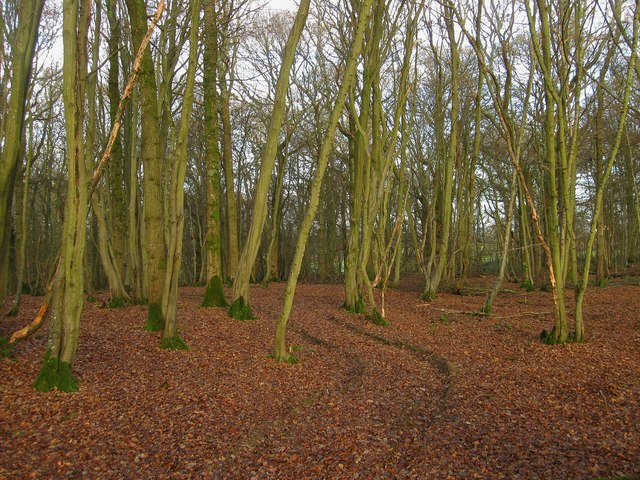
Beachy Wood

The extent of the modern Hamsey meadows is similar to that of the manor's 200 acre meadow recorded in the Domesday book but much of its wildness has been lost. In the south of the parish is very little woodland left, although the parish had a relic common at Hamsey until modern times. Despite hedge clearances, some of which are now being put back, there are a number of notable Oaks to the east of Tulleys Wells farm.

The area north of Cooksbridge, although nearer South Chailey, is still in the Hamsey parish. It has four ancient woods which is rare in the southern part of the parish. These woodland have many ancient woodland indicator species. Beachy Wood (TQ 404 161) is the best of them. It is a gill wood along the western-side of the Bevern stream with wild service, sessile oak and crab apple trees. The wood has been described as "dignified, shady, and silent but for the tops of the tall oaks sighing in the breeze". Folly Wood (TQ 399 153) has many Bluebells under hazel coppice, with some Hornbeam and much scots pine at the east and west end. River Wood (TQ 398 162) is on the southern bank of the Bevern stream and is sprawling with Ramsons (wild garlic) and Kiln Wood (TQ 399 160) is to the east of Hamsey Brickworks and has a magnificent bluebell display in Spring.

=== Rivers and streams ===
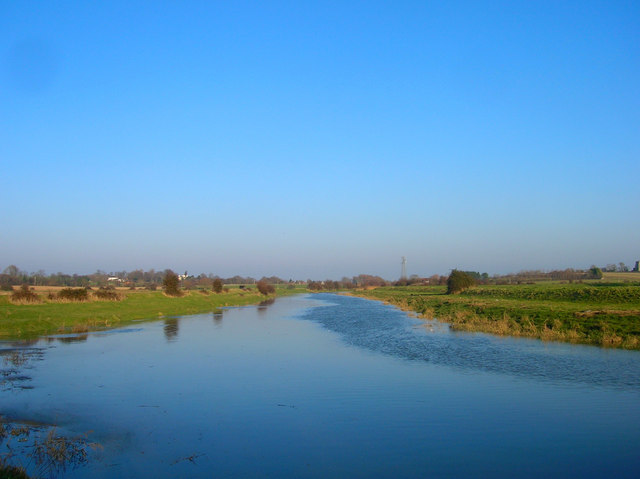
River Ouse

Running along the eastern boundary of the county is the River Ouse. The river was used extensively in the 19th century to import chalk from the Offham Chalk pits. The Upper Ouse Navigation was opened in 1812 and the Chalkpit Cut took barges from Offham chalk pit to the River Ouse, and two railway lines were built across the brooks. Up until that point wild Salmon and Sea Trout were plentiful in the river but the canalisation seems to have impacted the young Salmons' ability to use the river. After the collapse of the navigation in 1870 Salmon recolonised the Ouse until the hot summer of 1976 and the new weir at Buxted eliminated the last breeding group.

The Bevern Stream is a rich and biodiverse stream on the north-south border of the Hamsey and Chailey parishes. It is a direct, major tributary of the Ouse (joining near Barcombe Mills). The North End Stream is a smaller, chalk-fed stream that flows into the Ouse (on the boundary of Hamsey and Barcombe parishes).

The Hamsey parish is central to conservation efforts aimed at reversing local biodiversity loss, with a particular focus now on protecting the sea trout (Salmo trutta) in the River Ouse catchment. The Bevern and the North End Stream serve as nationally significant spawning ground and nursery for the species, which is designated as a Species of Principal Importance under the Natural Environment and Rural Communities Act 2006.

Despite the North End Stream's importance to a keystone indicator species, the local sea trout population faces ongoing threats from habitat degradation, pollution, and proposed nearby housing developments that risk damaging critical spawning beds through siltation and runoff. In response, local conservation groups and authorities, including Lewes District Council, Lewes Town Council, and Hamsey Parish Council, have formally supported the Charter of Rights for the River Ouse to secure legal and environmental protections for the river and its tributaries. A mass trespass was held in August 2026 to raise awareness of the plight of the stream in the face of the proposed developments.

=== Offham Marshes ===
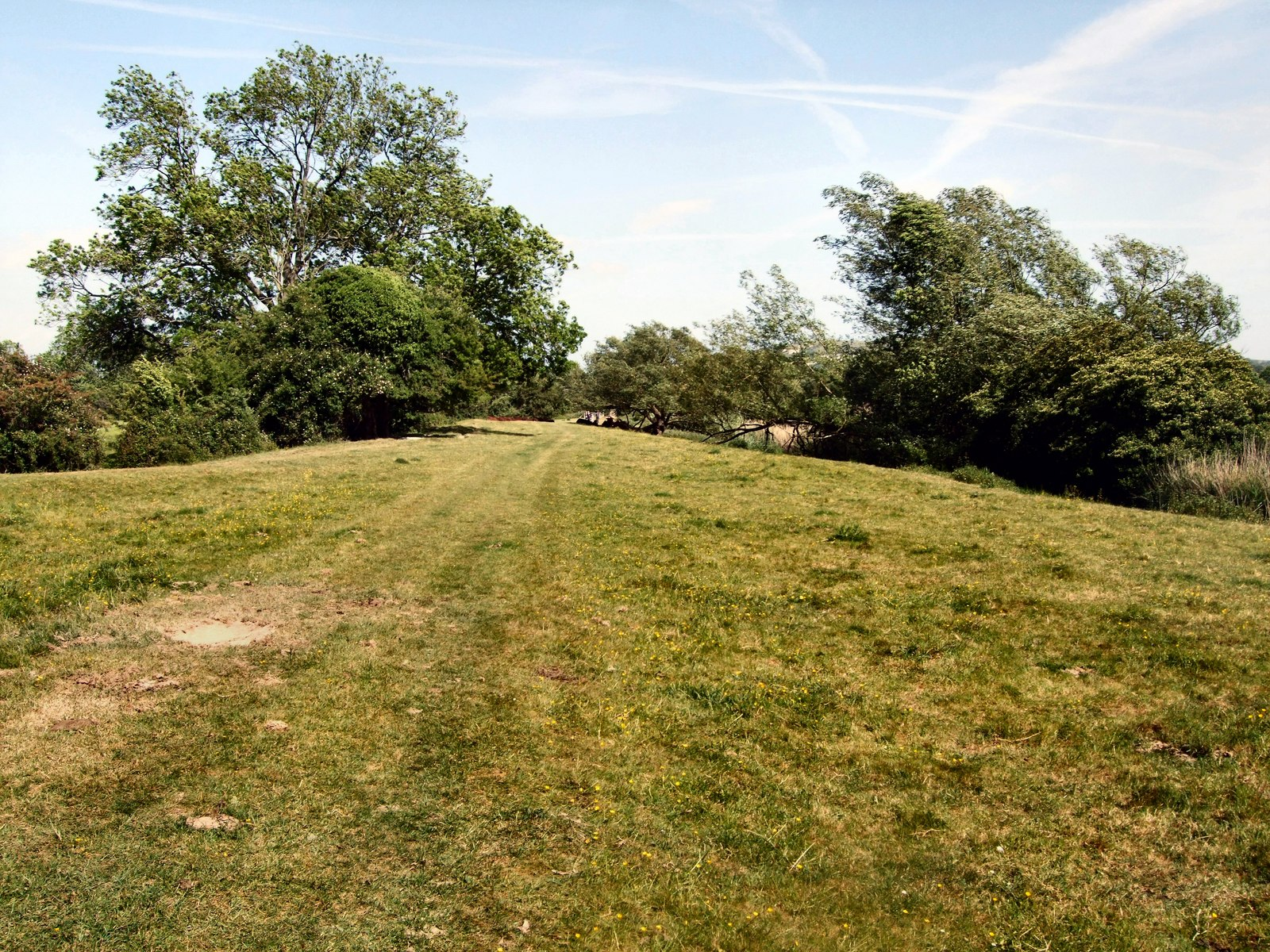
Chalkpit cut, Offham

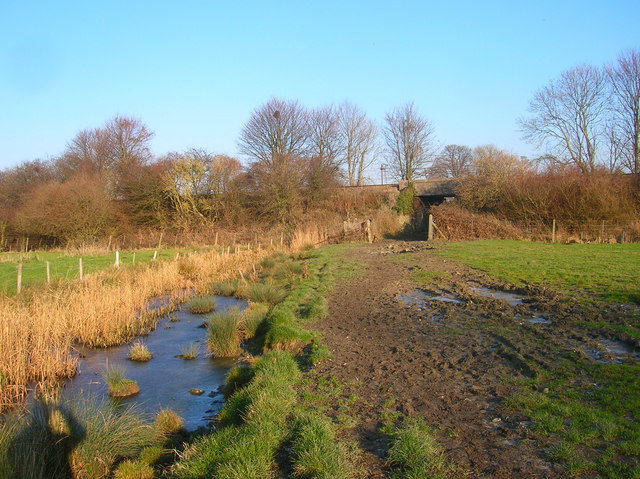
Pellbrook Cut

Between the Ouse and Offham Hill is the Offham Marsh (TQ 403 118), also known as the Pells. It is a 39.1-hectare (97-acre) biological Site of Special Scientific Interest to the west of the Ouse. It includes the Pellbrook Cut, an area to the north of it called The Pells and the marshland to the south of the Cut and east of the railway track. It was designated SSSI status in 1989 because of its huge Common Toad population. The toads migrated in huge numbers every spring from the overhanging woods.

=== Scarp and downland ===
To the south of the parish, the land rises into the Sussex Downs. It is last parish (or first) of the Clayton to Offham Escarpment which is a ten kilometre stretch of north-facing scarp that has been designed a Site of Special Scientific Interest.

==== Offham Hill ====
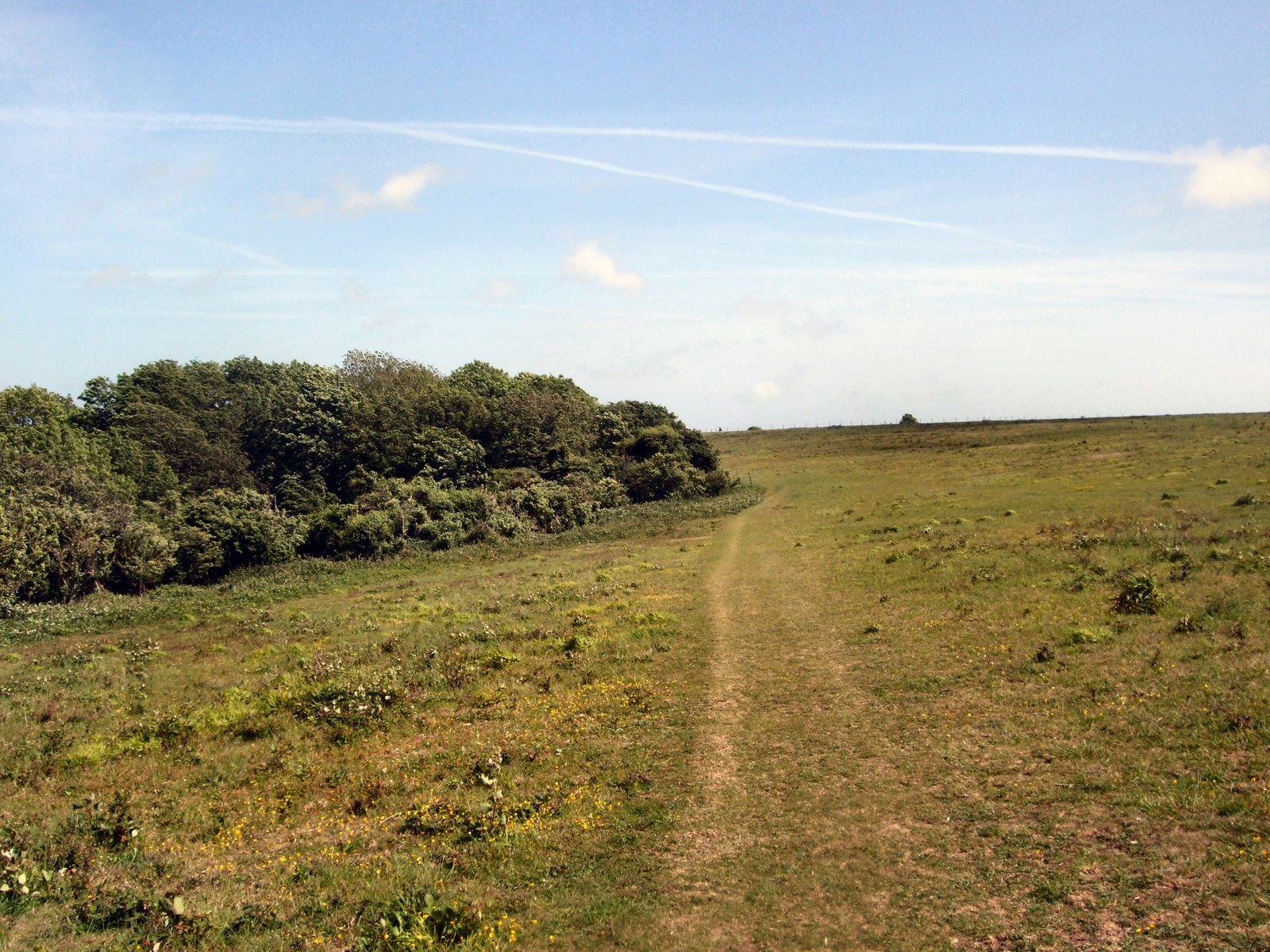
South Downs Way path near Offham Hill

There is a chain of disused chalk pits along the Ouse river cliff and around the spur of Offham Hill (TQ 400 116). The areas is prized by mountain bikers, picnickers, walkers and all those who like flowers, sun and peace.

Most of the chalk pits are pre-industrial in origin and fine sheep fescue sward has grown over them, giving them distinct qualities and richness. In contrast, the pit above the Chalk Pit Inn was active in the nineteenth century. The Offham Road, outside the Inn, goes over a steep chute which took chalk from the Pit down to barges moored on the Chalkpit Cut. This late Georgian pit is very different in character to the older quarries. Unlike the alpine cragginess of this pit the older pits meld into the adjacent Downland at their northern end. In the past they were grazed as part of those Down pastures and bee, pyramidal, spotted and even musk orchids can be found there, with viper’s bugloss, devil’s-bit and small-flowered sweet-briar. The turf is very mossy and scarce mosses and lichen such as Pleurochaete squarrosa and Cladonia pocillum can be found.

The southern-most of these older quarries (TQ 400 113) south of the Chalk Pit Inn pit, may be one of the oldest, for it has the indicator species bastard toadflax, horseshoe vetch and rockrose. The thin open sward enables blue fleabane and autumn gentian to thrive and many chalkland butterflies benefit.

The chalk pits support a diverse range of species, although the absence of grazing has resulted in increasing scrub encroachment. Cotoneaster, privet, sycamore, ash, and other scrub species have spread across the river cliffs and the brow of Offham Hill, which were open grasslands before the Second World War. Grazing has been proposed as a means of controlling this succession and preserving the area's chalk grassland habitat and associated wildlife.

There is half of a Neolithic causewayed camp (TQ 398 117) on the spur of Offham Hill, although there is no sign of it above ground now. The chalk pit dug away the rest. There are also three surviving barrows between the camp and the covered reservoir, but they are becoming difficult to see under tangled vegetation. The covered reservoir, like so many, had a good Down pasture flora with rockrose, cistus forester moth, and old anthills.

==== Offham Down ====
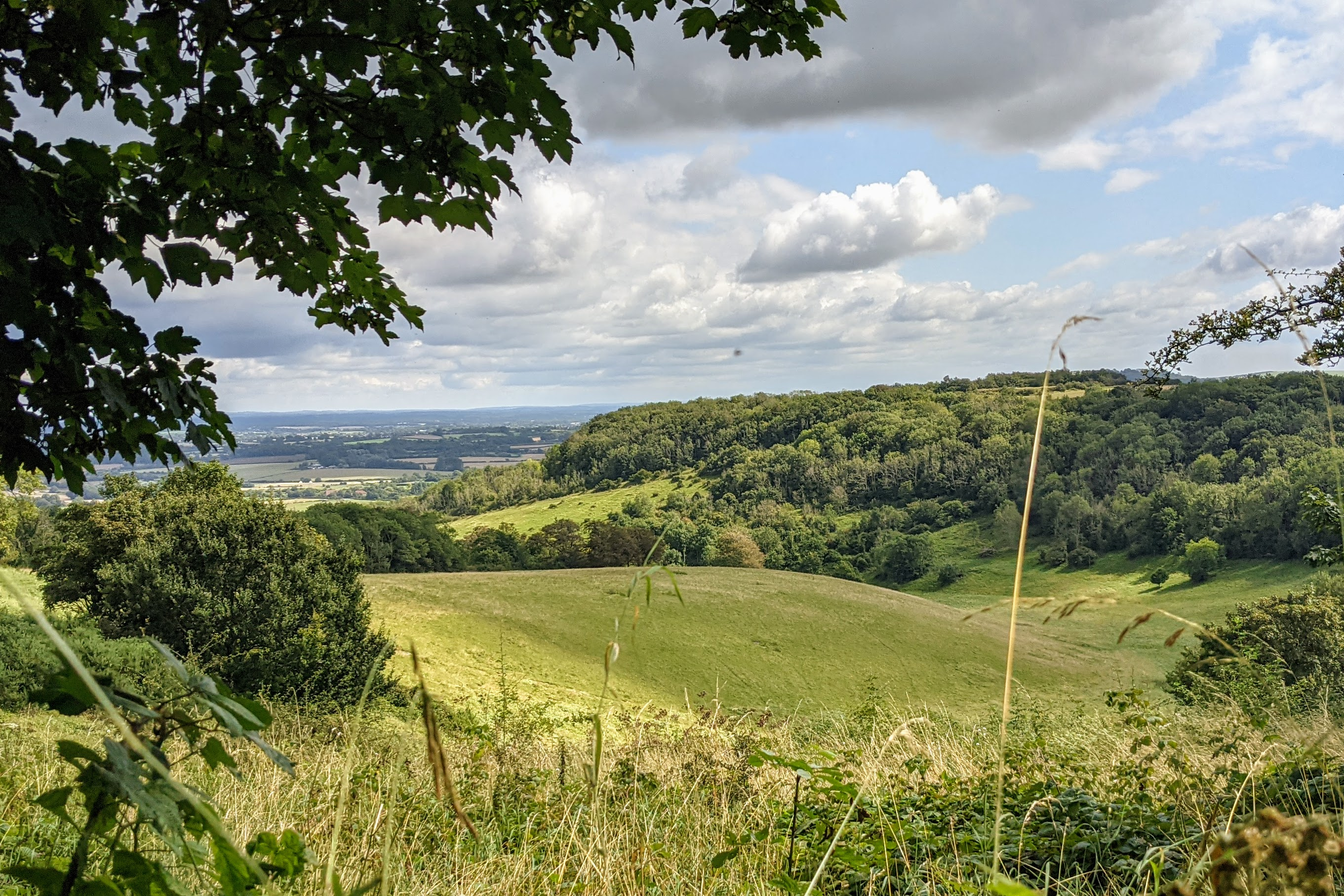
Offham Down, East Sussex, looking north towards Offham village and Hamsey

Offham Down (TQ 392 117) is a special place known locally as "Happy Valley" at the east side of the Clayton to Offham Escarpment SSSI. The valley sides are rich in biodiversity in all seasons. In spring they have milkwort, cowslip and lesser dandelion. At midsummer there are glow-worms and bastard toadflax. In high summer there is pride of Sussex rampion and, later, sheets of devil's-bit scabious. There are areas of acidic soils, and in these areas heathy plants, rare on chalk grassland, may still be present, such as heath dog-violet and mosses like Bryum rubens and Pleurochaete squarrosa. In autumn there are still old meadow fungi, including many species of waxcaps, earth tongues, coral fungi and pink gill. There used to be purple heather on the crown of Offham Hill for which it gained it the nickname ‘Little Scotland’ in Victorian times. It is secondary woodland, now.

The area has a long history too. There is an evocative group of ten Saxon barrows on the short turfed, flatter ground of the spur, and further barrows up the hill but there are either destroyed or sunk in tangled scrub. There is a peculiar and attractive two-track ancient bostal which rises up the valley side from Offham. It is thought that after marching from Fletching, the London troops under Simon De Montfort walked up this bostal on the dawn of the day of the Battle of Lewes. They will have risen to the spur, which Coombe Plantation now partly covers, and formed the left flank of the rebel army. Poorly armed and trained they were swept away back down the scarp by the royalist cavalry, before the cavalry over-reached themselves and De Montfort's other troops battled down into Lewes and victory.

Things could be very different on Offham Down if it were not for the action of conservationists at the turn of the twentieth century. Although it is part of an SSSI, in 1997 the farmer wished to plough much of the tractor accessible ground to grow flax, which was then attracting hefty European Union subsidies even on such protected sites. English Nature did not to use their powers and the farmer commenced ploughing. Nature conservationists attempted to block the plough, but the farmer returned at night. The struggle then escalated and conservationists demonstrated, set up camp on the land and started to organize its ‘unploughing’ by turning over and refitting the sods. Local people also turned out in force. Luckily the battle took place during the general election, so the Conservatives and Labour competed to show their conservation mettle and the special downland scarp was saved.

==== Coombe Plantation ====
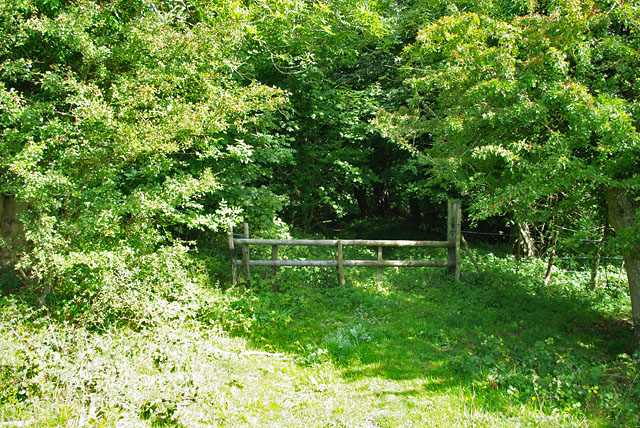
Path into Coombe Plantation

The Coombe Plantation (TQ 386 122) is to the west of Offham Down. It is a relatively young wood, planted around 1800 which runs up the scarp slope of the Downs. Above the south west corner of the woodland are the Blackcap and Mount Harry peaks. The plantation has a cool and lofty interior of tall ash, sycamore, surviving beech and occasional horse chestnut. The biggest trees are along the lower boundary, although many were blown down in the 1987 and 1992 gales, particularly at its eastern end. The fallen beech carcasses are home to many fungi including green stain, turkey tail, lemon disco, jelly rot, porcelain fungus and dryad's saddle. Collared earthstar is here amongst the leaf litter. The spring flowers are most plentiful at the base of slope. Elsewhere things like bluebells are scarce, although there are swarms of early purple orchids upslope. In the shadier parts, such as along the bostal, there are profuse growths of hart's tongue fern.

==== Mount Harry ====
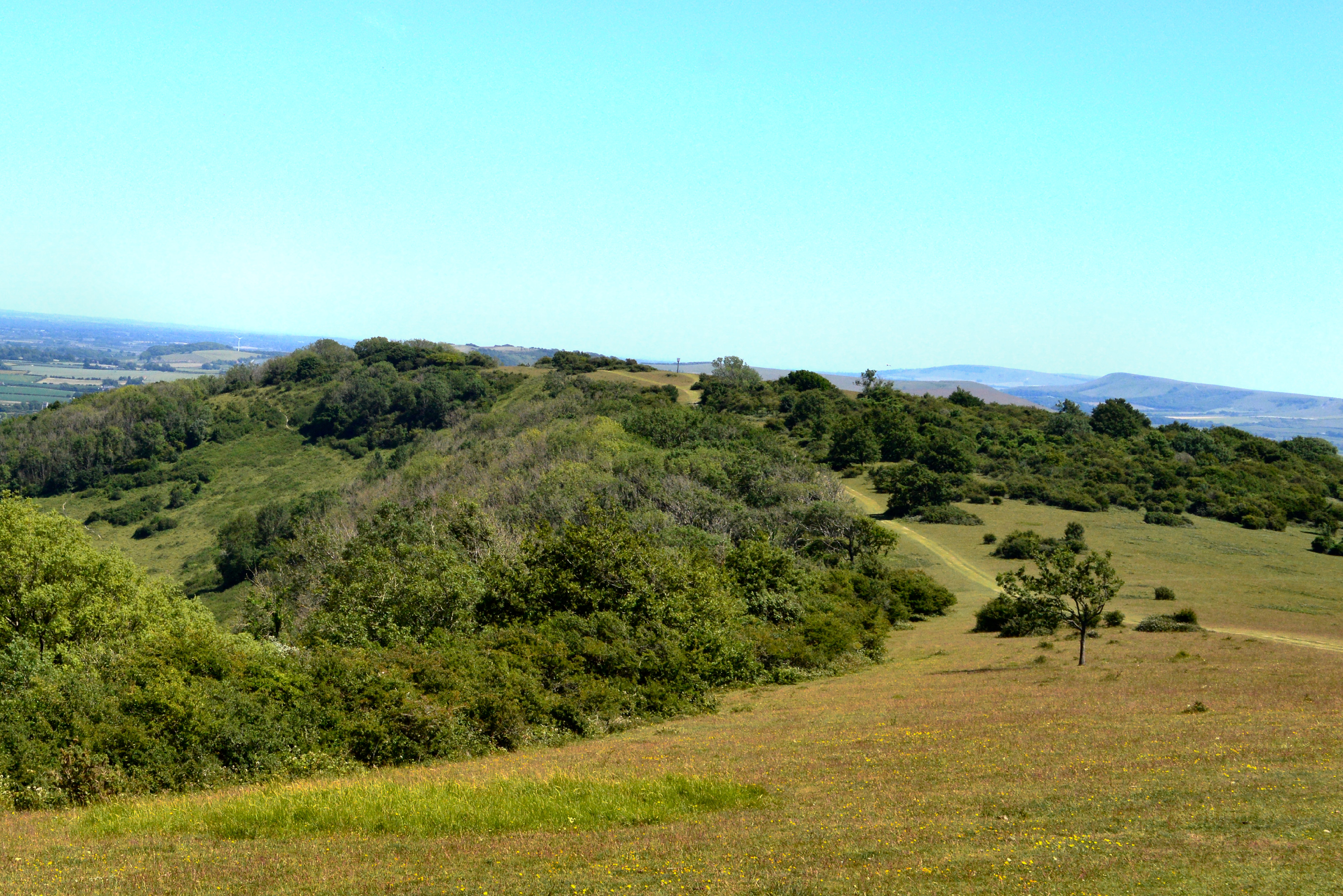
View of Mount Harry from Blackcap

At the top of the scarp top is Mount Harry. At 194 metres (636 ft), the hill falls within the National Trust Blackcap nature reserve. This area retains some rich ancient grassland fragments, especially where the slope begins to tip northwards. There have been frog, bee and even birds-nest orchids and there are tiny fragments of heathy grassland. In autumn the waxcap fungal flora and as many as twenty one old meadow fungal species have been counted here.

Mount Harry’s name probably indicates that it was used as a pagan shrine, or hearg, in early Saxon times, like the although the name was first recorded only in 1610. Others have speculated that Mount Harry, then Mountharry, was named after King Henry III as it was here that Henry III was defeated by the troops of Simon de Montfort in 1264 at the Battle of Lewes. This seems less likely though. The original name of Blackcap appears to have been Mount Harry, while the hill now known as Mount Harry was called Lewes Beacon.

==== Landport Bottom ====
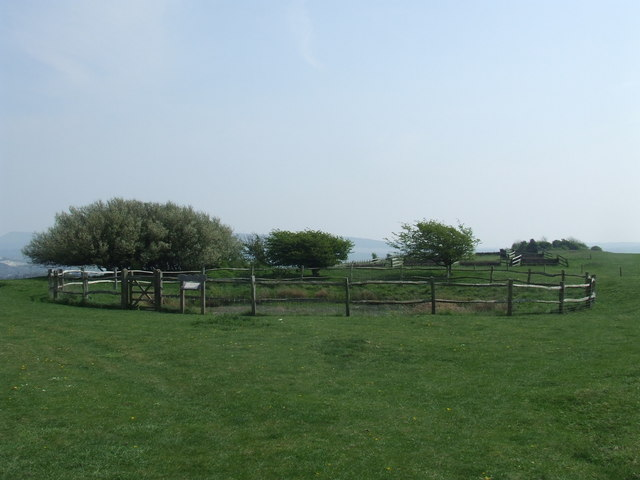
Jill's Pond, Landport Bottom, near Lewes

Landport Bottom (TQ 397 110), near Lewes but in the Hamsey parish, was a medieval river crossing according to records in 1296. Lewes Council bought 110 acres of ex-arable in the Bottom, principally to stop soil erosion from irresponsible winter ploughing. At Landport Fork (TQ 401 110) there are three fine barrows.

=== Hamsey brickworks ===
Often considered to be in South Chailey, Hamsey Brickworks, is in the very north of the parish. It worked the Wealden Clay to make bricks until the late 1980s. After working ceased an almost complete fossil of a bony fish was found there, which 130 million years old. The landfilled quarry has a large pond which is home to tufted duck and great crested grebe, with many mayflies in summer dancing above it - and feeding the swallows that skim the water to eat them. To the south of the pond, "flaming gorse" separates the brickworks from Kiln Wood. Recently the area has been approved for redevelopment into housing,
