= Kinnaird =

Kinnaird is originally a Scottish Gaelic topographical term, ceann ard, meaning "high headland".

Kinnaird may refer to:

== Places ==
=== Canada ===
- Kinnaird, British Columbia, a neighbourhood in Castlegar, British Columbia

=== Scotland ===
- Kinnaird, Angus, village in Angus, Scotland, location of Kinnaird Castle and birthplace of Sir James Carnegie, 5th Baronet
- Kinnaird, Atholl, village in Atholl (northern Perthshire), Scotland
- Kinnaird, Gowrie, village in Gowrie (southern Perthshire), Scotland
- Kinnaird, Stirlingshire, estate of the Bruces of Airth in Stirlingshire, Scotland, see James Bruce
- Kinnaird Head, promontory in Aberdeenshire, Scotland

== People ==
Kinnaird is a Scottish surname, some notable people with name include:

- Alison Kinnaird
- Dayne Kinnaird
- Douglas Kinnaird
- Eleanor Kinnaird, American politician
- Emily Kinnaird
- Gertrude Kinnaird
- Maria Kinnaird
- Mary Jane Kinnaird
- Malcolm Kinnaird
- Nicky Kinnaird, Belfast born founder of Space NK
- Paul Kinnaird
- Samuel W. Kinnaird
- Lt Col Charles Henry Kinnaird MC

Middle name:

- Charles Kinnaird Graham
- Charles Kinnaird Mackellar
- William Kinnaird Rose

Given name:

- Kinnaird Ouchterlonie
- Kinnaird R. McKee, American United States Navy four star admiral

== Other uses ==
- Kinnaird College for Women University, Women's college in Lahore, Punjab
- Lord Kinnaird, including a list of bearers of the title
