= George Kinnaird =

George Kinnaird may refer to:

- George Kinnaird, 9th Lord Kinnaird (1807–1878), Scottish politician
- George Kinnaird, 7th Lord Kinnaird (1754–1805), Scottish aristocrat, virtuoso, and banker
- George Kinnaird, 1st Lord Kinnaird (c. 1622–1689), Scottish aristocrat
