= Emily Kinnaird =

English missionary and writer

- Emily Kinnaird CBE in 1918
- Born: 20 October 1855; London, England
- Died: September 1947 (aged 91)
- Occupation: Missionary

Hon. Emily Cecilia Kinnaird CBE (20 October 1855 – September 1947) was an English missionary and writer. She was active for the Young Women's Christian Association and she had a long association with India.

== Life ==
Kinnaird was born in London in 1855. She was the last of the six surviving children. Her mother was Mary Jane Kinnaird who founded what would become the Young Women's Christian Association just before Emily was born. Her father was Arthur Kinnaird who was an M.P. and a banker.

Her mother was a powerful force for good causes although she did not believe in public speaking or in women's suffrage. Her mother and father were usually of one mind but her father did believe in women's suffrage. Emily was secretary of the London branch of the YWCA and she used this position to assist the Indian Female Normal School and Instruction Society.

In 1889 she and her elder sister, Gertrude, became missionaries to India. They did return occasionally and in 1905-6 Emily was the vice president of the Scottish branch of the Zenana Bible and Medical Missionary Society. She was very interested in the YWCA but her life can be partly judged by her 1944 book My Adopted Country, 1889–1944 which was published in India at Lucknow. However she worked in Britain too. During World War one she, and the YMCA, created 300 centres that could be exploited by WAACs and other war workers. Emily is recognised for building on her mothers work in founding the YWCA. Unlike her mother she did speak publicly and not only on religion but also on business matters. In 1918 her work was recognised when she was given an OBE. Four years later she was promoted to be a CBE.

In 1920 she helped to found the Indian Students' Union and Hostel in Gower Street in London.

Kinnaird died in September 1947 and a memorial service was held for her at Queen Mary Hall the YWCA building in Campden.

== Works ==
- My Adopted Country, 1889–1944
- Reminiscences
