= Arthur Kinnaird =

Arthur Kinnaird may refer to:

- Arthur Kinnaird, 10th Lord Kinnaird (1814–1887), Scottish banker, Liberal politician and evangelical clergyman
- Arthur Kinnaird, 11th Lord Kinnaird (1847–1923), principal of The Football Association and leading footballer
