= Knapp =

Knapp or Knapp's may refer to:

- Knapp (surname)

== Places ==
- Knapp, Hampshire, England, a village in the parish of Ampfield
- Knapp, Somerset, England
- Knapp, Wiltshire, England
- Knapp, Perthshire, Scotland
- Knapp, Dunn County, Wisconsin, United States, a village
- Knapp, Jackson County, Wisconsin, United States, a town
- Knapp Creek (West Virginia), United States
- Knapp's Castle, Santa Barbara County, California, United States
- Knapp's Covered Bridge

== Companies ==
- Bill Knapp's, a defunct restaurant chain in Michigan
- Knapp's or J.W. Knapp Company, a defunct department store chain in Michigan

== Other uses ==
- Knapp Commission, an investigation into corruption in the New York Police Department from 1970 to 1972
- USS Knapp (DD-653), United States Navy destroyer
- Komitet Narodowy Amerykanów Polskiego Pochodzenia (KNAPP), the National Committee of Americans of Polish Extraction (1942-1959)
