= Sheikh Badin National Park =

National park in Pakistan

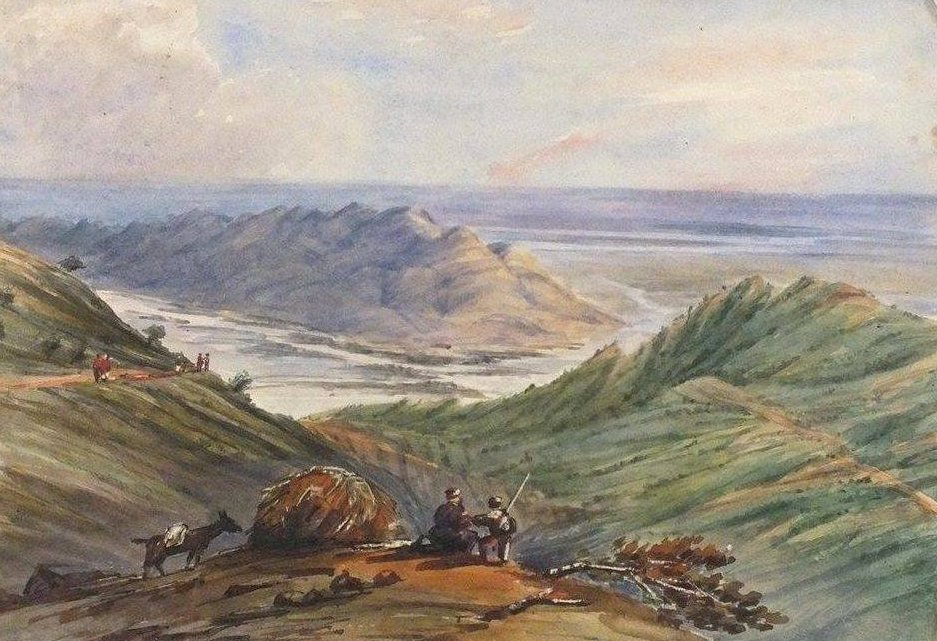
View of Sheikh Budeen from Picnic Hill (1864) by Henry Brabazon Urmston

Sheikh Badin National Park (also spelled Sheikh Badddin National Park) is located near Darra Pezu in the Dera Ismail Khan and Lakki Marwat districts of Khyber Pakhtunkhwa, Pakistan. It is located among the Sheikh Badin Hills, which is an eastern extension of the Sulaiman Mountains. The park was established in 2003 and covers an area of 15,540 hectares. Here live two tribes one of which are mughals who came here after war of independence against Britain in 1857 and the others are syed who claim to be descendants of shiekh Abdul Qadir Jelaani.

During the research of the bird population in the park, 41 species were found, about 3408 individuals. Of these, 18 species were migratory birds.

During research 23 herpetofauna species, including 2 amphibians and 21 reptiles, were observed.

Scientific research work published on the basis of research and identification of flora in the park, revealed 107 plant species.

== Wildlife ==
=== Avifauna ===
Name of animal	Scientific name	Status	Type
Shikra	Accipiter badius	Least-concerned	Migratory
Common buzzard	Buteo buteo	Least-concerned	Migratory
Alpine swift	Tachymarptis melba	Least-concerned	Migratory
Eurasian hoopoe	Upupa epops	Least-concerned	Migratory
Red-wattled lapwing	Vanellus indicus	Least-concerned	Resident
Eurasian collared dove	Streptopelia decaocto	Least-concerned	Resident
Red collared dove	Streptopelia tranquebarica	Least-concerned	Resident
Spotted dove	Spilopelia chinensis	Least-concerned	Resident
Rock pigeon	Columba livia	Least-concerned	Resident
Indian roller	Coracias benghalensis	Least-concerned	Migratory
Blue-cheeked bee-eater	Merops persicus	Least-concerned	Resident
Asian green bee-eater	Merops orientalis	Least-concerned	–
Asian koel	Eudynamys scolopaceus	Least-concerned	Resident
Pied Cuckoo	Clamator jacobinus	Least-concerned	Migratory
Greater coucal	Centropus sinensis	Least-concerned	Resident
Common kestrel	Falco tinnunculus	Least-concerned	Migratory
Black francolin	Francolinus francolinus	Least-concerned	Resident
Chukar partridge	Alectoris chukar	Least-concerned	Resident
Common quail	Coturnix coturnix	Least-concerned	Migratory
Grey francolin	Ortygornis pondicerianus	Least-concerned	Resident
See-see partridge	Ammoperdix griseogularis	Least-concerned	Resident
Bay-backed shrike	Lanius vittatus	Least-concerned	Migratory
Red-backed shrike	Lanius collurio	Least-concerned	Migratory
Common myna	Acridotheres tristis	Least-concerned	Resident
European stonechat	Saxicola rubicola	Least-concerned	Resident
Indian robin	Copsychus fulicatus	Least-concerned	Migratory
Isabelline Wheatear	Oenanthe isabellina	Least-concerned	Migratory
Grey bush chat	Saxicola ferreus	Least-concerned	Resident
Baya weaver	Ploceus philippinus	Least-concerned	Resident
Black-breasted weaver	Ploceus benghalensis	Least-concerned	Resident
Black drongo	Dicrurus macrocercus	Least-concerned	Resident
House sparrow	Passer domesticus	Least-concerned	Resident
Spanish Sparrow	Passer hispaniolensis	Least-concerned	Migratory
Eurasian golden oriole	Oriolus oriolus	Least-concerned	Resident
House crow	Corvus splendens	Least-concerned	Resident
Purple sunbird	Cinnyris asiaticus	Least-concerned	Migratory
Red-vented bulbul	Pycnonotus cafer	Least-concerned	Resident
Rock martin	Ptyonoprogne fuligula	Least-concerned	Migratory
Rufous-fronted prinia	Prinia buchanani	Least-concerned	Migratory
Western Orphean warbler	Sylvia hortensis	Least-concerned	Migratory
Rufous-tailed scrub robin	Cercotrichas galactotes	Least-concerned	Resident

=== Amphibians and reptiles ===
Name of animal	Scientific name
Indus valley toad	Duttaphrynus stomaticus
Skittering frog	Euphlyctis cyanophlyctis
Oriental garden lizard	Calotes versicolor
Agror agama	Laudakia agrorensis
Large-scaled agama	Laudakia nupta
Afghan ground agama	Trapelus megalonyx
Common leopard gecko	Eublepharis macularius
Reticulate plump-bodied gecko	Cyrtodactylus battalensis
Yellow-belly gecko	Hemidactylus flaviviridis
Persian Leaf-toed Gecko	Hemidactylus persicus
Indian fringe-fingered lizard	Acanthodactylus cantoris
Ribbon-sided skink	Eurylepis taeniolata
Indian spiny-tailed lizard	Saara hardwickii
Bengal monitor	Varanus bengalensis
Yellow monitor	Varanus flavescens
Russell's boa	Eryx conicus
Banded kukri snake	Oligodon arnensis
Streaked kukri snake	Oligodon taeniolatus
Indian rat snake	Ptyas mucosus
Diadem snake	Spalerosophis diadema
Common Krait	Bungarus caeruleus
Russell's viper	Daboia russelii
Saw-scaled viper	Echis carinatus
