= Rossie Priory =

Building in Perth and Kinross, Scotland

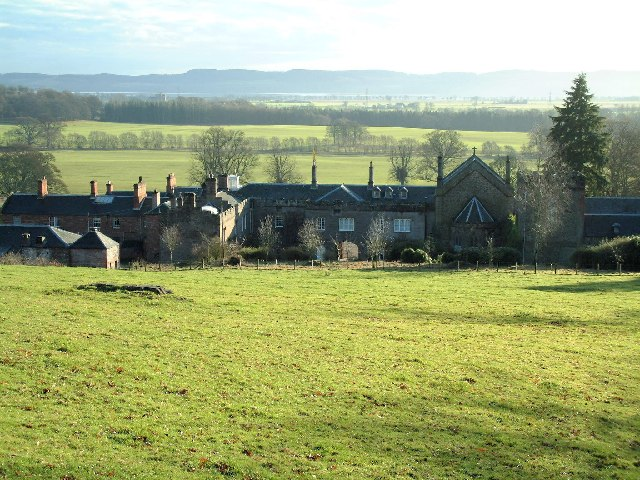
- Rossie Priory

- Location within Perth and Kinross

General information
- Architectural style: Regency Gothic

Inventory of Gardens and Designed Landscapes in Scotland
- Official name: Rossie Priory
- Designated: 30 June 1987
- Reference no.: GDL00331
- Location: Inchture, Perth and Kinross, Scotland, United Kingdom
- Coordinates: 56.462995°N 3.161932°W
- Completed: 1807

Rossie Priory is a category B listed country house and estate to the north of Inchture, near the hamlets of Baledgarno and Knapp, Perthshire, Scotland. It lies 9.6 miles (15.4 km) by road west of the city centre of Dundee. The large estate is roughly 2000 acres.

== Rossie Priory house ==
Rossie Priory was designed by the architect William Atkinson in Regency Gothic Style. It was designed as a house (1807) for Charles Kinnaird, 8th Lord Kinnaird as the seat of the Kinnaird family and replaced Drimmie House, which was subsequently demolished. The house was added to between 1839-40 and the chapel completed in 1865-66. A large portion of the house was demolished in 1948, as the vast building was deemed too impractical to maintain in the twentieth century, and alterations were carried out in 1949 by architect Sir Basil Spence. Plans of the demolished buildings in the Spence Archive show the significant reduction and that the foundations were to be covered with a terraced garden.

== Designed landscape ==
The designed landscape and gardens of Rossie Priory are considered to be "of outstanding value as a Work of Art" by Historic Environment Scotland. The designed landscape dates from around 1800-33 and was further developed between 1887 and the end of the twentieth century. The landscape includes parklands, woodlands and walled gardens. An arboretum was established in the 1860s and there are three main ornamental gardens: the Terrace, the Topiary and the Water gardens. Prior to 1800, there was a scheme of planting surrounding Drimmie House which can be seen on the Roy Military Survey map (1747-52).

== Notable monuments ==
Moncur Castle was the original fortified house on the Rossie estate and dates from the sixteenth century; its remains are a scheduled ancient monument. Rossie Priory Stone, a cross slab with Pictish symbols, is in Kinnaird Mausoleum (formerly Rossie Church) and also a scheduled monument of national importance. The market cross of the old village of Rossie dates from 1746 and is listed category A. It takes the form of a Corinthian column surmounted by two lions and two unicorns.

== Sporting and artistic connections ==
Rossie Priory Cricket Club is based on the estate and was founded in 1828 by George Kinnaird, 9th Lord Kinnaird; it is the second oldest Scottish cricket club still in existence after Kelso.

George Kinnaird also established an early calotype photographic studio with the assistance of Thomas Rodger in around 1850. The Rossie Priory Glass Plate Negative Collection is held by the University of St Andrews.

Arthur Kinnaird, 11th Lord Kinnaird was a leading football player, who played for Scotland, and served as the president of the Football Association.

== Sale of the estate ==
Rossie Priory House and 240 acres of the estate were put up for sale in August 2021. The estate has been the Kinnaird family seat since the twelfth century and the house has not been sold before.
