= George Kinnaird, 7th Lord Kinnaird =

Scottish aristocrat, virtuoso, peer and banker

George Kinnaird, 7th Lord Kinnaird (1754–1805) was a Scottish aristocrat, virtuoso, and banker. He was a Scottish representative peer in 1787.

== Life ==
He was the son of Charles Kinnaird, 6th Lord Kinnaird and Barbara Johnstone, daughter of Sir James Johnstone, bart. He succeeded his father in 1767, and entered Pembroke College, Cambridge in 1769, graduating M.A. in 1771.

Kinnaird was partner in the banking firm of Ransom, Morland and Hammersley of Pall Mall, London; the MP William Morland was one of the partners, as was Hugh Hammersley MP. Kinnaird fell out with the Prince of Wales, one of the bank's customers, who moved his business to Coutts & Co. He was also chairman of the London Fire Office.

With Morland, Kinnaird helped set up the Dundee New Bank in 1802. Henry Boase as managing partner of the Pall Mall bank went to Dundee to reconstruct it, in 1804.

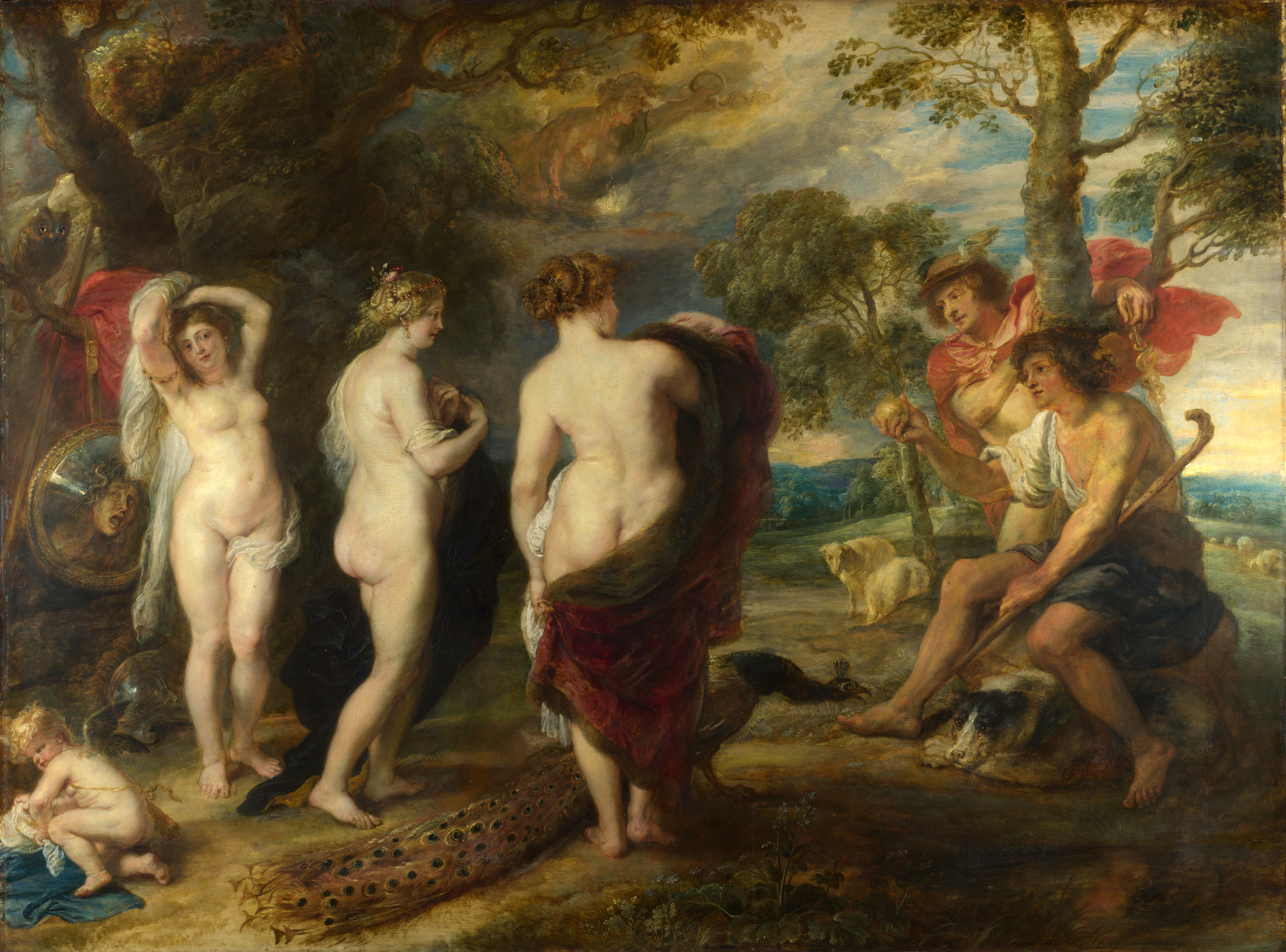
The Judgement of Paris, Peter Paul Rubens, c. 1636 (in the National Gallery, London from 1844), a work from the Orleans collection purchased by Lord Kinnaird in 1792, for 2000 guineas

Kinnaird was known as an art collector. The collection he founded was based on purchases from the Orleans Collection, dispersed in 1792, along with other works such as Parmigianino's Virgin and Child. The dealer Thomas Moore Slade imported Northern European works for Kinnaird, Hammersley and Morland. Kinnaird's collection was subsequently housed at, and named for, Rossie Priory; and was sold in 1948.

In politics Kinnaird acted as treasurer to the Society of the Friends of the People, which he joined in 1792 with James Maitland, 8th Earl of Lauderdale and David Erskine, 11th Earl of Buchan.

Kinnaird was elected a Fellow of the Royal Society in 1784. He died on 11 October 1805, in Perth.

== Family ==
Kinnaird married Elizabeth, daughter of Griffin Ransom. He was succeeded by their second son Charles. Their fifth son Douglas James William was an MP. The other sons and the daughters were:

- (1) George William Ransom, died 1779;
- (3) Henry, died 1784;
- (4) Edward Griffin, died 1803;
- (6) Frederick John Hay, died 1814;

and

- Eliza, married Edward Plunkett, 14th Baron Dunsany;
- Georgiana Mary Anne, married George Johnstone Hope;
- Laura Margaretta, died 1810;
- Amelia Barbara, died 1795.

== Notes ==
Peerage of Scotland
Preceded by Charles Kinnaird	Lord Kinnaird; 1767–1805	Succeeded by Charles Kinnaird
