= Harriett Urmston =

- Born: 20 January 1828; Clapham Common
- Died: 4 September 1897 (aged 69); Maidenhead
- Other name: "Holy Mary"
- Occupation: activist
- Known for: evangelising to soldiers and their wives
- Spouse: Henry Brabazon Urmston

Harriett Urmston born Harriett Elizabeth Hughes (20 January 1828 – 4 September 1897) was a British missionary in India who preached to the British wives and soldiers in Rawalpindi. She spent years talking in the UK in support of the Zenana Bible and Medical Missionary Society.

== Life ==
Urmston was born in Clapham Common in 1828, but she was brought up in Ryde on the Isle of Wight. This was her family's home as her father was a member of parliament in London. Her parents were Maria (born Field) and William Hughes Hughes. Her father had bought the house in Ryde after receiving an inheritance after which he styled himself with the name "Hughes Hughes". This was considered ludicrous and he caused some concern with his sharp practice that got him elected in Oxford.

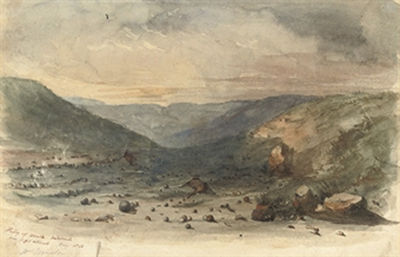
The Valley of Death, Balaclava, 1855 - Painting by her husband

Harriet sailed for India in 1850 in September. In November she married Henry Brabazon Urmston who had been working for the East India Company since 1847.

Her serious missionary work began when they began living in Rawalpindi. Her mission was not to the people of India, but initially to the wives of the soldiers. Her meetings attracted the husbands too and she was known as "Holy Mary". She would have services that consisted on hymns and a sermon based on scripture.

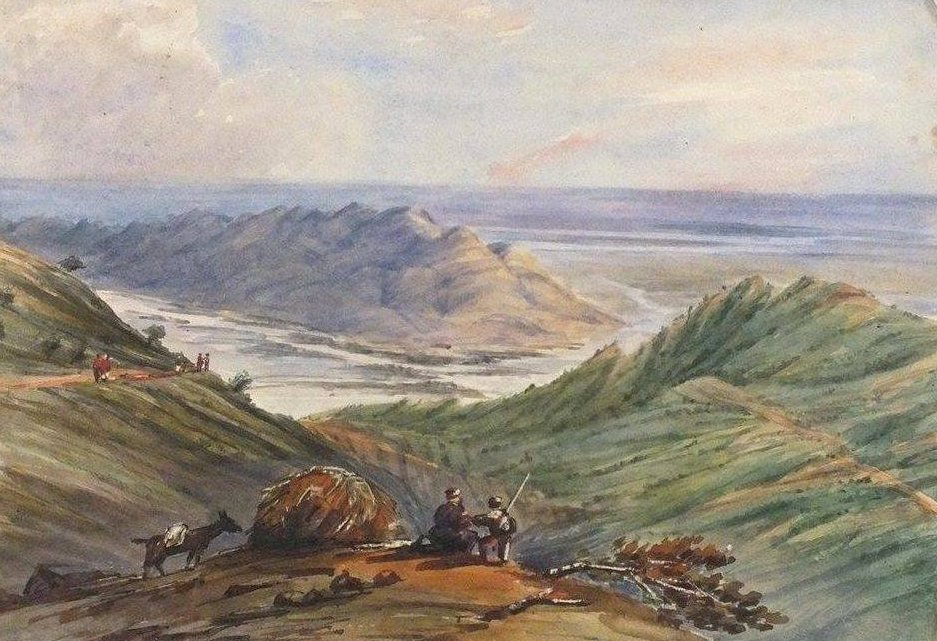
View of Sheikh Budeen from Picnic Hill (1864 in now Pakistan) by her husband

Ill health obliged the couple to return from India in 1875. This was their third return to the UK from India as they had been given two furloughs during their mission. They booked a package holiday with Thomas Cook & Son on their return and the family went on a £10 arranged holiday to Rome.

She still worked to support the missions and she encouraged support for the Zenana Bible and Medical Missionary Society. This mission was aimed at women in India who could not normally meet a male missionary. It would have been unusual to hear a woman preach in Britain at that time, but on her return she continued to preach. The Temperance advocate Frederick Charrington invited her to preach thirteen times in East London at the Assembly Hall, Mile End. Less formally she spoke in mission halls. She addressed over 32,000 people in 1877 by speaking 276 times at different events.

Urmston and her family moved to Maidenhead in 1885 where she was said ro visit eighty families. She died in 1897 of typhoid, she was survived by her husband. The following year her biography "The Starry Crown: a sketch of the life work of Harriett E. H. Urmston, etc" was published.

== Private life ==
Urmston and her husband had eight children and six of them outlived their mother; namely Henry Brabazon (1851–1888), Mary Grace (1853–1933), Herbert Edwardes (1855–1885), Gertrude Elizabeth (1858–1916), Arthur Brabazon (b. 1861), Robert Bruce Brabazon (b. 1862), Beatrice Brabazon (b. 1864), and Florence Macan (b. 1866).
