= Gertrude Kinnaird =

English philanthropist

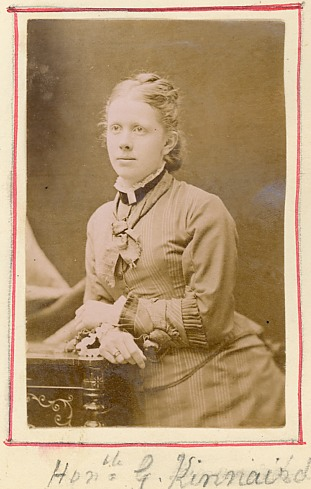
- Gertrude Kinnaird
- Born: Gertrude Mary Kinnaird; 1853
- Died: 1931 (aged 77–78); London, England
- Known for: YWCA leader, philanthropist

Gertrude Mary Kinnaird (1853–1931) was an English philanthropist and Christian missionary. She was a member of Youth Women's Christian Association (YWCA).

== Life ==
Gertrude Kinnaird was born in 1853 to the 11th Baron Arthur Fitzgerald Kinnaird and Mary Jane née Hoare, philanthropist and founder of Young Women's Christian Association (YWCA).

Kinnaird was a missionary and a member of YWCA. She had a keen interest in affairs concerned with India. Kinnaird had a reputation as an effective platform speaker. She spoke at meetings throughout India aising awareness about Christianity. She also spoke of the need for improved education and medical care among women in India.

Kinnaird participated in various educational and reformist projects such as the Indian Female Normal School and Instruction Society and the Zenana Bible and Medical Mission, precursors of the present-day international Christian organization Interserve.

Gertrude Kinnaird died in July 1931. Her funeral took place at the Golders Green Crematorium in London on 14 July 1931.
