= YMCA Indian Students' Union and Hostel =

Building in Fitzrovia, London, England

Coordinates: 51.5228°N 0.1390°W

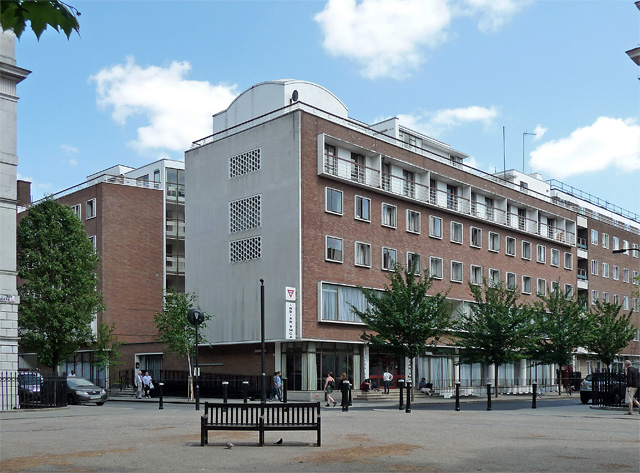
The hostel

The Indian Students' Union and Hostel is a YMCA hostel in Fitzroy Square, Fitzrovia, London. It was founded in 1920 by the Indian National Council of YMCAs to provide housing and social facilities for Indian students in London. Key individuals who assisted were Edwyn Bevan, Emily Kinnaird and K. T. Paul, and Laurence Binyon gave the inaugural address.

As of 2021, the building is still in use as a social and cultural center and hosts events for Diwali, Holi, and Christmas, among others.

== History ==
When the Indian YMCA was founded in 1920, it recognized the need for a social and cultural center for Indian students studying in London, and opened their first student hostel in Bloomsbury. In 1923 the hostel moved from 'Shakespeare Hut' to a new building on Gower Street. After that building was damaged in World War Two, the current building was built in Fitzroy Square. The foundation stone was laid by V.K. Krishna Menon, an Indian independence activist.

== Architecture ==
Ralph Tubbs designed the current building in the early 1950s. The building has been listed Grade II on the National Heritage List for England since March 1996.

It is built from reinforced concrete and Portland stone cladding. The distinctive roof includes a semi-domed prayer room and a flat for the warden. Internally, the building has a large diagonal staircase and a multi-level foyer. It is an example of Modernist architecture.
