= Ruth Frances Woodsmall =

American high school English teacher, YWCA member and author

- Born: September 20, 1883; Atlanta, Georgia, U.S.
- Died: May 25, 1963 (aged 79); New York City, New York, U.S.
- Occupations: Teacher; Author
- Known for: Activist for women's education issues

Ruth Frances Woodsmall (September 20, 1883 – May 25, 1963) was an American high school English teacher, YWCA member, and author. She served as Chief of the Women's Affairs Section of the Allied High Commission for Occupied Germany, worked for the United Nations Commission on the Status of Women, and was a member of UNESCO Working Party on the Equality of Access of Women to Education. Her publications include: Moslem Women Enter a New World (1936), and Eastern Women Today and Tomorrow (1933), Study of the Role of Women, Their Activities and Organizations in Lebanon, Egypt, Iraq, Jordan, and Syria (1955) and Women and the New East (1960).

== Early life ==
Woodsmall was born in Atlanta, Georgia on September 20, 1883, the youngest of three children of Harrison S. Woodsmall, a lawyer and teacher, and Mary Elizabeth Howes, an art teacher. She grew up in Indianapolis, Indiana and attended local schools. She received her A.B. from the University of Nebraska in 1905 and her A.M. from Wellesley College in 1906.

== Career ==
From 1906 to 1917 Woodsmall worked as a high school English teacher and principal in Nevada and Colorado. From 1917 to 1928 and 1932 to 1948, Woodsmall held various positions with the National and World YWCA. As a member of the National Board of the YWCA of the United States, she worked with the War Work Council directing Hostess Houses in the United States and France during World War I. From 1918 to 1920 she did post war work and field studies of the Baltic and Balkan countries. In 1920 Woodsmall became executive secretary of the Near and Middle East, a post she held until 1928.

In 1928 she received a traveling fellowship from the Rockefeller Foundation to conduct a study of the changing status of Moslem women in the Middle East. Her 1930 report was later published in 1936 as Moslem Women Enter a New World. In 1930 Woodsmall participated in the Laymen's Foreign Mission Inquiry, an independent ecumenical project of the Protestant churches to assess missionaries' record in converting non-western populations. Her Eastern Women Today and Tomorrow (1933) contained the results of this project. In 1932 Woodsmall returned to the YWCA as staff specialist for the National Board, and in 1935 she became General Secretary for the World YWCA, a post she held until 1947. Between 1947 and 1948 she did special service for the YWCA in Japan.

In 1949 Woodsmall became Chief of the Women's Affairs Section of the U.S. High Commission for Occupied Germany, a position she held until 1952. She was appointed by the Department of State to the United Nations Commission on the Status of Women for two sessions in 1949 and 1952. In 1951 she was a member of the UNESCO Working Party on the Equality of Access of Women to Education. In the years following her retirement she continued her research and writings, updating her earlier research in Study of the Role of Women, Their Activities and Organizations in Lebanon, Egypt, Iraq, Jordan, and Syria (1955) and Women and the New East (1960).

== Death ==
Woodsmall died in New York City on May 25, 1963.

== Influence on other authors ==
Woodsmall's work has been cited as source material by other authors, such as Samuel Hugh Moffett in A History of Christianity in Asia, and Laura E. Donaldson in Postcolonialism, Feminism and Religious Discourse. In American Christians and Islam, Thomas S. Kidd quoted Woodsmall's Muslem Women Enter a New World, in which she attributed the oppressed condition of Islamic women to a "spirit of fatalism". He also noted her hope that education would "bring religion in accord with modern needs."

Her work continued to be published after her death, with reprints of Moslem Women Enter A New World in 1975 and 2010, and Women in the changing Islamic system in 1983.

== Books ==
- Woodsmall, R., F. (1936). Moslem Women Enter A New World. London: George Allen & Unwin Ltd.
  - Alt: Woodsmall, R., F. (1936). Moslem Women Enter A New World. London: George Allen & Unwin Ltd.
- Woodsmall, R., F. (1936). Women In The Changing Islamic System. Dehli: Bimla.
  - Alt: Woodsmall, R., F. (1936). Women In The Changing Islamic System. Dehli: Bimla.
