= Emma Robarts =

British Christian activist

Emma Robarts (died 1 May 1877) was a British Christian activist who founded the Prayer Union, a group dedicated to women's fellowship and spiritual support. In 1877, shortly before her death, the Prayer Union merged with an organisation created by Mary Jane Kinnaird leading to the formation of the Young Women's Christian Association.

== History ==
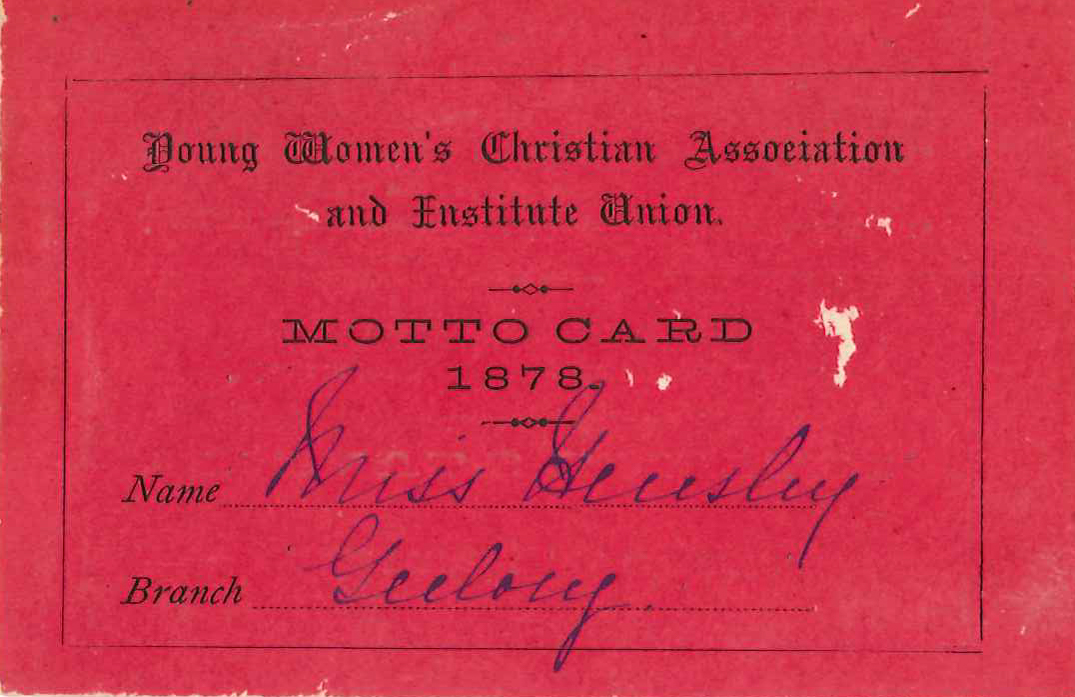
1878 YWCA Motto card - obverse

Robarts grew up in Barnet, Hertfordshire where she lived with four of her unmarried sisters and her father, Nathaniel Robarts, a London woollen draper.

In 1855, she decided to form a group that could pray for other women. The first group consisted of 23 Christian women who initially met in Middlesex. The idea of offering prayers was popular and within four years, there were similar groups being established all throughout the United Kingdom. Robarts intended to appeal to all classes of women in order that their combined prayers could provide for the "eternal salvation" of other young women. The group had initially called themselves the "Young Women's Christian Association" echoing the YMCA which had been formed in 1844 and eventually settled on the name of the "Prayer Union" in 1855. By 1872, there were 130 branches in Britain supplying Bible study, group prayer and social events with some even offering lodging.

Robarts met Mary Jane Kinnaird who had also created an organisation in 1855 initially to provide accommodation for nurses travelling to and from the Crimean War but which later widened its base to provide housing for Christian women. They merged both organisations to form what would become known as the Young Women's Christian Association. The founding date of the YWCA has been given as 1876 or 1877. Kinnaird and Robarts had met in 1876 and an agreement was made in January 1877. Robarts died on 1 May 1877, before the merger was announced at the end of the year that created "The London Young Women's Institute Union and Christian Association".
