= Ralph Tubbs =

Living in Cities, by Ralph Tubbs, Penguin, London, 1942

Ralph Sydney Tubbs OBE FRIBA (9 January 1912 – 24 November 1996) was a British architect. Well known amongst the buildings he designed was the Dome of Discovery at the successful Festival of Britain on the South Bank in London in 1951.

== Background ==
Ralph Sydney Tubbs was born in Hadley Wood, Hertfordshire, in 1912. He was educated at Mill Hill School and then the Architectural Association, which is highly regarded in Modern architecture and engineering.

== Career ==
In 1935, Tubbs began working for Ernő Goldfinger, participating in the design of Goldfinger's house on 2 Willow Road. In 1940 he designed the Living in Cities exhibition for the British Institute of Adult Education and the Council for Encouragement of Music and Arts, for which he made in 1942 a small book as well. During the World War II, Tubbs was not in services for medical reason, and worked as firewatcher.

Buildings designed by Tubbs include (dates shown for design to building)

- 1935–1938 only working drawings for 2 Willow Road, Hampstead, London (designed by Erno Goldfinger)
- 1948–1951 Dome of Discovery, South Bank, London
- 1952–1953 YMCA Indian Student Hostel, Fitzrovia, London
- 1956–1961 Baden-Powell House, Kensington, London
- 1960 Granada House, Manchester
- 1959-1973 Charing Cross Hospital, Hammersmith, London (constructed 1969–73)

Ralph Tubbs's Dome of Discovery project was given tribute at the Millennium Dome. In 1951, The Dome of Discovery was not only the largest diameter dome in the world, 365 feet across, but was totally unsupported except around the perimeter.

== Personal life ==
In 1946, Tubbs married Mary Taberner. They were longtime residents of Wimbledon Village, and had two sons and a daughter.

On 24 November 1996, Tubbs died from complications of sepsis and subacute bacterial endocarditis at St George's Hospital in London, aged 84.

== Publications ==
- Tubbs, Ralph (1942). Living in Cities. Penguin.
- Tubbs, Ralph (1945). The Englishman Builds.
