= Lilace Reid Barnes =

Lilace Reid Barnes, 1929

Lilace Reid Barnes (January 12, 1899 – February 3, 1989) was the eleventh president of the Young Women's Christian Association and its first American World President from 1947 to 1955.

== Career ==
Lilace began volunteering with the Young Women's Christian Association as a secretary in 1926. By 1929, she was chairing a committee to arrange a special service in recognition of the leadership of women at a regional YWCA convention including guests such as Jane Addams and Edith Mason. She was a member of the Chicago YWCA's metropolitan board of directors from 1933 to 1936 and chaired the finance and service bureau committees. In 1936, she was elected to be a director of the Woman's City Club's citizens' committee to supervise the examination for 25 policewomen to be added to the Chicago police force. In December the same year Lilace was elected president of the YWCA in Chicago. In 1937, she served on the board of Cook County's Women's Field Army education campaign against cancer. In 1944 she became the first woman to serve as a session member of the First Presbyterian Church of Lake Forest. In 1945-1946 she was a delegate to the international YWCA executive committee meeting and served as foreign field advisory secretary.

Lilace was the YWCA's first American World President from 1947 to 1955, serving in Geneva, Switzerland. In 1954 she was selected as project chairman of a new YWCA program in international relations funded by a Ford Foundation grant. Upon her return to the United States, she became head of the YWCA National Board from 1955 until 1961. She became a Trustee of the YWCA Retirement Fund in 1962.

In the 1950s and 1960s she spoke in support of the Civil Rights Movement; in November 1956, Lilace was a speaker at The Interracial Conference of the National Council of Negro Women. In 1960 she spoke at the YWCA's fall conference on "Creating a Climate of Integrity," praising young Black Americans in the south for "their faith in their country and in the dignity of the individual, their courage and self-discipline, which allows them to bear indignities and prison terms in their peaceful fight for the rights of all men." In Summer 1964, she served on the New York/Ruleville Team of Wednesdays in Mississippi (WIMS), sponsored by the National Council of Negro Women. From 1963-1966, Barnes was chair of the National Commission to study the YWCA as an inclusive Christian movement; she reported on the Commission's work at the YWCA Conference for the Southern Region on April 14, 1966. In 1968, she fund-raised for the initiative of Black students at Lake Forest College, "Soul Week," to bring Black "artists, musicians, writers, and scholars" to the campus.

== Legacy ==
Lilace Reid Barnes at Glen Rowan, 1950s

Lilace died on February 3, 1989. Mourners were encouraged to donate to the Lilace Reid Barnes Memorial Fund for the Work of the World YWCA.

During her life, Lilace was a financial supporter of Lake Forest College. In 1940, she and her father Clifford W. Barnes funded the redecoration of the College's Chapel which had been donated by her maternal grandparents in 1899. In 1944, she became the first woman appointed to the Lake Forest College Board of Trustees; a role which she served until 1962. In 1946 she donated her late father's private library of religious works to the Lake Forest College Library. In the 1960s she established the YWCA Lilace Reid Barnes Scholarship for international students. During her life, she hosted many College guests and receptions at her Lake Forest home, Glen Rowan. In Summer 1966 she hosted a visit by Martin Luther King, Jr. as part of her support for the Chicago open housing movement. In 1968 the house (designed by Howard Van Doren Shaw in 1908) was acquired by the Board of Trustees and became officially part of the College campus. In 1988, the College named their Interfaith Center for her.

She also served on the Board of Trustees of Provident Hospital in Chicago, the Lake Forest Symphony, and Shimer College.
