= Arthur Kinnaird, 10th Lord Kinnaird =

Scottish banker and Liberal politician

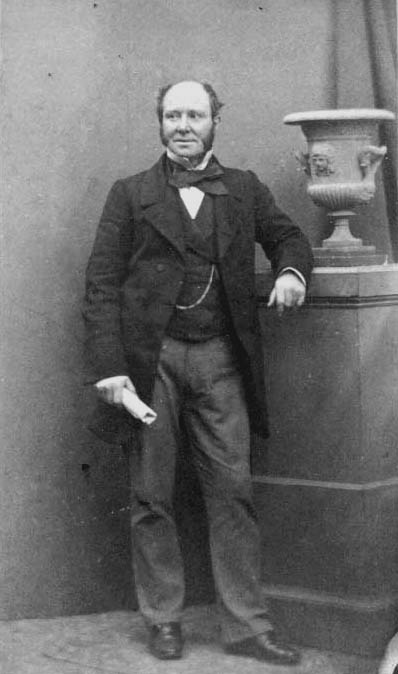
Kinnaird c. 1861-63

Arthur FitzGerald Kinnaird, 10th Lord Kinnaird (8 July 1814 – 26 April 1887), was a Scottish banker and Liberal politician.

== Early life and interests ==
Kinnaird was a younger son of Charles Kinnaird, 8th Lord Kinnaird, and Lady Olivia Letitia Catherine, daughter of William FitzGerald, 2nd Duke of Leinster.

He rose to become managing partner of Ransom, Bouverie & Co., a banking firm. He continued in this role once he was elected to Parliament. In 1868, he was elected as President of the National Bible Society of Scotland after the resignation of George Campbell, 8th Duke of Argyll.

He was a keen farmer and, in 1862, installed Victorian Turkish baths for cattle at his Millhill Farm at Inchture, raising the temperature higher than usual, and successfully using it in the treatment of distemper.

== Political career ==
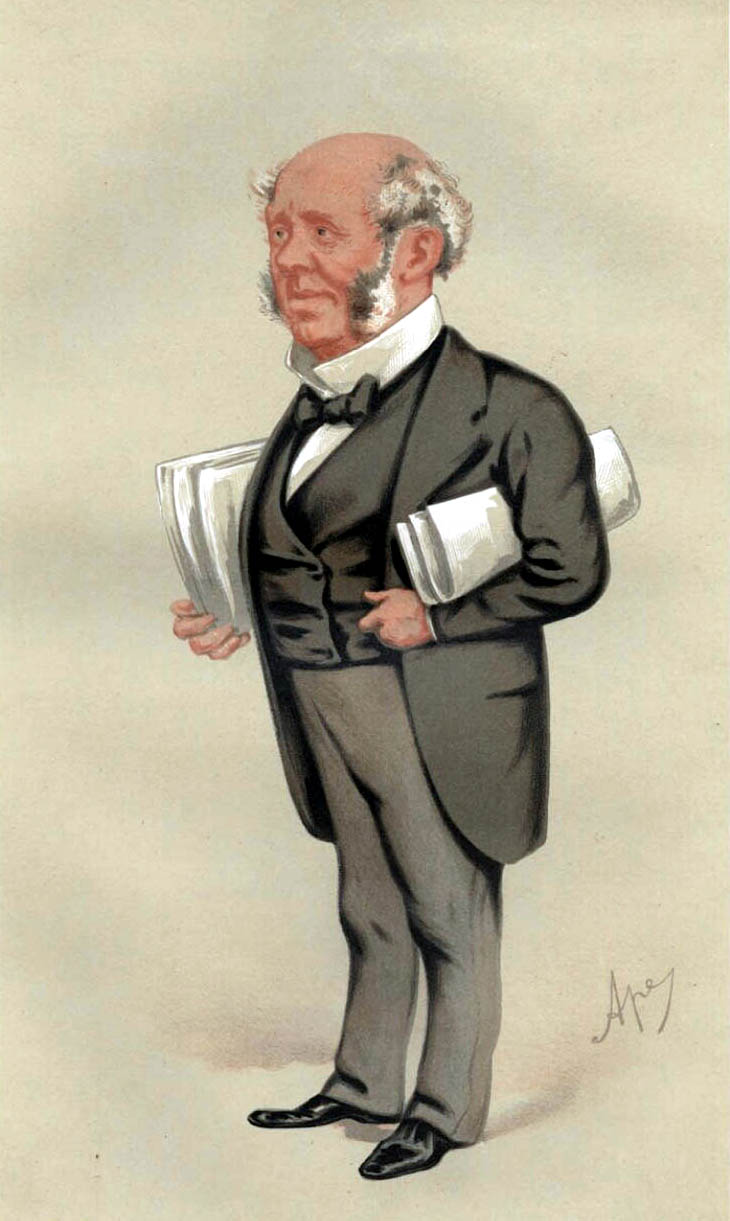
"Piety and Banking". Caricature by Ape published in Vanity Fair in 1876

Kinnaird sat as Member of Parliament for Perth from 1837 to 1839 and again from 1852 to 1878 for the Whigs. He was an avid supporter of Prime Minister Henry John Temple, 3rd Viscount Palmerston, which led to him being nicknamed "Palmerston's shadow". During his time in office, he was known for his desire to seek more representation for Scotland within Parliament. In 1878 he succeeded his elder brother in the Scottish lordship as well as in the barony of Kinnaird, and took his seat in the House of Lords.

Lord Kinnaird married Mary Jane (Hoare) Kinnaird (1816–1888), daughter of William Henry Hoare, in 1843. They had seven children out of whom six grew to adulthood: Frederica Georgina (1845–1929), Arthur Fitzgerald (1847–1923), Louisa Elizabeth (1848–1926), Agneta Olivia (1850–1940), Gertrude Mary (1853–1931), and Emily Cecilia (1855–1947). They settled in London and every Wednesday they would invite discussion on philanthropic projects. They raised funds for the Lock Hospital and Asylum which she and her husband supported. He was a strong supporter of women's suffrage, but his wife felt that this was not in keeping with her idea of a woman's role. She did not speak in public but it is speculated that she wrote his speeches.

In 1847, Kinnaird represented the British Association for the Relief of Distress in Ireland and the Highlands of Scotland, in distributing relief to the Scottish poor. He was treasurer of the Highland Emigration Fund

In 1856 he and their five children went to live above the bank where he worked in Pall Mall East. This new home became another centre for good works.

Lord Kinnaird died in April 1887, aged 72, and was succeeded by his eldest son, Arthur Fitzgerald. Lady Kinnaird died the following year.

== See also ==
- Lord Kinnaird

Parliament of the United Kingdom
Preceded by Laurence Oliphant	Member of Parliament for Perth; 1837–1839	Succeeded by David Greig
Preceded by Hon. Fox Maule	Member of Parliament for Perth; 1852–1878	Succeeded by Charles Stuart Parker
Peerage of Scotland
Preceded by George Kinnaird	Lord Kinnaird; 1878–1887	Succeeded by Arthur Kinnaird
Peerage of the United Kingdom
Preceded by George Kinnaird	Baron Kinnaird; 1878–1887	Succeeded by Arthur Kinnaird
