= Knapp, Perthshire =

Coordinates: 56.47018°N 3.162152°W

Knapp: Scottish Gaelic: An Cnap
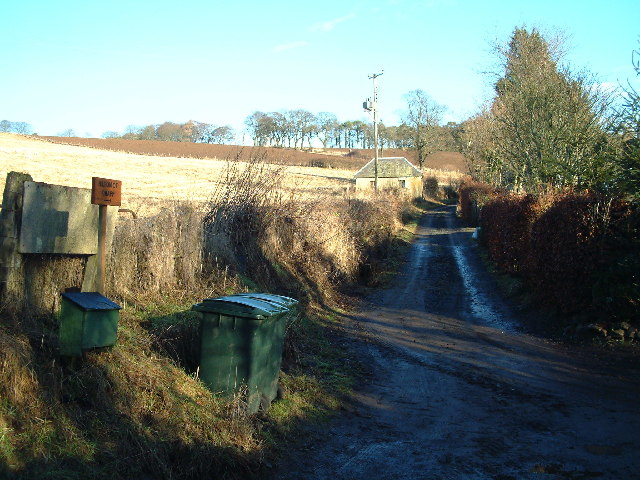

- Location within Perth and Kinross
- Council area: Perth and Kinross
- Lieutenancy area: Perth and Kinross
- Country: Scotland
- Sovereign state: United Kingdom
- Post town: PERTH
- Postcode district: PH
- Police: Scotland
- Fire: Scottish
- Ambulance: Scottish

Knapp is a hamlet in Perth and Kinross, Scotland. It is located to the northeast of Inchture, about 9.7 miles (15.6 km) by road west of the city centre of Dundee, 47m above sea level, and is covered by the OS Explorer map 380: Dundee & Sidlaw Hills.

The Rossie Priory, an extensive country estate owned by the Kinnaird family is just to the southwest. Knapp contains an old coaching house (now converted into a property), converted Old Smiddy, Old Mill, Doocot, and many other lovely old properties, and its pièce de résistance is a functional red telephone box.
