= Mary Jane Kinnaird =

English philanthropist (1816–1888)

Mary Kinnaird
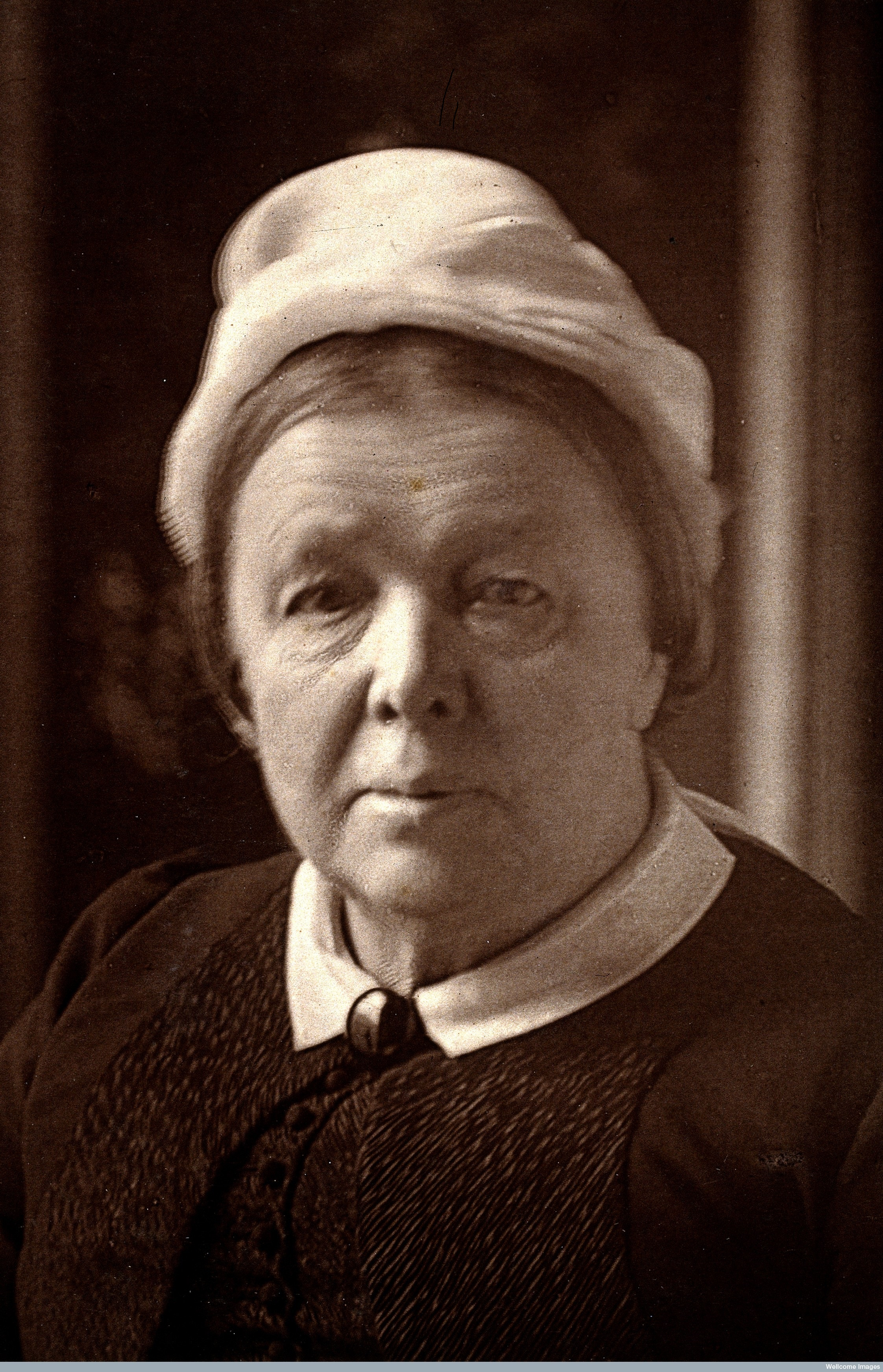
- Lady Kinnaird
- Born: Mary Jane Hoare; 1816; Northamptonshire, England
- Died: 1888 (aged 71–72)
- Known for: founding YWCA
- Spouse: Arthur Kinnaird, 10th Lord Kinnaird

Mary Jane Kinnaird, Lady Kinnaird (born Hoare; 1816–1888) was an English philanthropist and co-founder of the Young Women's Christian Association. Kinnaird has one Women's College and a girls' High School in Pakistan and at least one school and hospital in India named after her.

== Life ==
Kinnaird was born Mary Jane Hoare in 1816 at Blatherwick Park in Northamptonshire. Her parents William Henry and Louisa Elizabeth died in 1819 and 1816 respectively leaving her an orphan whilst still a child. She lived with her paternal grandfather Henry Hoare of Mitcham Grove until he died in 1828, when her elder brother Henry Hoare (1807–1866) became her legal guardian. Her day-to-day care was left to aunts and uncles and a governess. She was inspired by reading the evangelist William Romaine's works to Bible study, daily prayers and evangelism. In 1837 she became her uncle's de facto secretary. He was the Honourable and Reverend Baptist Wriothesley Noel who was based at St John's Chapel in Bedford Row in London. She established her own projects and formed St John's Training School for Domestic Servants in 1841. Another pet project was to help fund a Calvin memorial hall in Geneva. She and the Reverend Noel wanted to encourage the spread of European Protestantism and she was visited several times by both the Swiss minister Jean-Henri Merle d'Aubigné and the French minister Frédéric Monod.

== Driving force ==
Her work was empowered when she married in 1843 Arthur Kinnaird, 10th Lord Kinnaird, who was the Lord Kinnaird of Inchture, and the second Baron Kinnaird of Rossie from that year. They settled in London and every Wednesday they would invite discussion on philanthropic projects. She was shy and did not undertake public speaking, but she was the driving force. Her own personal project was to raise money by crowd-sourcing a book of prayers. The funds raised were for the Lock Hospital and Asylum, which she and her husband supported. Her husband was a strong supporter of women's suffrage, but she felt that this was not in keeping with her idea of a woman's role. She did not speak in public, but it is thought that she wrote her husband's speeches.

Kinnaird worked with Florence Nightingale to train nurses for the Crimean War. As part of this work, she created the North London Home where women could stay. The home had its own library. In the same year, as she gave birth to the youngest of her children, Emily.

== Schools in Pakistan ==
In 1856 she and her five children went to live above the bank where her husband worked in Pall Mall East. This new home became another centre for good works. Her driving passion was India and she formed the Indian Female Normal School and Instruction Society, which created over sixty schools in India and it was said to visit over 1,300 zenanas. In about 1907 a school in Lahore, Pakistan changed its name to the Kinnaird Christian Girls' High School to recognise her contribution. The school went on to become Kinnaird College for Women University.

== YWCA ==
Kinnaird built on her work in establishing the North London Home to found the United Association for the Christian and Domestic Improvement of Young Women, which by 1871 had four institutes and two homes. Wanting to expand this project in 1878, she decided to combine it with the Prayer Union, a Bible study group created by Emma Robarts. Robarts died, but the organisation went on to become the Young Women's Christian Association.

Kinnaird was also one of the founders of the Women's Emigration Society, which arranged for women to obtain good jobs and to travel to the colonies. The YWCA would help to support these emigrants.

In 1884 the YWCA was restructured – up to that point, London had almost a separate organisation, but there was now just one national YWCA organisation. Beneath this there was different presidents and staff for London, England and Wales, Scotland, Ireland, "Foreign", and Colonial and Missionary. This organisation was involved in distributing Christian texts and literature, but it also interviewed young women in an effort to improve living conditions. In 1884 they were working amongst Scottish fisherwomen, publishing their own magazine and operating a ladies' restaurant in London. This work was launched during talk of White Slavery, where women were said to be kidnapped into prostitution. In 1886 the British government raised the age of consent from thirteen to sixteen.

== Children ==
In 1887, Kinnaird was widowed, and her son Arthur became the 11th Lord Kinnaird. She died in 1888, survived by Arthur and Frederica Georgina (1845–1929), Louisa Elizabeth (1848–1926), Agneta Olivia (1850–1940), Gertrude Mary (1853–1931) and Emily Cecilia Kinnaird. Frederica and Agneta both married, but the three unmarried daughters, Louisa, Gertrude and Emily, continued their mother's good works. Louisa was active in London but both Gertrude and particularly Emily were missionaries.
