= David Greig (MP) =

David Greig (born 1793) was a Scottish politician.

Born in Perth, David was the son of Bailie James Greig. He worked as a watchmaker and jeweller. He was also involved with shipping in the burgh's port. He stood in the 1839 Perth by-election for the Whigs, winning the seat, but he did not stand at the subsequent 1841 UK general election. During the same period, he served as Provost of Perth. He later became a director of the Scottish Provincial Assurance Company.

Parliament of the United Kingdom
Preceded by Arthur Kinnaird	Member of Parliament for Perth; 1839–1841	Succeeded by Fox Maule
