= Thomas Moore Slade =

Thomas Moore Slade (born 1751) was an English art dealer and collector.

== Life ==
He was the son of Thomas Slade who died in 1771. Inheriting a fortune, he set off on a Grand Tour in 1774.

In Sicily Slade visited Ignazio Paternò Castello with a letter of introduction from Sir William Hamilton. In Venice he made significant art purchases from the estate of the collector Bartolomeo Vitturi (1719–1776), with John Udny. Udny had difficulty meeting his share of the price, so Slade made a financial arrangement meaning that the whole collection came to him. He also bought prints and drawings from Giacomo Durazzo, and further paintings to sell on in Ferrara. Slade spent three years in Venice, and while there commissioned the 1775 Francesco Guardi Bird’s Eye View painting of the city.

Initially, Slade displayed his collections in his house at Rochester, Kent. He later lost all he had in speculation. He took a position working for the Victualling Office at Chatham.

In the period after the French Revolution, Slade bought the paintings by Flemish, Dutch and German artists from the Orleans Collection, in 1792. There were 147 pictures involved, and Slade was acting on behalf of a syndicate. These associates were connected to the London bank Ransom, Morland & Hammersley, founded in 1786: William Morland, Thomas Hammersley and George Kinnaird, 7th Lord Kinnaird. The following year, Slade put the paintings up for sale in London.

Slade was a dealer based in Bond Street in 1801, and a sales catalogue shows he stocked paintings by the English artists Joshua Reynolds, John Rathbone and James Thornhill, as well as many foreign masters. He lost all he had in speculation; he suffered bankruptcy in 1803.
