= George Kinnaird, 9th Lord Kinnaird =

Scottish Whig politician

The Right Honourable The Lord Kinnaird KT PC
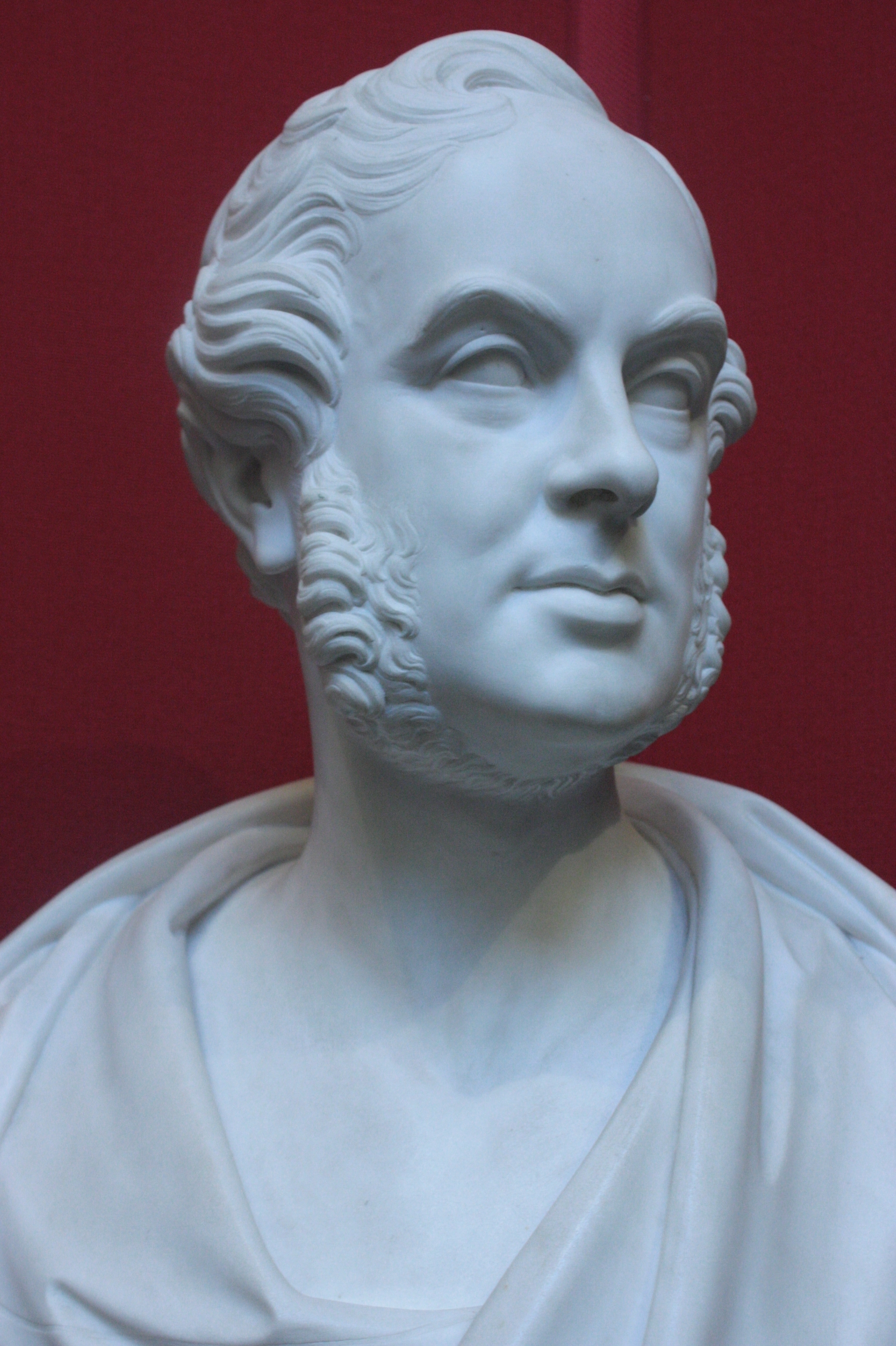
- The Lord Kinnaird by William Brodie 1859, NGS.

Master of the Buckhounds
- In office 21 December 1839 – 30 August 1841
- Monarch: Victoria
- Prime Minister: The Viscount Melbourne
- Preceded by: The Earl of Erroll
- Succeeded by: The Earl of Rosslyn

Personal details
- Born: 14 April 1807
- Died: 7 January 1878 (aged 70)
- Party: Whig
- Spouse: Hon. Frances Anne Georgina Ponsonby (1817–1910)

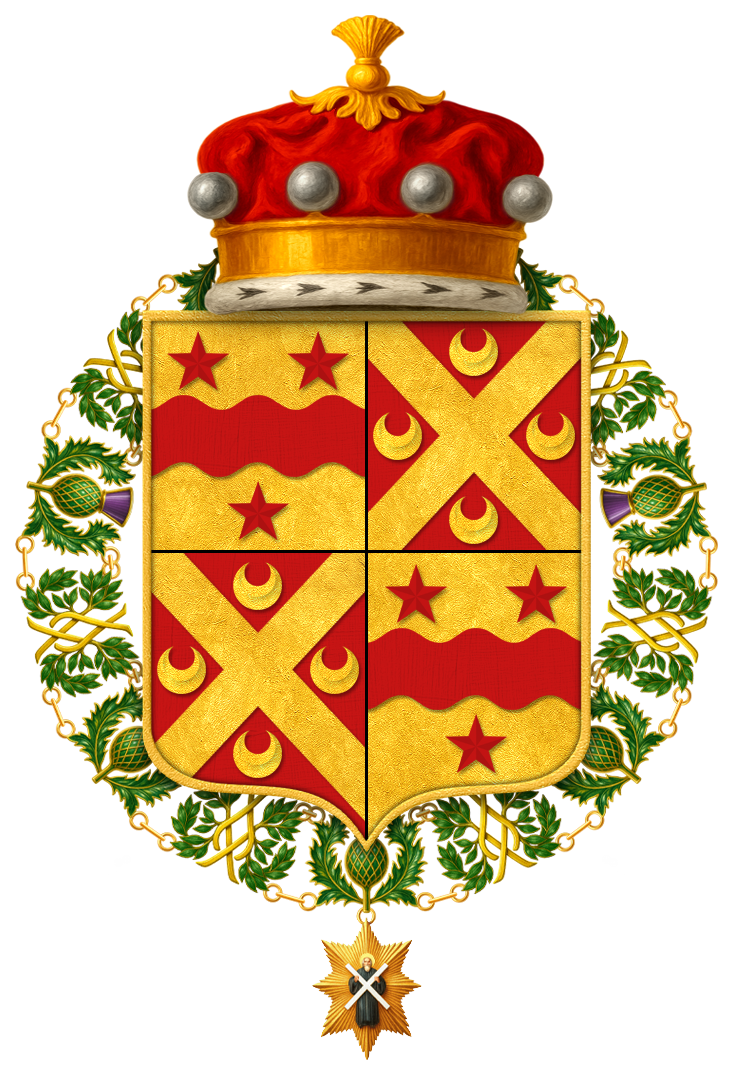
Shield of Arms of George William Fox Kinnaird, 9th Lord Kinnaird, KT, PC

George William Fox Kinnaird, 9th Lord Kinnaird, KT, PC (14 April 1807 – 7 January 1878) was a Scottish Whig politician. He served as Master of the Buckhounds under Lord Melbourne from 1839 to 1841.

== Background ==
Kinnaird was the eldest son of Charles Kinnaird, 8th Lord Kinnaird, by Lady Olivia Laetitia Catherine FitzGerald third daughter of William FitzGerald, 2nd Duke of Leinster.

== Political career ==
Kinnaird succeeded his father in the lordship of Kinnaird in 1826. This was a Scottish peerage and did not entitle him to an automatic seat in the House of Lords. However, in 1831 he was created Baron Rossie, of Rossie Priory in the County of Perth, in the Peerage of the United Kingdom, which gave him a seat in the upper chamber of Parliament. In December 1839 he was appointed Master of the Buckhounds under Lord Melbourne, a post he held until the government fell in 1841. He was sworn of the Privy Council in early 1840. In 1857 he was made a Knight of the Thistle. Three years later he was created Baron Kinnaird, of Rossie in the County of Perth, also in the Peerage of the United Kingdom. In contrast to the earlier barony, which was created with normal remainder to heirs male, this barony was created with special remainder to his younger brother, Arthur. Kinnaird later served as Lord Lieutenant of Perthshire from 1866 to 1878.

== Family ==
Lord Kinnaird married the Honourable Frances Anne Georgina Ponsonby, only daughter of William Ponsonby, 1st Baron de Mauley, at Great Canford, Dorset, on 14 December 1837. They had three children:

- Hon. Olivia Barbara Kinnaird (died 1871).
- Victor Alexander Kinnaird, Master of Kinnaird (1840–1851).
- Charles Fox Kinnaird, Master of Kinnaird (1841–1860).

Lord Kinnaird died in January 1878, aged 70, without surviving male issue. The barony of Rossie became extinct on his death while he was succeeded in the Scottish lordship and barony of Kinnaird by his younger brother, Arthur. Lady Kinnaird died in March 1910, aged 92.

Political offices
Preceded by The Earl of Erroll	Master of the Buckhounds; 1839–1841	Succeeded by The Earl of Rosslyn
Honorary titles
Preceded by The Earl of Kinnoull	Lord Lieutenant of Perthshire; 1866–1878	Succeeded by The Duke of Atholl
Masonic offices
Preceded by Lord Elcho	Grand Master of the Grand Lodge of Scotland; 1830–1832	Succeeded by The Earl of Buchan
Peerage of Scotland
Preceded by Charles Kinnaird	Lord Kinnaird; 1826–1878	Succeeded by Arthur Kinnaird
Peerage of the United Kingdom
New creation	Baron Rossie; 1831–1878	Extinct
New creation	Baron Kinnaird; 1860–1878	Succeeded by Arthur Kinnaird
