= International Service Fellowship =

Christian organization

The International Service Fellowship, more commonly known as Interserve, is an interdenominational Protestant Christian charity which was founded in London in 1852. For many years it was known as the Zenana Bible and Medical Missionary Society and it was run entirely by women.

== History ==
A. R. Cavalier In Northern India; a story of mission work in zenanas, hospitals, schools and villages; 1899

Interserve was originally called the Calcutta Normal School and later the Indian Female Normal School and Instruction Society and then the Zenana Bible and Medical Mission. It was founded as one of the zenana missions in the 19th century, with the aim of addressing the medical and educational needs of Indian women.

In 1821, Mary Ann Cooke (soon to be Wilson) landed in Calcutta with the intention of setting up a school to educate young Hindu women. Although she experienced significant opposition from people unwilling to countenance the thought of women receiving an education, she worked closely with the Church Mission Society to set up a school to teach girls. In 1852 Mrs Mackenzie, a colleague of Miss Cooke’s, wrote to the social activist Mary Jane Kinnaird (who later founded the YWCA) to ask for her assistance in expanding the organisation’s work. Lady Kinnaird’s involvement led to the rapid growth of the organisation and its expansion across India. Fund raising in Britain was led by enthusiasts such as Harriett Urmston who began her support in 1875. In 1880 internal disputes within the organisation resulted in the Church of England Zenana Mission breaking away.

From 1880 the organisation became known as the Zenana Bible and Medical Mission as its focus expanded to include medical work. In 1881 a Zenana worker, Miss Bielby, met Queen Victoria at Windsor Castle to ask for her support in publicising the organisation’s work, a request to which the Queen agreed. At this time the organisation began to expand its sending bases as well, and workers were sent from Canada, New Zealand, Ireland and the USA as well as from Britain.

For the first century of its existence the organisation was run solely by women but in 1957 the decision was made to accept men as well. In 1987 the organisation was renamed “Interserve” to reflect its international status and its emphasis on practical service.

== Today ==
Interserve sends out over 800 workers from countries including Britain, Australia, New Zealand, Canada, the USA, the Netherlands, Korea, Malaysia, Singapore, South Africa, Ireland, Germany, Switzerland, and India.

Interserve workers use their practical skills to serve the people they live amongst, in line with the instructions of Christ given in the Great Commission. Interserve, as an interdenominational agency, receives support from no specific Christian denomination in particular.
