= Bill Knapp's =

American restaurant chain

- Type: Private
- Industry: Casual dining restaurant
- Founded: 1948
- Defunct: 2002
- Headquarters: Battle Creek, Michigan, USA
- Key people: Clinton B. Knapp, Founder
- Website: www.billknapps.com

Bill Knapp's was an American family restaurant chain. It was founded by Clinton B. Knapp (March 13, 1907 – October 15, 1974), in Battle Creek, Michigan, in 1948. The chain operated in Michigan, Ohio, Florida, Illinois and Indiana, with more than 60 locations at its peak.

== The menu ==
Bill Knapp's featured a menu primarily filled with typical family dining items. The menu included a limited breakfast, sandwiches, baskets, and luncheon and dinner plates. A children's menu, featuring meals named for animals, was also offered. Recipes for their fried chicken, bean soup, ham croquettes, vegetable soup, onion rings, au gratin potatoes, and chocolate cakes (later purchased by Awrey Bakeries) were also featured. Locations replenished inventory on a daily basis from the commissary in Battle Creek, Mich., with their own fleet of trucks. Bill Knapp placed great emphasis on the quality and freshness of the food, with added emphasis on preparing the food "from scratch."

== Birthday and anniversary discounts ==
Bill Knapp's was well known for its birthday and anniversary discounts. Diners visiting Bill Knapp's on their birthdays were entitled to a percentage off of their bill based on their age. Thus, a guest 62 years old would receive a 62% discount. Those celebrating a wedding anniversary were treated to a whole chocolate cake to take home, and in some restaurants, managers gave birthday patrons a cake to take home in addition to their discount. While the cake was being presented, Bing Crosby's recording of "Happy Birthday" and "The Anniversary Song" would be played over the restaurant's sound system for birthdays and anniversaries. It was widely said that anyone over 100 would actually be paid by the restaurant (such as a 101% discount on a 101st birthday), and a man who ate at the West Lansing location for his 101st birthday received a free meal, and a check for 1% of his bill—7 cents.

== Demographics ==
Bill Knapp "was interested in providing decent food for a reasonable price with friendly service." The target clientele of his restaurants was families, often three generations eating together at long tables pushed together. As the decades passed, the clientele remained nearly the same as it had when the first restaurant of the chain opened in 1948. By the 1980s and 1990s, with the breakdown of extended families, the clientele was predominantly senior citizens.

In 1998, after its sale to an entrepreneur from California, Bill Knapp's instituted a "That was then, this is WOW" marketing campaign, as well as an overall revamp of the chain's image. The new ownership hung colorful shower curtains between eating booths, played rock and roll music (often loudly) throughout the dining areas, revised old building exteriors with newer, hipper color schemes, and further changes, including the installation of televisions and video games in restaurants.

The "That was then, this is WOW" campaign not only changed the interior and exterior décor, but the menu as well. Prior to 1996, Bill Knapp's cuisine was prepared, home style, in a commissary which supplied all of its restaurants daily or every other day. In an effort to cut costs, the commissary model was abandoned in favor of purchasing food from food services local to each restaurant, as well as substituting Lipton soups and Kraft macaroni and cheese for the previously home-made versions provided by the commissary.

== Downfall ==
This overhaul of the chain's demographics, however, proved unsuccessful. Loyal diners felt alienated by the changes made; abandonment of Mr. Knapp's "from-scratch" philosophy drove these loyal customers away for good. Furthermore, the campaign failed to recruit the younger-family crowd, resulting in further erosion of the chain's customer base.

Another reason for the shift away from the made-from-scratch philosophy was a Listeria outbreak in the early 1990s. As the restaurant struggled to recover from the negative publicity, many new, updated food safety standards were initiated. Some food preparation that was taking place in the restaurants had to be moved back to the commissaries, to be monitored more closely. This was not as cost effective, as more foods needed to be processed and frozen to ensure safety. As commissary costs continued to rise, more of Bill Knapp's signature foods had to be outsourced to larger processing facilities.

By 2000, the commissaries were becoming little more than distribution centers. Fresh, handmade hamburger patties were replaced by frozen, eggs by a powdered substitute, and even the marinated chicken breasts were coming in frozen packages. (Raw chicken breasts had been marinated overnight in the restaurants.) While the organization elevated food safety standards, higher costs combined with lower quality led the chain to its ultimate downfall.

In 2001, Bill Knapp's tried to reverse course by announcing that "The Tradition is Back," restoring the original menu and some original décor, but by then it was too late.

On Tuesday May 21, 2002, Bill Knapp's filed for voluntary Chapter 11 protection in U.S. Bankruptcy Court for the Western District of Michigan. At the time the company operated 29 restaurants.

By the end of 2002, the chain's last restaurant had closed.

A company controlled by Awrey's heir Marty Carrier acquired the rights to the Bill Knapp's name and dessert recipes in 2005 and began marketing Bill Knapp's bakery products in grocery stores as well as an outlet store in Saline, Michigan, which opened in 2019.
