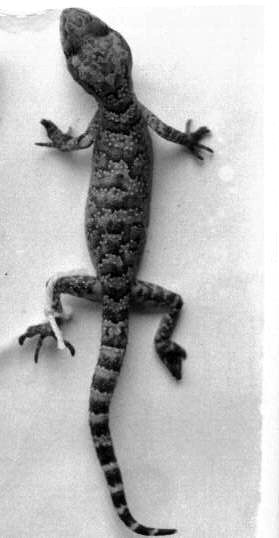

Scientific classification
- Kingdom: Animalia
- Phylum: Chordata
- Class: Reptilia
- Order: Squamata
- Suborder: Gekkota
- Family: Gekkonidae
- Genus: Cyrtodactylus
- Species: C. battalensis

Binomial name
- Cyrtodactylus battalensis (Khan, 1993)

Synonyms
- Cyrtopodion battalensis; Cyrtopodion battalense; Siwaligekko battalensis; Tenuidactylus battalensis

= Reticulate plump-bodied gecko =

Species of lizard

The reticulate plump-bodied gecko (Cyrtodactylus battalensis) is a species of gecko endemic to Pakistan. It is sometimes placed in the genus Cyrtopodion.
