= Douglas Kinnaird =

English banker and politician (1788–1830)

The Honourable Douglas James William Kinnaird (26 February 1788 – 12 March 1830) was an English banker, politician, friend of Lord Byron and amateur cricketer. He was a Managing Partner in the banking firm of Ransom & Co. He also briefly served as Member of Parliament for Bishop's Castle from 1819 to 1820.

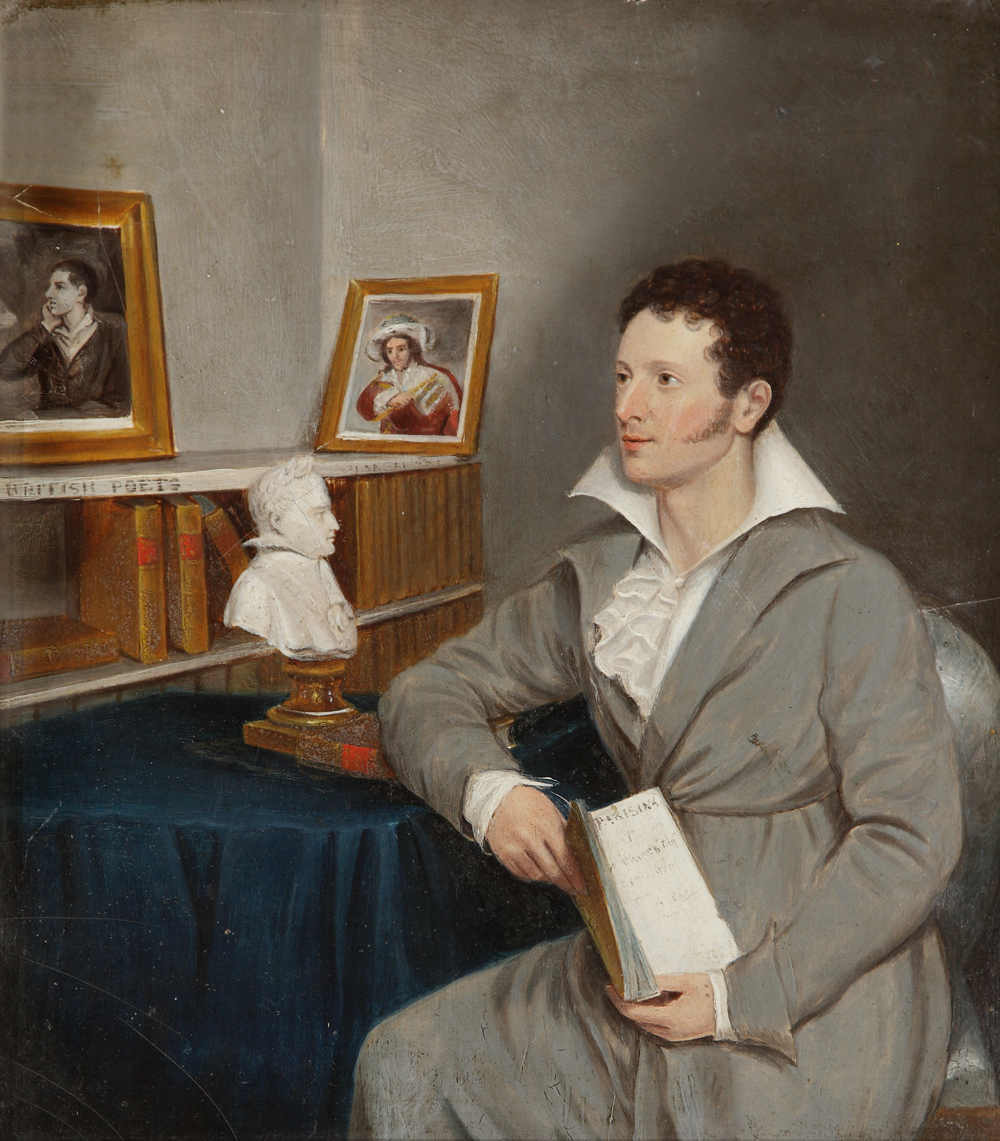
Douglas Kinnaird.

== Early life ==
Kinnaird was the fifth son of George Kinnaird, 7th Lord Kinnaird and his wife Elizabeth, daughter of the banker Griffin Ransom; and younger brother of Charles Kinnaird, 8th Lord Kinnaird (1780–1826). He was educated first at Eton College, and then at Göttingen, where he acquired a knowledge of German and French. He was admitted to Lincoln's Inn in 1807. He went to Trinity College, Cambridge, where he graduated M.A. in 1811.

In 1813 Kinnaird travelled with his friend John Cam Hobhouse on the continent, and was present at the battle of Culm. In the autumn of 1814 he travelled home from Paris with William Jerdan After his return to England he took an active share in the business of Ransom & Morland's bank, and on the dissolution of the partnership with Sir Francis Bernard Morland in 1819, assumed the chief management of the new firm.

== Relationship with Byron ==
In 1815 Kinnaird became, with Byron, Samuel Whitbread, Peter Moore, and others, a member of the sub-committee for directing the affairs of Drury Lane Theatre. In 1817 he visited Byron at Venice. He was a close friend of Byron, who called him "my trusty and trustworthy trustee and banker, and crown and sheet anchor" He was consulted by Byron on his business negotiations with John Murray, and with Hobhouse insisted on the destruction of the Byron memoirs, after Byron's death.

It was at Kinnaird's request that Byron wrote the Hebrew Melodies and the Monody on the Death of the Right Hon. R. B. Sheridan, spoken at Drury Lane Theatre. Jerdan related that Samuel Taylor Coleridge, when his tragedy Remorse was under consideration by the Drury Lane authorities, was invited to read it to Kinnaird; after two acts, Kinnaird remarked that he had "listened to enough of your nonsense", and invited attention to a two-act piece of his own.

== In politics ==
At the general election in the summer of 1818 Kinnaird was nominated a candidate for the city of Westminster in the reform interest, but finding the contest hopeless withdrew after the third day's polling, and canvassed actively on behalf of Francis Burdett. Kinnaird refused to be nominated again on the death of Sir Samuel Romilly, the senior member, in November 1818, and seconded his friend Hobhouse, who was defeated after a vigorous contest by George Lamb in March 1819. At a by-election in July 1819 Kinnaird was returned to the House of Commons for the borough of Bishop's Castle, Shropshire, and in his maiden speech on 30 November 1819 supported Lord Althorp's motion for a select committee on the state of the country. Kinnaird also took part in the debate on Hobhouse's anonymous pamphlet on 10 December, and contended that "any conclusion might be drawn from it" rather than that it was meant as an excitement to rebellion.

At the general election in March 1820 Kinnaird was included in the double return for Bishops Castle, but in the following June was declared 'not duly elected' by the select committee appointed to try the petition. He made no further attempt to enter parliament, but frequently took part in the discussions at India House. He was a member of the "Rota", a radical dinner club, to which Bickersteth, Burdett, and Hobhouse also belonged, and was famous for his "mob dinners", with thirty or forty guests.

== Death ==
Kinnaird died unmarried in Pall Mall East, London, after a long illness, on 12 March 1830, aged 42.

== Works ==
His works were:

- The Merchant of Bruges, or Beggar's Bush [a comedy by John Fletcher], with considerable alterations and additions, by Douglas Kinnaird, Esq. Now performing … at the Theatre Royal, Drury Lane, London, 1815. This comedy was reprinted in several collections of plays. The first three songs in it were written by George Lamb, to whom it was dedicated, while Hobhouse was the author of the prologue and epilogue.
- Remarks on the Volume of Hydrabad Papers printed for the use of the East India Proprietors [entitled "Papers relating to the pecuniary transactions of Messrs. W. Palmer & Co. with the Government of … the Nizam"], London, 1825.

== Cricketer ==
Kinnaird made 19 known appearances in important matches from 1808 to 1822. He was mainly associated with Marylebone Cricket Club (MCC) and he also played for Surrey and Middlesex.

== External sources ==
- Hansard 1803–2005: contributions in Parliament by Mr Douglas Kinnaird

Attribution

This article incorporates text from a publication now in the public domain: "Kinnaird, Douglas James William". Dictionary of National Biography. London: Smith, Elder & Co. 1885–1900.
