= George Kinnaird, 1st Lord Kinnaird =

Scottish aristocrat

George Kinnaird, 1st Lord Kinnaird (c. 1622–29 December 1689) was a 17th-century Scottish aristocrat. In 1170 William the Lion bestowed by charter the barony of Kinnaird on his ancestor Rufus. A Royalist, in 1661, after the Restoration, he was made a member of the Privy Council of Scotland. He sat in Parliament from 1661 to 1663 for Perthshire.

In 1678, he passed his lands and baronies of Inchmichael and Inchture to his son Patrick. Charles II knighted him 28 December 1682 and he became Lord Kinnaird of Inchture (Peerage of Scotland).

Peerage of Scotland
New creation	Lord Kinnaird; 1682–1689	Succeeded by Patrick Kinnaird
