= YWCA =

International organization for women

- Young Women's Christian Association
- Founded: 1855; 171 years ago
- Founder: Mary Jane Kinnaird; Emma Robarts
- Founded at: London, United Kingdom
- Headquarters: Le Grand-Saconnex, Canton of Geneva, Switzerland
- Region served: Worldwide
- Website: www.worldywca.org

The Young Women's Christian Association (YWCA) is a nonprofit organization with a focus on empowerment, leadership, and rights of women, young women, and girls in more than 100 countries.

The World office is currently based in Le Grand-Saconnex, Canton of Geneva, Switzerland, and the nonprofit is headquartered in Washington, DC.

The YWCA is independent of the YMCA, but a few local and national YMCA and YWCA associations have merged into YM/YWCAs or YMCA-YWCAs and belong to both organizations, while providing the programs from each (e.g. Sweden did so in 1966).

== Governance structure ==
The World Board serves as the governing body of the World YWCA, comprising representatives from all regions of the global YWCA movement. It oversees the organization's operations and activities. On the other hand, the World Council acts as the legislative authority and governing body of the World YWCA. It convenes every four years to make significant decisions affecting the entire movement, including policy, constitution, strategic direction, and budgets. During the World Council meetings, 20 women are elected to serve on the World Board, representing various member associations affiliated with the global YWCA movement.

== History ==
The YWCA history dates back to 1855, when the philanthropist Lady Mary Jane Kinnaird founded the North London Home for nurses travelling to or from the Crimean War. The home addressed the needs of single women arriving from rural areas to join the industrial workforce in London, by offering housing, education and support with a "warm Christian atmosphere". Kinnaird's organisation merged with the Prayer Union started by evangelist Emma Robarts in 1877.

The Australian YWCA was formed in 1880 when Mary Jane Barker organised the initial meeting in Sydney. Ann Alison Goodlet became its first President. Goodlet served until 1903.

In 1884, the YWCA was restructured. Until then, London had had almost a separate organisation, but there was now one YWCA organisation. Beneath this there were separate staffs and Presidents for London, England and Wales, Scotland, Ireland, "Foreign" and Colonial and Missionary. This organisation distributed Christian texts and literature, but it also interviewed young women in an effort to improve living conditions. In 1884, they were working amongst Scottish fisherwomen, publishing their own magazine and operating a ladies' restaurant in London.

The World YWCA was founded in 1894, with USA, Great Britain, Norway and Sweden as its founding mothers.

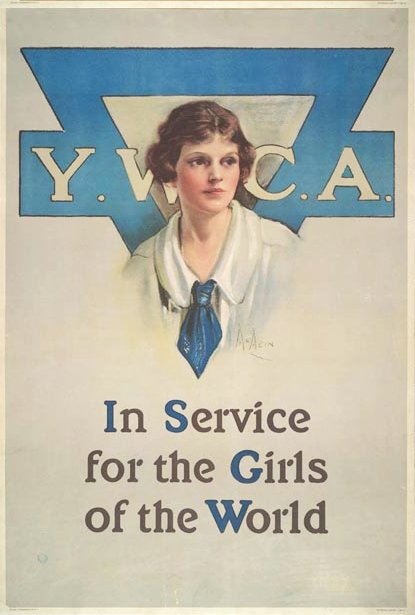
A YWCA poster from 1919

The first world conference of the YWCA was held in 1898 in London, with 326 participants from 77 countries from around the world.

=== Early 20th century ===
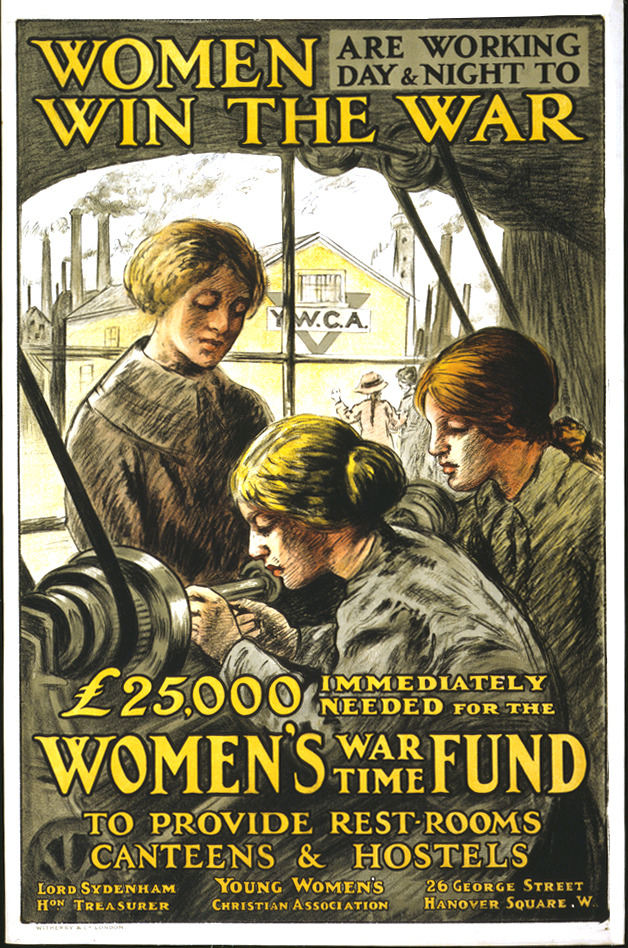
Poster urging women to join the British war effort in World War I, published by the YWCA

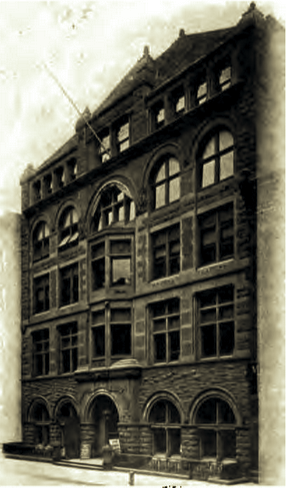
YWCA, New York City

In the beginning of the 20th century, a shift began within the YWCA. While industrialization had been a founding concern of the association, it had sought primarily to evangelise, and to protect women morally and socially from the consequences of urban life. But the emerging socialist movement began to affect these objectives. The first sign of this was during the 1910 World YWCA conference in Berlin, when a resolution was passed against considerable opposition, requiring the association to study social and industrial problems, and to educate working women about the "social measures and legislation enacted in their behalf." Over time the well-organised activists were able to take control of the YWCA, discard its original purposes, and employ it as part of their own movement. By 1920 the process was complete, and the YWCA became a largely secular organisation in all but name, with ties to Social Gospel groups.

In 1924, Elizabeth Ross Haynes became the first African American woman elected to the national board.

Until 1930, the headquarters of the World YWCA were in London. The executive committee was entirely British, with an American General Secretary. This policy resulted in a resolutely Anglocentric lens through which the association viewed the world. In 1930, however, the World YWCA headquarters were moved to Geneva, Switzerland, the same city as the newly formed League of Nations. This was symbolic of the drive to become a more diverse association, and also to co-operate fully with other organizations in Geneva (such as the International Committee of the Red Cross, World Student Christian Federation, and the YMCA).

Domestic Science Kitchen, YWCA, Minneapolis, Minn

=== World War II ===
In several countries, particularly in Eastern Europe, YWCAs were suppressed and disbanded. Throughout occupied Europe, however, women worked to construct support systems for their neighbors and refugees.

Shortly after the end of the war, the YWCA worked to fortify the bonds of women throughout the world by holding the first World Council meeting in nearly a decade in Hangzhou in 1947. This was significant in being the first World Council held outside of the West, and further voiced the desire to be an inclusive, worldwide movement. It also served to bring together women who lived in countries that had been enemies during the war, and to raise awareness among the western YWCAs that the ruin of war was not limited to Europe.

During the following decades, the World YWCA spent much time researching and working with the issues of refugees, health, HIV and AIDS, literacy, the human rights of women and girls, the advancement of women and the eradication of poverty; mutual service, sustainable development and the environment; education and youth, peace and disarmament, and young women's leadership. These issues continue to play an integral role in the World YWCA movement.

== Programs ==
=== YWCA Week Without Violence ===
Each year during the third week of October, YWCAs worldwide focus on raising awareness to end violence against women and girls.

=== YWCA Week of Prayer ===
Starting in 1904, the World YWCA and the World Alliance of YMCAs have issued a joint call to prayer during the Week of Prayer and World Fellowship. During this week, the two movements pray and act together on a particular theme in solidarity with members and partners around the world. The week-long event is a Bible study based on that year's theme.

=== World YWCA Day ===
In 1948, World YWCA's Observance Day was born, to help each member see how she could act locally in relation to the theme for the year. Some chosen themes for the Observance Day have been: My Faith and My Work, My Place in the World, My Contribution to World Peace, I Confront a Changing World, Toward One World and My Task in Family Life Today. In 1972, the event name was changed to World YWCA Day, and the date of celebration for World YWCA Day became April 24.

== YWCAs around the world ==
YWCA has a presence in over 100 countries, and includes national and regional entities in eight global regions. Many regional YWCAs operate as independent entities at the local level and belong to their country's national YWCA body as part of a federated, membership-based model.

=== Europe ===
The European YWCA includes national YWCAs in Belarus, Belgium, Denmark, Great Britain, Norway, Romania, and more. The European YWCA is a regional legally registered body, serving as an umbrella organization for the national YWCAs around the European continent. YWCA Scotland works under the name The Young Women's Movement.

=== Middle East ===
The YWCAs of the Middle East region are in Egypt, Jordan, Lebanon, and Palestine.

=== Africa ===
There are over 20 national YWCAs serving communities across the Africa region, including in Burkina Faso, Malawi, South Africa, and Togo.

=== Asia ===
YWCA has a presence in a number of countries in Asia, including Bangladesh, China, India, Korea, Nepal, Taiwan, Philippines, and Thailand. Sophia Cooke established the Young Women's Christian Association in Singapore in 1875.

=== Pacific ===
National YWCAs in the Pacific region include New Zealand, Australia, Papua New Guinea, Solomon Islands, Fiji, and Samoa. In 1878, Dunedin activists established the first YWCA in the southern hemisphere. The YWCA branch in Christchurch was established in 1883 to support visitations to the sick; and, in 1885 Auckland's chapter started up with a strong focus on providing a clean and properly supervised living space for working girls. YWCA Australia dates back to 1880, when the first YWCA in the country was established in Sydney to help migrant women.

=== North America ===
In North America, YWCA has a presence in the United States and Canada. YWCA USA was founded in 1858 and today has over 200 member associations, serving over 2 million women, girls, and their families. YWCA USA is one of the largest provider of domestic violence programs and shelters in the United States. YWCA Canada dates back to 1870. Today, YWCA Canada has over 30 member associations, serving 1 million women, girls, and their families.

YWCA USA is headquartered in Washington, DC. Previously its headquarters were in the Empire State Building in New York City.

Reception of the main YWCA office on Locust St in Philadelphia, early 20th century

=== Caribbean ===
National YWCAs in the Caribbean region include Barbados, Grenada, Haiti, and Trinidad & Tobago.

=== Middle and South America ===
YWCAs of Latina America include Argentina, Belize, Bolivia, Brazil, Chile, Colombia, Honduras, and Suriname.

=== Leadership since 1855 ===
Past Presidents
Name	Country	Year
Mrs. J. Herbert Tritton	United Kingdom	1898–1902
Mrs. George Campbell	United Kingdom	1902–1906
Miss Mary Morley	United Kingdom	1906–1910
Mrs. J. Herbert Tritton	United Kingdom	1910–1914
The Hon. Mrs. Montague Weldgrave	United Kingdom	1914–1924
The Rt. Hon. The Baroness Parmoor	United Kingdom	1924–1928
The Hon. Mrs. Montague Weldgrave	United Kingdom	1928–1930
Miss C. M. Van Asch Van Wijck	Netherlands	1930–1938
Miss Ruth Rouse	United Kingdom	1938–1946
Miss C. M. Van Asch Van Wijck	Netherlands	1946–1947
Miss Lilace Reid Barnes	USA	1947–1955
The Hon. Isabel Catto	United Kingdom	1955–1963
Dr. Una B. Porter	Australia	1963–1967
Mrs. Athena Athanassiou	Greece	1967–1975
Dame Nita Barrow	Barbados	1975–1983
Mrs. Ann Northcote	Canada	1983–1987
Dr. Jewel Freeman Graham	USA	1987–1991
Mrs. Razia Ismail Abbasi	India	1991–1995
Mrs. Anita Andersson	Sweden	1995–1999
Ms. Jane Lee Wolfe	USA	1999–2003
Ms Mónica Zetzsche	Argentina	2003–2007
Susan Brenan	Australia	2007–2011
Deborah Thomas-Austin	Trinidad and Tobago	2011–2019
Mira Rizeq	Palestine	2019–pres.

Past General Secretaries
Name	Country	Year
Miss Annie Reynolds	USA	1894–1904
Miss Clarissa Spencer	USA	1904–1920
Miss Charlotte T. Niven	USA	1920–1935
Miss Ruth Woodsmall	USA	1935–1947
Miss Helen Roberts	United Kingdom	1947–1955
Miss Elizabeth Palmer	USA	1955–1978
Miss Erica Brodie	New Zealand	1978–1982
Mrs. Ruth Sovik	USA	1982–1985
Miss Ellen Clark (acting)	USA	1985–1986
Mrs. Genevieve Jacques (acting)	France	1986–1987
Mrs. Elaine Hesse Steel	New Zealand	1987–1997
Dr. Musimbi Kanyoro	Kenya	1998–2007
Mrs. Nyaradzai Gumbonzvanda	Zimbabwe	2007–2016
Ms. Malayah Harper	Canada	2016–2019
Mrs. Casey Harden	USA	2019–pres.

== Partners ==
The World YWCA is involved and is a part of the Big Six Alliance of Youth Organisations (World Alliance of Young Men's Christian Associations, World Young Women's Christian Association, World Organization of the Scout Movement, World Association of Girl Guides and Girl Scouts, and the International Federation of Red Cross and Red Crescent Societies and The Duke of Edinburgh's International Award Foundation). It is also a member of Accountable Now, ACT Alliance, and has consultative status with United Nations Economic and Social Council (ECOSOC). World YWCA works in partnership with a number of ecumenical players (World Council of Churches, World Student Christian Federation, Lutheran World Federation, etc.) and a number of international institutional and government donors.

== Bibliography ==
- Mary S. Sims, The YWCA: An Unfolding Purpose (New York: Woman's Press, 1950)
- Mary S. Sims, The Purpose Widens, 1947-1967 (New York: YWCA, 1969)
- Anna Rice, A History of the World's Young Women's Christian Association (New York: Woman's Press 1947)
- Karen Garner, Global Feminism and Postwar Reconstruction: The World YWCA Visitation to Occupied Japan, 1947
- Carole Seymour-Jones, Journey of Faith: The History of the World YWCA 1945-1994 (London: Allison & Busby 1994)
- Dorothea Browder, A Christian Solution of the Labor Situation: How Workingwomen Reshaped the YWCA's Religious Mission and Politics (Journal of Women's History, Vol. 19, Summer 2007)
- List of other YWCA articles

=== Archives ===
- Young Women's Christian Association (University of Washington) Records. 1903–1982. 50.6 cubic feet. At the Labor Archives of Washington, University of Washington Libraries Special Collections.
- Young Women's Christian Association of Canada fonds at Library and Archives Canada. The archival reference number is R4957. 1870–1991. 26.1 meters of textual records;1045 photographs (chiefly b&w); 7 audio discs (ca. 3 h, 11 min.); 9 architectural drawings; 5 crests and pennants; 2 printing blocks, linocut, photomechanical cut; 1 print photo-mechanical; 1 award plexiglass; 12 audio reels (ca. 11 h, 35 min); 7 audio cassettes (ca. 7 h, 30 min.); 7 film reels (ca. 3 h).
