= Lord Kinnaird =

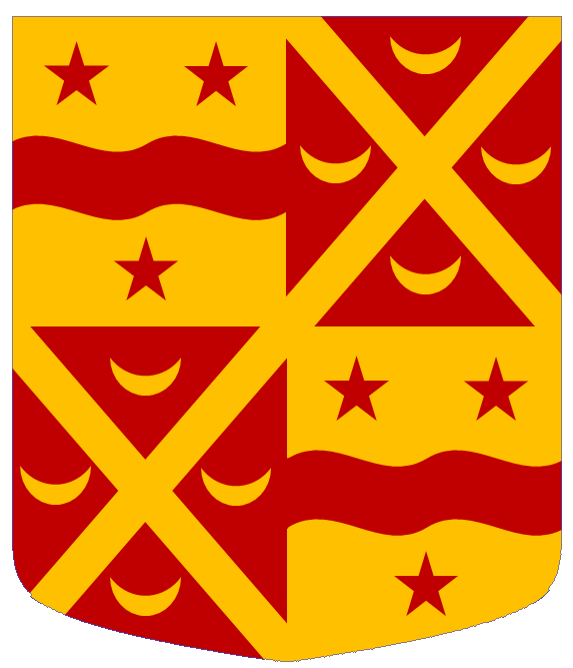
Arms of the Lords Kinnaird.

Lord Kinnaird was a title in the Peerage of Scotland. It was created in 1682 for George Kinnaird. The ninth Lord was created Baron Rossie, of Rossie in the County of Perth, in the Peerage of the United Kingdom in 1831, with normal remainder to the heirs male of his body. In 1860 he was made Baron Kinnaird, of Rossie in the County of Perth, also in the Peerage of the United Kingdom, with special remainder to his younger brother, Arthur. Lord Kinnaird had no surviving male issue and the barony of Rossie became extinct on his death in 1878. He was succeeded in the Scottish lordship and barony of Kinnaird by his younger brother, Arthur, the tenth Lord. The eleventh Lord was a leading footballer and President of The Football Association. The titles became dormant upon the death of the thirteenth Lord in 1997.

== Lords Kinnaird (1682) ==
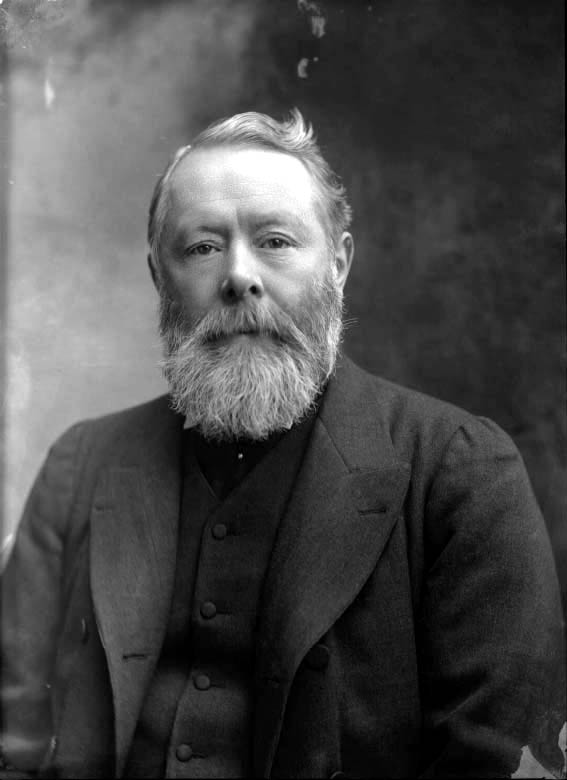
Arthur Kinnaird, 11th Lord Kinnaird, c. 1905. He was a leading footballer and then president of The Football Association until his death in 1923

- George Kinnaird, 1st Lord Kinnaird (d. 1689)
- Patrick Kinnaird, 2nd Lord Kinnaird (1653–1701)
- Patrick Kinnaird, 3rd Lord Kinnaird (1683–1715)
- Patrick Kinnaird, 4th Lord Kinnaird (1707–1727)
- Charles Kinnaird, 5th Lord Kinnaird (1684–1758)
- Charles Kinnaird, 6th Lord Kinnaird (1719–1767)
- George Kinnaird, 7th Lord Kinnaird (1754–1805)
- Charles Kinnaird, 8th Lord Kinnaird (1780–1826)
- George William Fox Kinnaird, 9th Lord Kinnaird, 1st Baron Kinnaird (1807–1878)
  - Victor Alexander Kinnaird, Master of Kinnaird (1840–1851)
  - Charles Fox Kinnaird, Master of Kinnaird (1841–1860)
- Arthur Fitzgerald Kinnaird, 10th Lord Kinnaird, 2nd Baron Kinnaird (1814–1887)
- Arthur Fitzgerald Kinnaird, 11th Lord Kinnaird, 3rd Baron Kinnaird (1847–1923)
  - Hon. Douglas Arthur Kinnaird, Master of Kinnaird (1879–1914)
- Kenneth Fitzgerald Kinnaird, 12th Lord Kinnaird, 4th Baron Kinnaird (1880–1972)
- Graham Charles Kinnard, 13th Lord Kinnaird, 5th Baron Kinnaird (1912–1997)
  - Nicholas Charles Kinnaird (1946–1951)
