= 1888–89 Preston North End F.C. season =

English football club season

Preston North End
1888–89 season
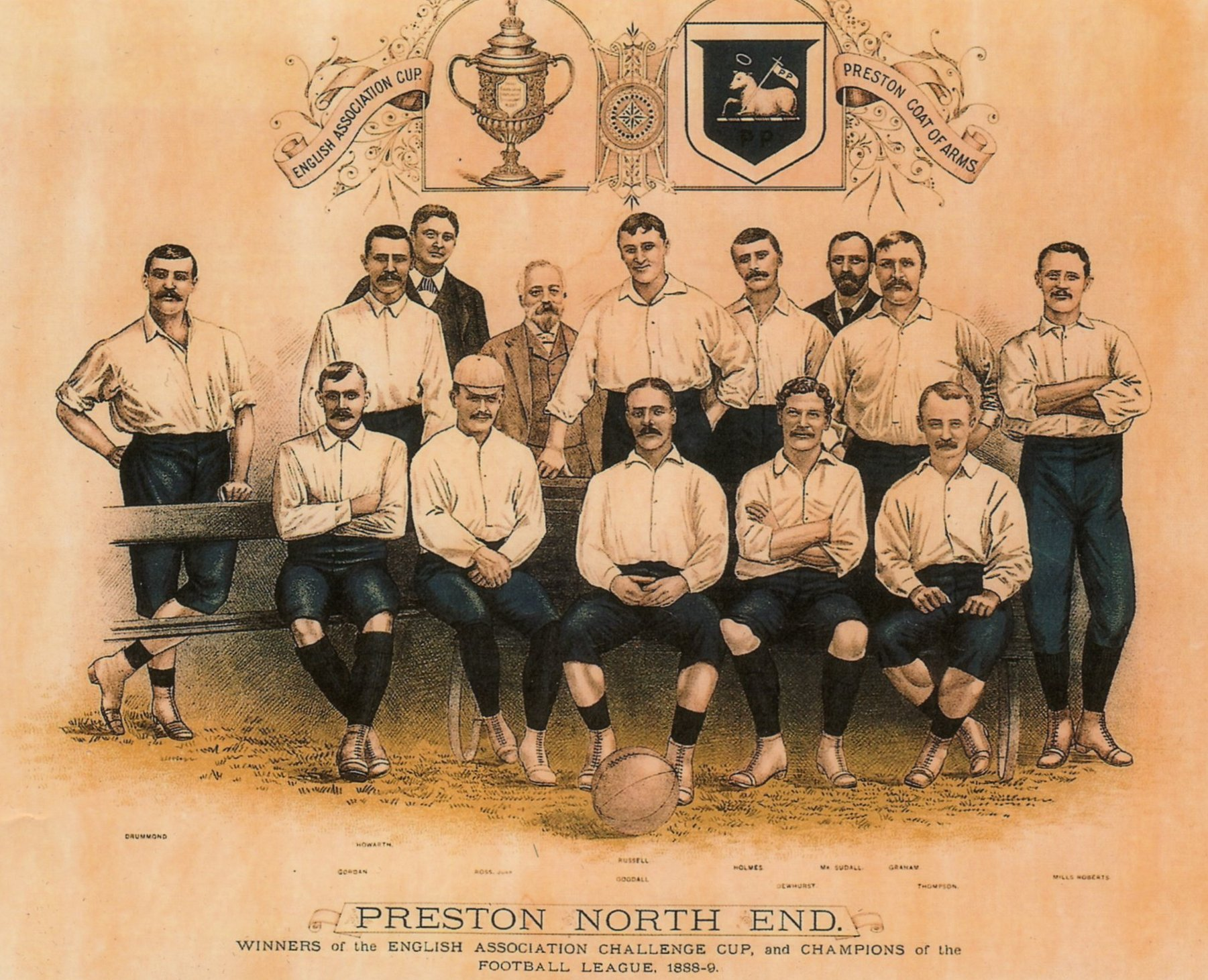
- 1888–89 squad
- Manager: Selection Commmitte
- Football League: 1st
- FA Cup: Winners
- Top goalscorer: League: John Goodall (21); All: John Goodall (23)
- Biggest win: 7–0 vs. Notts County, Football League, 3 November 1888; 7–0 vs. Stoke, Football League, 12 November 1888
Home colours

The 1888–89 season was Preston North End's first season in the Football League, which had just been founded. Because of this, Preston became one of the founder members of the Football League. Preston were very successful during the season as they went on to claim the league and cup double without being defeated.

== Final league table ==
Pos	Team	Pld	W	D	L	GF	GA	GAv	Pts
1	Preston North End (C)	22	18	4	0	74	15	4.933	40
2	Aston Villa	22	12	5	5	61	43	1.419	29
3	Wolverhampton Wanderers	22	12	4	6	51	37	1.378	28
4	Blackburn Rovers	22	10	6	6	66	45	1.467	26
5	Bolton Wanderers	22	10	2	10	63	59	1.068	22

Source: World Football
Rules for classification: 1) Points; 2) Goal average; 3) Goals scored
(C) Champions

== Results ==
Preston's score comes first

=== Legend ===
Win	Draw

=== Football League ===
Match	Date	Opponent	Venue	Result	Attendance	Scorers
1	8 September 1888	Burnley	H	5–2	5,000	Gordon, Ross (2), Dewhurst (2)
2	15 September 1888	Wolverhampton Wanderers	A	4–0	5,000	Gordon, Ross, A Goodall, J Goodall
3	22 September 1888	Bolton Wanderers	H	3–1	5,000	Gordon (2), Drummond
4	29 September 1888	Derby County	A	3–2	6,000	Robertson, Ross (2)
5	6 October 1888	Stoke	H	7–0	3,000	Ross (4), Whittle, J Goodall, Dewhurst
6	13 October 1888	West Bromwich Albion	H	3–0	10,000	Dewhurst, Edwards (2)
7	20 October 1888	Accrington	A	0–0	6,000	
8	27 October 1888	Wolverhampton Wanderers	H	5–2	6,000	Gordon, Ross, J Goodall (3)
9	3 November 1888	Notts County	A	7–0	7,000	Gordon (3), Ross, J Goodall (3)
10	10 November 1888	Aston Villa	H	1–1	10,000	J Goodall
11	12 November 1888	Stoke	A	3–0	4,500	Ross, Thomson, Robertson
12	17 November 1888	Accrington	H	2–0	7,000	Gordon, Dewhurst
13	24 November 1888	Bolton Wanderers	A	5–2	10,000	Ross (2), Robertson, Dewhurst, J Goodall
14	8 December 1888	Derby County	H	5–0	4,000	Inglis, J Goodall (2), Dewhurst (2)
15	15 December 1888	Burnley	A	2–2	8,000	Ross, Thomson
16	22 December 1888	Everton	H	3–0	8,000	Dewhurst, J Goodall (2)
17	26 December 1888	West Bromwich Albion	A	5–0	5,150	J Goodall (2), Ross (2), Gordon
18	29 December 1888	Blackburn Rovers	H	1–0	8,000	J Goodall
19	5 January 1889	Notts County	H	4–1	4,000	J Goodall (2), Edwards
20	12 January 1889	Blackburn Rovers	A	2–2	10,000	Dewhurst, Thomson
21	19 January 1889	Everton	A	2–0	15,000	J Goodall, Ross
22	9 February 1889	Aston Villa	A	2–0	10,000	Dewhurst (2)

=== FA Cup ===
Round	Date	Opponent	Venue	Result	Attendance	Scorers
R1	2 February 1889	Bootle	A	3–0	1,000	J Goodall, Gordon, Thomson
R2	16 February 1889	Grimsby Town	A	2–0	8,000	J Goodall, Ross
R3	2 March 1889	Birmingham St George's	H	2–0	8,000	Holmes, Thomson
Semi final	16 March 1889	West Bromwich Albion	N	1–0	22,688	Russell
Final	30 March 1889	Wolverhampton Wanderers	N	3–0	25,000	Dewhurst, Thomson, Ross

== Statistics ==
=== Appearances and Goals ===
No.	Pos	Nat	Player	Total		First Division		FA Cup	
No.	Pos	Nat	Player	Apps	Goals	Apps	Goals	Apps	Goals
	FW	(England) ENG	Fred Dewhurst	21	13	16	12	5	1
	FB	(Scotland) SCO	George Drummond	16	1	12	1	4	0
	FW	(England) ENG	Jack Edwards	4	3	4	3	0	0
	FW	(Ireland) EIR	Archie Goodall	2	1	2	1	0	0
	FW	(England) ENG	John Goodall	26	23	21	21	5	2
	FW	(Scotland) SCO	Jack Gordon	25	11	20	10	5	1
	HB	(Scotland) SCO	Johnny Graham	26	0	22	0	4	0
	HB	(Scotland) SCO	Willie Graham	5	0	5	0	0	0
	FB	(England) ENG	Robert Holmes	27	1	22	0	5	1
	FB	(England) ENG	Bob Howarth	23	0	18	0	5	0
	FW	(Scotland) SCO	Jock Inglis	1	1	1	1	0	0
	GK	(Wales) WAL	Robert Mills-Roberts	7	0	2	0	5	0
	HB	(Scotland) SCO	Sandy Robertson	22	3	21	3	1	0
	FW	(Scotland) SCO	Jimmy Ross	26	21	21	19	5	2
	HB	(Scotland) SCO	David Russell	23	1	18	0	5	1
	FW	(Scotland) SCO	Sammy Thomson	21	6	16	3	5	3
	GK	(Wales) WAL	James Trainer	20	0	20	0	0	0
	FB	(England) ENG	Richard Whittle	1	1	1	1	0	0

== See also ==
- 1888–89 in English football
- List of Preston North End F.C. seasons
