= The Invincibles (English football) =

Nickname applied to successful football teams

In English football, "The Invincibles" is a nickname used to refer to the Preston North End team of the 1888–89 season, managed by William Sudell, and the Arsenal team of the 2003–04 season managed by Arsène Wenger. Preston North End earned the nickname after completing an entire season undefeated in league and cup competition (27 games), while Arsenal were undefeated in the league (38 games) in a run that stretched to a record 49 games.

== Preston North End ==
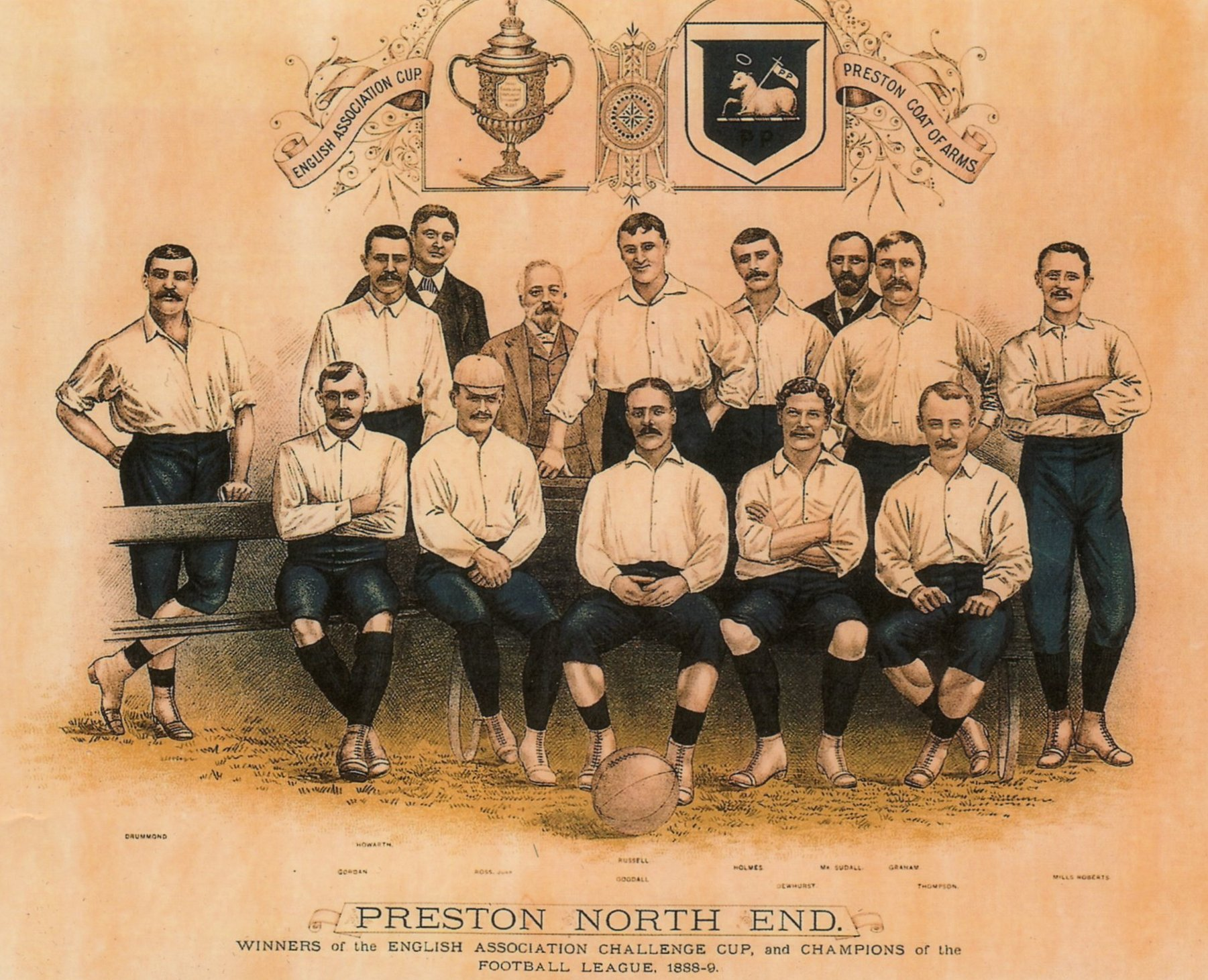
The 1888–89 season was Preston North End's first season in the Football League (and the first edition of the championship); they went on to claim the league and FA Cup double without being defeated, which earned the squad legendary status.

The "Invincibles" nickname was first coined in 1883, long before the inaugural Football League competition. The term was used by the press in attempt to sneer or devalue Preston's achievements at the time due to the club's unpopular professional status; Preston was one of the first sides in England to pay footballers to play for the club and the side was very successful under Sudell before the Football League. After Preston played Upton Park in the FA Cup in January 1884, their opponents reported the club for fielding a professional side to the Football Association, and Preston were subsequently disqualified from the competition.

After they won the inaugural Football League competition in 1888–89, the nickname returned in a commemorative capacity; completing the season unbeaten in both the league and the FA Cup, so becoming the first team ever to achieve the "Double". Preston's league record was 18 wins, 4 draws, and 0 losses out of 22 games played, while in the FA Cup they won all 5 of their matches without conceding a single goal. Preston achieved this with a squad primarily composed of Scottish players, part of a wave of Scottish footballers in England who became known as the Scotch Professors.

The following season, Preston won their first league match to stretch their unbeaten league run to 23 games; in their second game they suffered their first-ever league defeat against Aston Villa, losing 5–3. In his autobiography, Tom Finney wrote: "The championship stayed with North End – by now tagged the Old Invincibles – the following year, but runners-up spot had to suffice for the next three seasons".

Of the eight teams to have completed the Double in England, Preston remain the only one to have done so unbeaten. In 2008, Preston opened a new 5,000 seater stand at their Deepdale stadium, named the Invincibles Pavilion in honour of the unbeaten 1880s team that had also played their home matches at the same site.

Preston North End "Invincibles" squad
Name	Pos.	Apps.	Goals
Fred Dewhurst (ENG)	FW	21	13
George Drummond (SCO)	HB	16	1
Jack Edwards (ENG)	FW	4	3
Archie Goodall (IRE)	FW	2	1
John Goodall (ENG)	FW	26	22
Jack Gordan (SCO)	FW	25	11
Johnny Graham (SCO)	HB	26	0
Willie Graham (SCO)	HB	5	0
Bob Holmes (ENG)	FB	26	1
Bob Howarth (ENG)	FB	23	0
Jock Inglis (SCO)	FW	1	1
Robert Mills-Roberts (WAL)	GK	7	0
Sandy Robertson (SCO)	HB	22	3
Jimmy Ross (SCO)	FW	26	21
David Russell (SCO)	HB	26	19
Sammy Thomson (SCO)	FW	21	6
James Trainer (WAL)	GK	20	0
Richard Whittle (ENG)	FB	1	1

=== Matches ===
==== Football League ====
No.	Date	Opponent	Result	Scorers	Att.
1	8 September 1888	Burnley (H)	5–2	Gordon, Ross (2), Dewhurst (2)	5,000
2	15 September 1888	Wolverhampton Wanderers (A)	4–0	Gordon, Ross, A. Goodall, J. Goodall	5,000
3	22 September 1888	Bolton Wanderers (H)	3–1	Gordon (2), Drummond	5,000
4	29 September 1888	Derby County (A)	3–2	Robertson, Ross (2)	6,000
5	6 October 1888	Stoke (H)	7–0	Ross (4), Whittle, J. Goodall, Dewhurst	3,000
6	13 October 1888	West Bromwich Albion (H)	3–0	Dewhurst, Edwards (2)	10,000
7	20 October 1888	Accrington (A)	0–0		6,000
8	27 October 1888	Wolverhampton Wanderers (H)	5–2	Gordon, Ross, J. Goodall (3)	6,000
9	3 November 1888	Notts County (A)	7–0	Gordon (3), Ross, J. Goodall (3)	7,000
10	10 November 1888	Aston Villa (H)	1–1	J. Goodall	10,000
11	12 November 1888	Stoke (A)	3–0	Ross, Thomson, Robertson	4,500
12	17 November 1888	Accrington (H)	2–0	Gordon, Dewhurst	7,000
13	24 November 1888	Bolton Wanderers (A)	5–2	Ross (2), Robertson, Dewhurst, J. Goodall	10,000
14	8 December 1888	Derby County (H)	5–0	Inglis, J. Goodall (2), Dewhurst (2)	4,000
15	15 December 1888	Burnley (A)	2–2	Ross, Thomson	8,000
16	22 December 1888	Everton (H)	3–0	Dewhurst, J. Goodall (2)	8,000
17	26 December 1888	West Bromwich Albion (A)	5–0	J. Goodall (2), Ross (2), Gordon	5,150
18	29 December 1888	Blackburn Rovers (H)	1–0	J. Goodall	8,000
19	5 January 1889	Notts County (H)	4–1	J. Goodall (2), Edwards, unknown	4,000
20	12 January 1889	Blackburn Rovers (A)	2–2	Dewhurst, Thomson	10,000
21	19 January 1889	Everton (A)	2–0	J. Goodall, Ross	15,000
22	9 February 1889	Aston Villa (A)	2–0	Dewhurst (2)	10,000

==== FA Cup ====
Round	Date	Opponent	Result	Scorers	Att.
1	2 February 1889	Bootle (A)	3–0	J. Goodall, Gordon, Thomson	1,000
2	16 February 1889	Grimsby Town (A)	2–0	J. Goodall, Ross	8,000
3	2 March 1889	Birmingham St George's (H)	2–0	Holmes, Thomson	8,000
Semi-final	16 March 1889	West Bromwich Albion (N)	1–0	Russell	22,688
Final	30 March 1889	Wolverhampton Wanderers (N)	3–0	Dewhurst, Thomson, Ross	25,000

== Arsenal ==
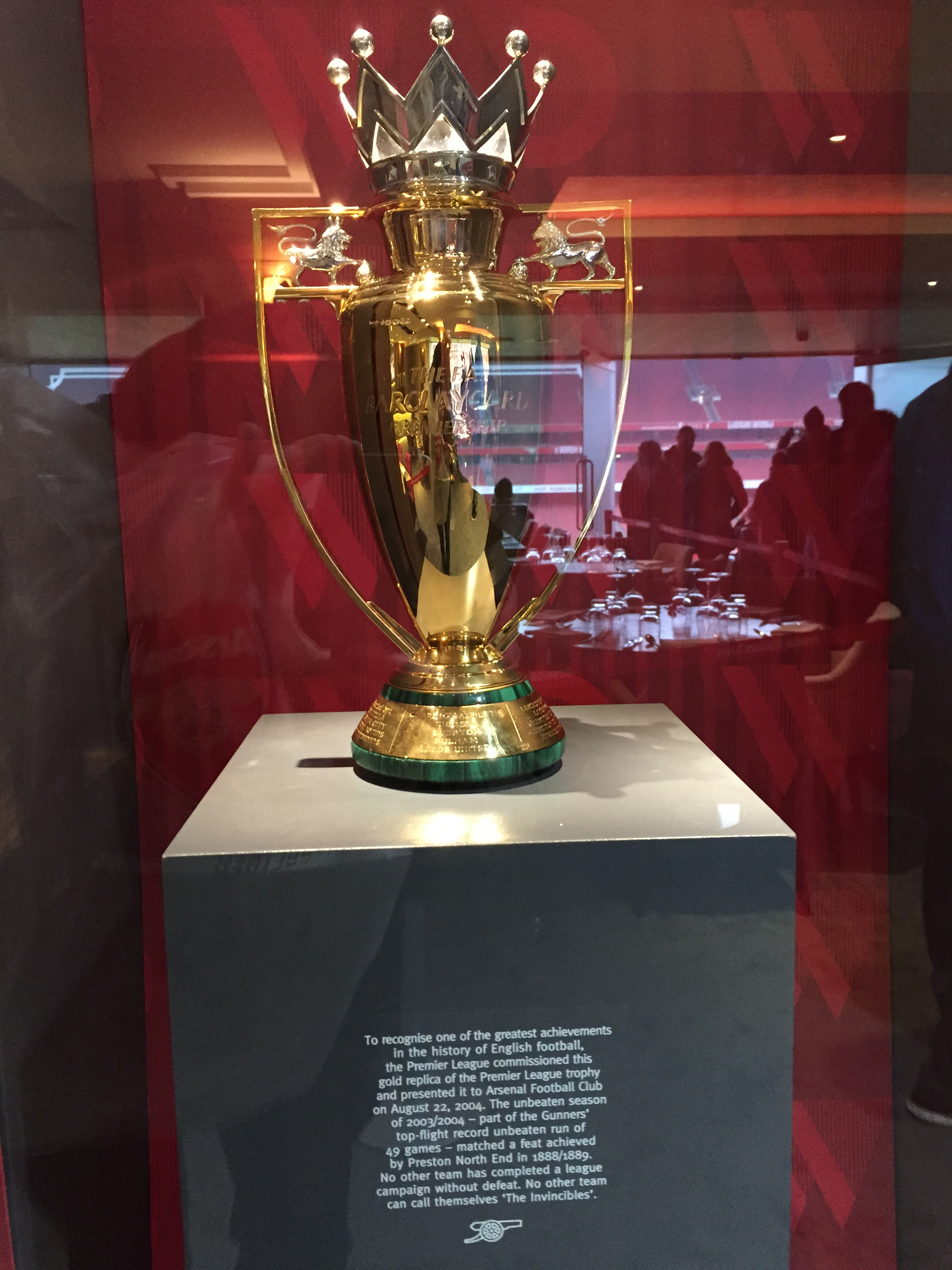
After Arsenal became the only team to finish a 38-match season unbeaten, the Premier League commissioned a unique gold trophy to commemorate the achievement. Arsène Wenger was presented the trophy as a parting gift from the club after his last home game as manager on 6 May 2018.

In May 2002, Arsenal beat Manchester United to regain the Premier League and equal Preston's record of not losing an away match all season. In assessing the team's achievement, Tim Rich of The Independent wrote: "Invincibles, they called the last team to go through a season unbeaten away from home, although it is a word which belongs far more to the Arsenal side of 2001-02 than it ever could to the Preston team of 1888–89." Arsenal manager Arsène Wenger wanted his team to push on for more honours and described the defeat of Manchester United as a "shift of power" in English football. The team began the following season in good stead; a 4–1 win against Leeds United in September 2002 meant Arsenal broke the domestic record for scoring in consecutive games (47), and away league games without defeat (22). Such was their effective start to the campaign, Wenger reiterated his belief that Arsenal could remain the whole season undefeated: (Note: Before the season commenced, Wenger told reporters: "Nobody will finish above us in the league. It wouldn't surprise me if we were to go unbeaten for the whole of the season.")

It's not impossible as A.C. Milan once did it but I can't see why it's so shocking to say it. Do you think Manchester United, Liverpool or Chelsea don't dream that as well? They're exactly the same. They just don't say it because they're scared to look ridiculous, but nobody is ridiculous in this job as we know anything can happen.

"Somebody threw me a T-shirt after the trophy was presented which read 'Comical Wenger says we can go the whole season unbeaten.' I was just a season too early!"

— Arsène Wenger, May 2004

After breaking a Premier League record of 30 matches unbeaten, Arsenal lost to Everton in October 2002 (the decisive goal was struck in the last minute by Wayne Rooney, the first at senior level for the player who would go on to become England's record scorer), and failed to win their next three matches in all competitions, representing their worst run of form in 19 years. By March 2003, Arsenal had established themselves as league leaders, but nearest challenger Manchester United overhauled them to win the title. Arsenal finished the season with league wins against Southampton and Sunderland and were later consoled with success in the FA Cup – they beat the former team 1–0 in the 2003 final.

Wenger sought to strengthen his team with minor additions: goalkeeper Jens Lehmann, as well as a number of young players from academies abroad, namely Gaël Clichy and Phillipe Senderos. In comparison to their rivals Chelsea, bankrolled by new owner Roman Abramovich, and Manchester United, Arsenal's transfer activity was quiet. The financial constraints that came with the Ashburton Grove stadium project meant Wenger had little income to spend on new players. Once funding was found amidst the season, the club added to its roster, with José Antonio Reyes arriving in the winter transfer window.

In the 2003–04 season, Arsenal regained the Premier League without a single defeat. Over the 38 games played, their league record stood at 26 wins, 12 draws and no defeats. The unbeaten run came close to ending six matches into the campaign against Manchester United, as striker Ruud van Nistelrooy missed a penalty in injury time; the match then ended 0–0. At the turn of the calendar year, Arsenal won nine league matches in a row to consolidate first position; they secured their status as champions with a draw against local rivals Tottenham Hotspur in April 2004. Their form did not continue into the domestic cups; Arsenal exited the semi-final stage of the Football League Cup and the FA Cup to eventual winners Middlesbrough and Manchester United, respectively. In Europe, Arsenal lost two of their opening three UEFA Champions League group stage matches, 3–0 at home to Internazionale and 2–1 away to Dynamo Kyiv, but eventually finished top of the group. Arsenal ultimately reached the quarter-final stage of the Champions League, where they were eliminated by London rivals Chelsea.

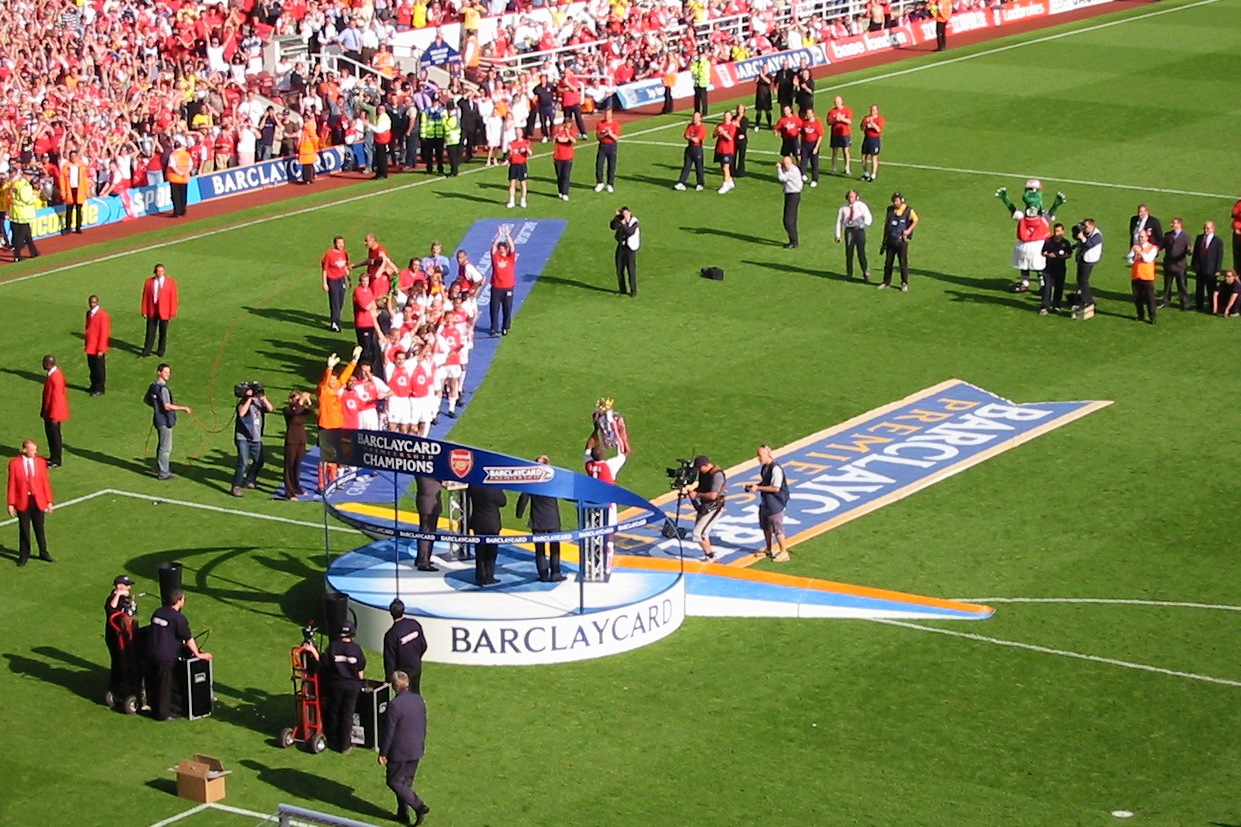
Arsenal captain Patrick Vieira presented with the trophy at Highbury on the final day of the season.

Continuing into the next season, a special gold version of the Premier League trophy was commissioned to commemorate Arsenal winning the title without a single defeat. In May 2018, this gold trophy was presented to Arsene Wenger as a gift from Arsenal Football Club at Wenger's final home game as manager after 22 years. In addition to their two wins at the end of the 2002–03 FA Premier League, Arsenal beat Middlesbrough in their second league game of 2004–05 to equal Nottingham Forest's record of 42 league matches unbeaten; the feat was eclipsed with a win at home to Blackburn Rovers. The run extended to six more matches for a total of 49 league games undefeated, before coming to an end with a controversial 2–0 defeat to Manchester United. The Guardian noted that Arsenal never trailed in the last 20 minutes of a game during their unbeaten run.

=== Formation ===

The most used Arsenal players in the 2003–04 season, positioned in a 4–4–1–1 formation

Of the players from Arsenal's double-winning side of 1998, only Patrick Vieira and Dennis Bergkamp remained as first team players throughout the unbeaten run; Martin Keown featured briefly, while Ray Parlour made 25 league appearances. Defenders Lee Dixon and Tony Adams had retired from professional football in 2002 and goalkeeper David Seaman joined Manchester City a year later. Kolo Touré, signed as a right-back and defensive midfielder, was chosen to play in central defence alongside Sol Campbell after impressing during pre-season. Lauren, who had played as a midfielder for Real Mallorca, was shifted to right-back when he joined Arsenal. Wenger initially replaced left-back Nigel Winterburn with Sylvinho, but an injury to the defender allowed Ashley Cole to take his place as first pick by the 2000–01 season. In midfield Gilberto Silva partnered Vieira, with Freddie Ljungberg and Robert Pires playing either side of them on the wings. Thierry Henry, signed as Nicolas Anelka's replacement in 1999, was the team's focal point in attack; he was supported most often by Bergkamp.

Although the team were interpreted as one who organised themselves in a 4–4–2, their formation with the ball was closer to a 4–4–1–1. Wenger's tactics emphasised attacking football and relied on movement and interchanging, with full-backs joining in attacks. Journalist Michael Cox noted that Arsenal's strengths lay on the left side of the pitch, and added that, because the opposition focused on containing Cole, Pires, and Henry, this allowed Lauren and Ljungberg to find space for crosses. Arsenal were also strong on the counter-attack, exemplified in their away performances against Leeds United and Tottenham Hotspur.

=== Matches ===
Premier League

Match	Date	Opponent	Venue	Result	Attendance	Scorers
1	7 May 2003	Southampton	H	6–1	38,052	Pires 8', 22', 46', Pennant 15', 18', 25'
2	11 May 2003	Sunderland	A	4–0	40,188	Henry 7', Ljungberg 39', 78', 88'
3	16 August 2003	Everton	H	2–1	38,014	Henry 35' (pen.), Pires 58'
4	24 August 2003	Middlesbrough	A	4–0	29,450	Henry 5', Gilberto Silva 13', Wiltord 22', 60'
5	27 August 2003	Aston Villa	H	2–0	38,010	Campbell 57', Henry 90'
6	31 August 2003	Manchester City	A	2–1	46,436	Wiltord 48', Ljungberg 72'
7	13 September 2003	Portsmouth	H	1–1	38,052	Henry 40' (pen.)
8	21 September 2003	Manchester United	A	0–0	67,639	
9	26 September 2003	Newcastle United	H	3–2	38,112	Henry 18', 80' (pen.), Gilberto Silva 67'
10	4 October 2003	Liverpool	A	2–1	44,374	Hyypiä 31' (o.g.), Pires 68'
11	18 October 2003	Chelsea	H	2–1	38,172	Edu 5', Henry 75'
12	26 October 2003	Charlton Athletic	A	1–1	26,660	Henry 39'
13	1 November 2003	Leeds United	A	4–1	36,491	Henry 8', 33', Pires 18', Gilberto Silva 50'
14	8 November 2003	Tottenham Hotspur	H	2–1	38,101	Pires 69', Ljungberg 79'
15	22 November 2003	Birmingham City	A	3–0	29,588	Ljungberg 4', Bergkamp 80', Pires 88'
16	30 November 2003	Fulham	H	0–0	38,063	
17	6 December 2003	Leicester City	A	1–1	26,660	Gilberto Silva 60'
18	14 December 2003	Blackburn Rovers	H	1–0	37,677	Bergkamp 11'
19	20 December 2003	Bolton Wanderers	A	1–1	28,003	Pires 57'
20	26 December 2003	Wolverhampton Wanderers	H	3–0	38,003	Craddock 13' (o.g.), Henry 20', 89'
21	29 December 2003	Southampton	A	1–0	32,151	Pires 13'
22	7 January 2004	Everton	A	1–1	38,726	Kanu 29'
23	10 January 2004	Middlesbrough	H	4–1	38,117	Henry 38' (pen.), Queudrue 45' (o.g.), Pires 57', Ljungberg 68'
24	18 January 2004	Aston Villa	A	2–0	39,380	Henry 29', 53' (pen.)
25	1 February 2004	Manchester City	H	2–1	38,103	Tarnat 37' (o.g.), Henry 83'
26	7 February 2004	Wolverhampton Wanderers	A	3–1	29,392	Bergkamp 9', Henry 58', Touré 63'
27	10 February 2004	Southampton	H	2–0	38,007	Henry 31', 90'
28	21 February 2004	Chelsea	A	2–1	41,847	Vieira 15', Edu 21'
29	28 February 2004	Charlton Athletic	H	2–1	38,137	Pires 2', Henry 4'
30	13 March 2004	Blackburn Rovers	A	2–0	28,627	Henry 57', Pires 87'
31	20 March 2004	Bolton Wanderers	H	2–1	38,053	Pires 16', Bergkamp 24'
32	28 March 2004	Manchester United	H	1–1	38,184	Henry 50'
33	9 April 2004	Liverpool	H	4–2	38,119	Henry 31', 50', 78', Pires 49'
34	11 April 2004	Newcastle United	A	0–0	52,141	
35	16 April 2004	Leeds United	H	5–0	38,094	Pires 6', Henry 27', 33' (pen.), 50', 67'
36	25 April 2004	Tottenham Hotspur	A	2–2	36,097	Vieira 3', Pires 35'
37	1 May 2004	Birmingham City	H	0–0	38,061	
38	4 May 2004	Portsmouth	A	1–1	20,140	Reyes 50'
39	9 May 2004	Fulham	A	1–0	18,102	Reyes 9'
40	15 May 2004	Leicester City	H	2–1	38,419	Henry 47' (pen.), Vieira 66'
41	15 August 2004	Everton	A	4–1	35,521	Bergkamp 23', Reyes 39', Ljungberg 54', Pires 83'
42	22 August 2004	Middlesbrough	H	5–3	37,415	Henry 25', 90', Bergkamp 54', Reyes 65', Pires 65'
43	25 August 2004	Blackburn Rovers	H	3–0	37,496	Henry 50', Gilberto Silva 58', Reyes 79'
44	28 August 2004	Norwich City	A	4–1	23,944	Reyes 22', Henry 36', Pires 40', Bergkamp 90'
45	11 September 2004	Fulham	A	3–0	21,681	Ljungberg 62', Knight 65' (o.g.), Reyes 71'
46	18 September 2004	Bolton Wanderers	H	2–2	37,010	Henry 31', Pires 66'
47	25 September 2004	Manchester City	A	1–0	47,015	Cole 14'
48	2 October 2004	Charlton Athletic	H	4–0	38,103	Ljungberg 33', Henry 48', 69', Reyes 70'
49	16 October 2004	Aston Villa	H	3–1	38,137	Pires 19', 72', Henry 45'

== See also ==
- 1888–89 FA Cup
- 1888–89 Football League
- 1889 World Championship (football)
- 2004–05 UEFA Champions League
- 2004 FA Community Shield
- Perfect season
- Longest unbeaten runs
- The Invincibles (disambiguation)
