= Preston North End F.C. 26–0 Hyde F.C. =

Extreme score in association football from 15 October 1887

- Event: 1887–88 FA Cup
Preston North End	Hyde
26	0
- Date: 15 October 1887
- Venue: Deepdale, Preston
- Referee: R. G. Barlow
- Attendance: 2,000
- Weather: Fine

Preston North End 26–0 Hyde is the result of an FA Cup first round tie between Preston North End and Hyde of Manchester, which took place on 15 October 1887. It holds the largest margin of victory in an English football match at FA Cup or League level.

== Background ==
The FA Cup was the leading competition in English football before the creation of the Football League. The competition was open to every member club of the Football Association, and the 1887–88 FA Cup was the last time that there were no qualifying rounds. The early rounds were drawn on a geographical basis, with no seeding for ability, which could lead to some imbalanced ties; the first round in the previous season's tournament had seen five double-figure wins.

Preston North End was the leading English club of the time and a favourite to lift the FA Cup. Preston, overt in their overwhelming use of professional footballers, were one of the members of the British Football Association (BFA), which was set up with the goal of normalising and legalising professionalism. The threat of the BFA led the FA to change its rules to allow professionals to play in the FA Cup, albeit under certain restrictions. In 1886–87, Preston had reached the semi-final of the FA Cup, and won the next-most prestigious tournament it could enter, the Lancashire Senior Cup, by beating Bolton Wanderers 3–0 in the final. Preston had eliminated the FA Cup holders, Blackburn Rovers, in the first round.

Hyde had been formed in 1885 and, unlike Preston, was not a fully professional outfit; the 1887–88 competition was the club's first entry to the FA Cup; it did not enter the Lancashire Cup. It had had some experience of playing bigger sides, and had also played Blackburn Rovers in 1886–87, albeit losing 8–0.

== 1886–87 season ==
Preston started the season with friendly wins over Halliwell and Nottingham Forest, although the club suffered a blow when the FA ruled that goalkeeper James Trainer, who had recently joined from Bolton Wanderers, was not eligible for the competition.

Hyde strengthened by signing a number of new players - Pressdee from West Manchester, Bowers from Derby County, and Bunyan and Gregory from Spital. It opened its season with an ambitious friendly against Bolton Wanderers, in front of 3,000 people at Hyde, and the visitors duly won 8–1. However Hyde restored pride a week later with a 4–1 win over Gorton Villa.

149 clubs entered the FA Cup, and both Preston and Hyde were put in the third division, with 14 other clubs from west Lancashire and Manchester; the only other club of note in the division was Bolton Wanderers. The tie was the fifth to be drawn from the division.

== The game ==
Preston had tried to buy Hyde off from the tie, but Hyde refused, which led to Preston vowing to break the English record (which stood at 23–0, by which score Witton beat Liverpool Stanley in the Lancashire Cup in 1882); the Manchester media expressed scepticism that Preston could even reach half that total.

Preston fielded almost an entire first-choice XI for the game, with Addison in goal as the main change, and the experienced Goodall stepped back to replace Bethell Robinson, who was on the sick list, in midfield, Sammy Thomson returning to the front line after injury. Hyde fielded the same side which had been beaten by Bolton, other than Hopkinson on the wing in place of Ashworth.

The match kicked off at 3.30, and Preston scored after just two minutes, Dewhurst heading home a Jimmy Ross corner. Bunyan saved a couple of shots before the second goal, after 12 minutes, when Thomson crossed the ball close to a post and Drummond touched home. After the third goal, Bowers left the pitch with a sprained arm, and, in those days of no substitutes, Hyde had to play for half-an-hour before half-time with 10 men. Hyde did not make Addison do any work until 25 minutes, by which time the home side was already 4–0 up.

The score at half-time was 12–0, and Preston permitted a reserve player to replace Bowers. Hyde started the second half with a strong move up the right wing, but Preston won the ball back and broke, Thomson scoring the 13th goal. Soon afterwards, Hyde had its only shot all match, which went wide, and straight from Addison's goal-kick Thomson made it 14. The final 11 goals came in something of a rush, all in the final half-an-hour, Goodall finishing off the scoring.

== Aftermath ==
Preston reached the 1888 FA Cup final, but lost to West Bromwich Albion; it was the club's only defeat of the season. Nevertheless, the bulk of the side won the 1888–89 Football League and Cup without losing a match.

Hyde did not enter the FA Cup again until 1906; its biggest win in the competition was 5–0 against Tonge in the first qualifying round in 1908–09. In the meantime it had a couple of abortive efforts to enter local leagues, before settling into the Lancashire Combination. The club broke up during the First World War and was replaced in the town by Hyde United.

== Match details ==
15 October 1887

Preston North End	26–0	Hyde
J. Ross 7'; Gordon 5'; Thompson 5'; Dewhurst 3'; Drummond 2'; Graham; Goodall; Russell; N. Ross

Deepdale
Referee: R. G. Barlow (Manchester)

Preston	Hyde

GK	Addison
DF	Bob Howarth
DF	Nick Ross
MF	John Goodall
MF	David Russell
MF	Johnny Graham
RW	Jack Gordon
RW	Jimmy Ross
FW	Sammy Thomson
LW	Fred Dewhurst
LW	George Drummond
Manager:
William Sudell

GK	Bunyan
DF	Gregory
DF	J. H. Hall
MF	Hurst
MF	Bowers (sub. Knowles 45')
MF	Wilson
RW	Jos. Hall
RW	Pressdee
CF	Robinson
LW	Wood
LW	Hopkinson
Secretary:	J. Halleworth
