= 1889 World Championship (football) =

- Event: Football World Championship
Third Lanark	Preston North End
(Scotland)	(England)
3	3
- Date: 3 October 1889
- Venue: Cathkin Park, Glasgow
- Referee: Aitken
- Attendance: 6,000
- Weather: Cloudy

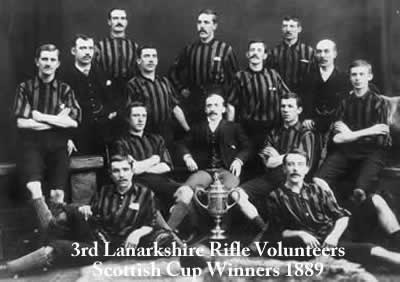
Third Lanark

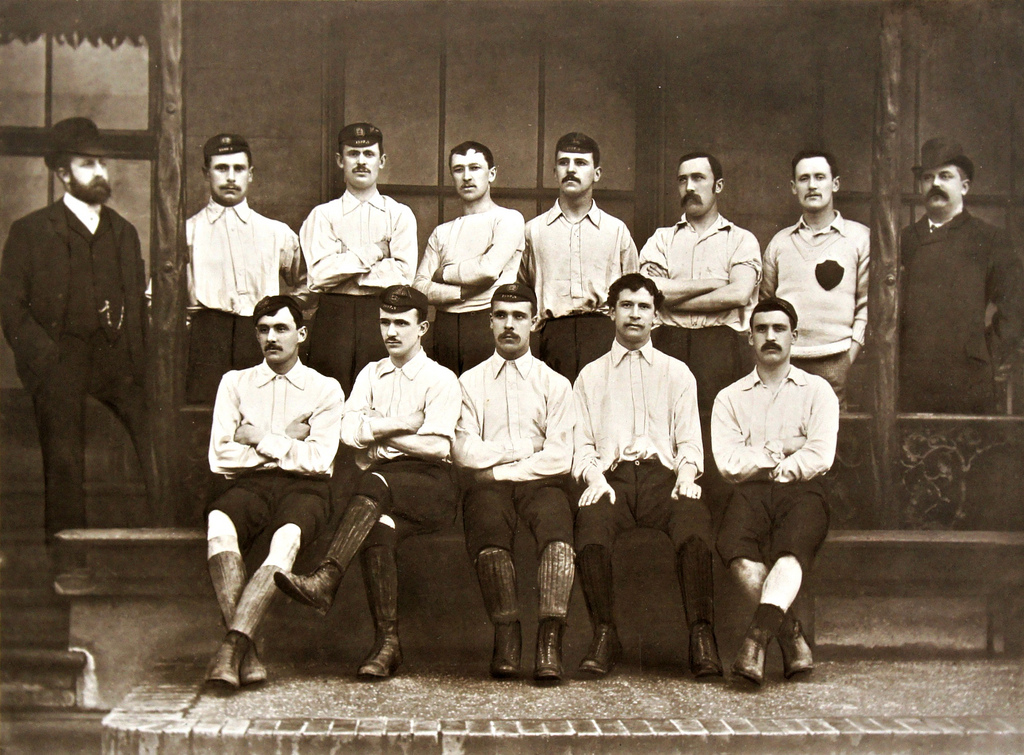
Preston North End

The 1889 World Championship was an exhibition football match that took place in Glasgow, Scotland, on 3 October 1889 between the winners of the Scottish Cup, Third Lanark (then known as 3rd Lanarkshire Rifle Volunteers), and the English Double winners of the Football League and FA Cup, Preston North End. The match finished 3–3, although Third Lanark took a 2–0 lead into half time.

The Football World Championship had always been contested between the victors of the national cups of England and Scotland, which were the eminent club football competitions in the world at the time. The Football League in England was established in 1888–89 but it only consisted of clubs from the North and Midlands during its formative years. Nonetheless, Preston went through the inaugural season unbeaten and won the championship, earning the nickname "The Invincibles". They further asserted their dominance by winning that season's FA Cup. The Scottish Football League wouldn't be founded until 1890–91.

An attendance of 6,000 was reported at Third Lanark's Cathkin Park for the spectacle. Among the crowd were the players of Blackburn Rovers, Preston's Lancashire rivals – who played Celtic, Third Lanark's Glasgow rivals, at Celtic Park that same day. The local newspaper The Glasgow Herald reported on the two matches in equal detail and prominence as bank holiday cross-border challenge matches with no particular attention given to the fact that Thirds v Preston was a contest between the cup-holders, although the previous year's fixture at the same venue between Renton and West Bromwich Albion was given far greater attention in the same publication.

== Participant teams ==
Team	Qualification
(Scotland) Third Lanark	1888–89 Scottish Cup winners
(England) Preston North End	1888–89 FA Cup winners

== Match details ==
1889 Football World Championship
3 October 1889

Third Lanark (Scotland)	3–3	(England) Preston North End
Scott 10'; Johnstone		Holmes 47'; N. Ross 50'; J. Ross 87'

Cathkin Park, Glasgow
Attendance: 6,000
Referee: Aitken

Third Lanark
Preston North End

GK	(Scotland) Robert Downie
FB	(Scotland) Andrew Thomson
FB	(Scotland) John Rae
HB	(Scotland) John Hill (Note: Guest player (Hill and McPherson from Heart of Midlothian, Scott from Airdrieonians).)
HB	(Scotland) Alex Lochhead
HB	(Scotland) John McPherson
FW	(Scotland) John Marshall
FW	(Scotland) William Lapsley
FW	(Scotland) John Morrison
FW	(Scotland) William Johnstone
FW	(Scotland) Robert Scott

GK	(Wales) James Trainer
FB	(England) Bob Howarth
FB	(England) Bob Holmes
HB	(Scotland) Bob Kelso
HB	(Scotland) David Russell
HB	(Scotland) Johnny Graham
FW	(Scotland) Jack Gordon
FW	(Scotland) Jimmy Ross
FW	(Scotland) Nick Ross
FW	(Scotland) Sam Thomson
FW	(Scotland) George Drummond
