= 1889–90 Preston North End F.C. season =

English football club season

Preston North End
1889–90 season
- Manager: E.H. Bahr
- Stadium: Deepdale
- Football League: 1st
- FA Cup: 3rd Round
- Top goalscorer: League: Nick Ross (22); All: Nick Ross (24)
Home colours

The 1889–90 season was Preston North End's second season in the Football League. The club entered the season as double defending champions, having won both the league and FA Cup titles the previous season. Although the Bolton Wanderers eliminated them from the cup, a successive league title was assured on the final day. With the Lilywhites holding off the challenges of Everton and the Blackburn Rovers.

In the former top tier of English football, home and away Christmas Day and Boxing Day double headers were often played allowing many working people their only chance to watch a game guaranteeing football clubs large crowds. Preston North End faced Aston Villa on Christmas Day 1889.

== Final league table ==
Pos	Team	Pld	W	D	L	GF	GA	GAv	Pts	Relegation
1	Preston North End (C)	22	15	3	4	71	30	2.367	33	
2	Everton	22	14	3	5	65	40	1.625	31	
3	Blackburn Rovers	22	12	3	7	78	41	1.902	27	
4	Wolverhampton Wanderers	22	10	5	7	51	38	1.342	25	
5	West Bromwich Albion	22	11	3	8	47	50	0.940	25	
6	Accrington	22	9	6	7	53	56	0.946	24	
7	Derby County	22	9	3	10	43	55	0.782	21	
8	Aston Villa	22	7	5	10	43	51	0.843	19	
9	Bolton Wanderers	22	9	1	12	54	65	0.831	19	
10	Notts County	22	6	5	11	43	51	0.843	17	Re-elected
11	Burnley	22	4	5	13	36	65	0.554	13	Re-elected
12	Stoke (R)	22	3	4	15	27	69	0.391	10	Failed re-election and demoted to the Football Alliance

Source: World Football
Rules for classification: 1) Points; 2) Goal average; 3) Goals scored
(C) Champions; (R) Relegated

== Results ==
=== Football League ===
14 September 1889 1	Preston North End	10–0	Stoke	Preston
	Thomson 5'; Drummond; J. Ross 20'; J. Ross; N. Ross; N. Ross; N. Ross; Thomson; Russell; Drummond			Stadium: Deepdale; Attendance: 5,000 - 7,000

21 September 1889 2	Aston Villa	5–3	Preston North End	Perry Barr
				Stadium: Wellington Road

28 September 1889 3	Burnley	0–3	Preston North End	Burnley
				Stadium: Turf Moor

5 October 1889 4	Preston North End	5–0	West Bromwich Albion	Preston
				Stadium: Deepdale

12 October 1889 5	Bolton Wanderers	2–6	Preston North End	Bolton
				Stadium: Pike's Lane

19 October 1889 6	Derby County	2–1	Preston North End	Derby
				Stadium: Racecourse Ground

26 October 1889 7	Preston North End	0–2	Wolverhampton Wanderers	Preston
				Stadium: Deepdale

2 November 1889 8	Blackburn Rovers	3–4	Preston North End	Blackburn
				Stadium: Ewood Park

9 November 1889 9	Preston North End	3–1	Accrington	Preston
				Stadium: Deepdale

11 November 1889 10	Stoke	1–2	Preston North End	Stoke-on-Trent
				Stadium: Victoria Ground

16 November 1889 11	Everton	1–5	Preston North End	Anfield
				Stadium: Anfield

23 November 1889 12	Preston North End	3–1	Bolton Wanderers	Preston
				Stadium: Deepdale

30 November 1889 13	Preston North End	6–0	Burnley	Preston
				Stadium: Deepdale

7 December 1889 14	Preston North End	1–1	Blackburn Rovers	Preston
				Stadium: Deepdale

21 December 1889 15	Preston North End	1–2	Everton	Preston
				Stadium: Deepdale

25 December 1889 16	Preston North End	3–2	Aston Villa	Preston, Lancashire
				Stadium: Deepdale

26 December 1889 17	West Bromwich Albion	2–2	Preston North End	West Bromwich
				Stadium: Stoney Lane

4 January 1890 18	Wolverhampton Wanderers	0–1	Preston North End	Wolverhampton
				Stadium: Molineux Stadium

11 January 1890 19	Preston North End	5–0	Derby County	Preston
				Stadium: Deepdale

1 March 1890 20	Preston North End	4–3	Notts County	Preston
				Stadium: Deepdale

15 March 1890 21	Accrington	2–2	Preston North End	Accrington
				Stadium: Thorneyholme Road

27 March 1890 22	Notts County	0–1	Preston North End	West Bridgford
				Stadium: Trent Bridge

=== FA Cup ===
18 January 1890 First round	Preston North End	6–1	Newton Heath	Preston
				Stadium: Deepdale

1 February 1890 Second round	Preston North End	4–0	Lincoln City	Preston
				Stadium: Deepdale

15 February 1890 Third round	Preston North End	2–3	Bolton Wanderers	Preston
				Stadium: Deepdale

== Players ==
Preston's squad for the 1889–90 season.

Note: Flags indicate national team as defined under FIFA eligibility rules; some limited exceptions apply. Players may hold more than one non-FIFA nationality.

Pos.	Nation	Player
GK	WAL	James Trainer
DF	SCO	George Drummond
DF	ENG	Robert Holmes
DF	ENG	Bob Howarth
MF	SCO	Johnny Graham
MF	SCO	Bob Kelso
FW	ENG	Fred Dewhurst
FW	SCO	Jack Gordon
FW	SCO	Jimmy Ross
FW	SCO	Nick Ross
