= 1888–89 Football League =

1st season of the Football League

The Football League
- Season: 1888–89
- Champions: Preston North End; 1st English title
- Matches: 132
- Goals: 586 (4.44 per match)
- Top goalscorer: John Goodall (21 goals)
- Biggest home win: Aston Villa 9–1 Notts County (29 September 1888)
- Biggest away win: Notts County 0–7 Preston North End (3 November 1888)
- Highest scoring: Blackburn Rovers 5–5 Accrington (15 September 1888); Aston Villa 9–1 Notts County (29 September 1888); Bolton Wanderers 7–3 Notts County (9 March 1889)
- Longest winning run: 6 matches Preston North End
- Longest unbeaten run: 22 matches Preston North End
- Longest losing run: 8 matches Derby County

The 1888–89 Football League was the first season of the Football League, which ran from the autumn of 1888 until the spring of 1889. Created and named in Manchester during a meeting on 17 April 1888, the Football League is the oldest professional association football league competition in the world.

The season began on 8 September 1888 with 12 member clubs from the Midlands and North of England: Accrington, Aston Villa, Blackburn Rovers, Bolton Wanderers, Burnley, Derby County, Everton, Notts County, Preston North End, Stoke, West Bromwich Albion and Wolverhampton Wanderers. Each club played the other twice, once at home and once away. The season concluded on 20 April 1889, with Preston crowned as the first league champions; they were also never defeated throughout the season, a very rare achievement that has only been replicated in England once since then, when Arsenal won the Premier League in the 2003–04 season.

The original league rules stated that teams' positions should be calculated "from wins, draws, and losses", without further detail. It was not until late November that a points system was decided upon, with teams being awarded two points for a win and one point for a draw. Goal average was used to separate teams level on points.

== League table ==
The league rules stated that the bottom four clubs were obliged to retire and seek re-election at the Annual General Meeting (AGM) along with any other clubs wishing to become League members. Stoke, Burnley, Derby County, and Notts County were all re-elected for the 1889–90 season.

Pos	Team	Pld	W	D	L	GF	GA	GAv	Pts	Qualification
1	Preston North End (C)	22	18	4	0	74	15	4.933	40	
2	Aston Villa	22	12	5	5	61	43	1.419	29	
3	Wolverhampton Wanderers	22	12	4	6	51	37	1.378	28	
4	Blackburn Rovers	22	10	6	6	66	45	1.467	26	
5	Bolton Wanderers	22	10	2	10	63	59	1.068	22	
6	West Bromwich Albion	22	10	2	10	40	46	0.870	22	
7	Accrington	22	6	8	8	48	48	1.000	20	
8	Everton	22	9	2	11	35	47	0.745	20	
9	Burnley	22	7	3	12	42	62	0.677	17	Re-elected
10	Derby County	22	7	2	13	41	61	0.672	16	Re-elected
11	Notts County	22	5	2	15	40	73	0.548	12	Re-elected
12	Stoke	22	4	4	14	26	51	0.510	12	Re-elected

Source: World Football
Rules for classification: 1) Points; 2) Goal average; 3) Goals scored
(C) Champions

== Results ==
Home \ Away	ACC	AVL	BLA	BOL	BUR	DER	EVE	NTC	PNE	STK	WBA	WOL
Accrington	—	1–1	0–2	2–3	5–1	6–2	3–1	1–2	0–0	2–0	2–1	4–4
Aston Villa	4–3	—	6–1	6–2	4–2	4–2	2–1	9–1	0–2	5–1	2–0	2–1
Blackburn Rovers	5–5	5–1	—	4–4	4–2	3–0	3–0	5–2	2–2	5–2	6–2	2–2
Bolton Wanderers	4–1	2–3	3–2	—	3–4	3–6	6–2	7–3	2–5	2–1	1–2	2–1
Burnley	2–2	4–0	1–7	4–1	—	1–0	2–2	1–0	2–2	2–1	2–0	0–4
Derby County	1–1	5–2	0–2	2–3	1–0	—	2–4	3–2	2–3	2–1	1–2	3–0
Everton	2–1	2–0	3–1	2–1	3–2	6–2	—	2–1	0–2	2–1	1–4	1–2
Notts County	3–3	2–4	3–3	0–4	6–1	3–5	3–1	—	0–7	0–3	2–1	3–0
Preston North End	2–0	1–1	1–0	3–1	5–2	5–0	3–0	4–1	—	7–0	3–0	5–2
Stoke	2–4	1–1	2–1	2–2	4–3	1–1	0–0	3–0	0–3	—	0–2	0–1
West Bromwich Albion	2–2	3–3	2–1	1–5	4–3	5–0	1–0	4–2	0–5	2–0	—	1–3
Wolverhampton Wanderers	4–0	1–1	2–2	3–2	4–1	4–1	4–0	2–1	0–4	4–1	2–1	—

Source: The Rec.Sport.Soccer Statistics Foundation
Legend: Blue = home team win; Yellow = draw; Red = away team win.

== Team locations ==
Locations of the Football League 1888–89 teams

== Individual statistics ==
Taken from Fußball-Weltzeitschrift, a journal of the International Federation of Football History & Statistics.

=== Top scorers ===
Rank	Nationality	Scorer	Club	Goals	Matches played	Goals per match
1	England	John Goodall	Preston North End	21	21	1.00
2	Scotland	James D. Ross	Preston North End	18	21	0.86
3	England	Albert Allen	Aston Villa	17	21	0.81
4	England	John Southworth	Blackburn Rovers	16	21	0.76
4	England	Harry Wood	Wolverhampton Wanderers	16	17	0.94
6	England	Thomas Green	Aston Villa	14	21	0.67
7	Scotland	James Brogan	Bolton Wanderers	13	22	0.59
7	England	David Weir	Bolton Wanderers	13	22	0.59
9	England	Frederick Dewhurst	Preston North End	12	17	0.71
9	England	Herbert L. Fecitt	Blackburn Rovers	12	17	0.71
9	Scotland	Billy Barbour	Accrington	12	19	0.63
9	Scotland	Sandy Higgins	Derby County	12	21	0.57
9	England	Thomas Pearson	West Bromwich Albion	12	22	0.55

=== Best goalkeepers ===
Rank	Goalie	Club	Matches played	Goals conceded	Goals conceded per match
1	(Wales) James Trainer	Preston North End	20	13	0.65

== Preston North End's champion squad ==
Preston North End's champion squad were known as The Invincibles.

Player	Position	Matches played	Goals
(England) John Goodall	Centre-forward	22	21
(Scotland) James D. Ross	Inside right	21	18
(England) Frederick Dewhurst	Inside left	16	12
(England) Robert Holmes	Left back	22	0
(England) Robert Howarth	Right back	18	0
(Scotland) George Drummond	Utility player (including Goalkeeper)	12	1
(Scotland) Johnny Graham	Left half	22	0
(Scotland) Jack Gordon	Right winger	20	10
(Scotland) Samuel Thompson	Forward (Left wing among others)	16	3
(England) William Graham	Centre half	5	0
(England) Richard Whittle	Defender	1	1
(England) Jack Edwards	Forward	4	3
(Scotland) Jock Inglis	Forward	1	1
(Ireland) Archibald Goodall	Inside left	2	1
(Scotland) Sandy Robertson	Right half	21	3
(Scotland) David Russell	Centre half	18	0
(Wales) James Trainer	Goalkeeper	20	0
(Wales) Dr Robert Mills-Roberts	Goalkeeper	2	0
Total matches/goals		22	74

== Summary ==
=== 8 September 1888: Opening day ===
Ten of the twelve teams took part in the first ever round of Championship fixtures on Saturday, 8 September 1888 and although no league table was published in any of the newspapers of the time, West Bromwich Albion would have been the very first table-toppers. Albion won 2–0 at Stoke in front of 4,500 spectators and would have been above Preston North End, Derby County and Everton by virtue of an infinite Goal Average as they kept a clean sheet. Goal Average was the number of goals scored divided by the number of goals conceded. Goal Average was used to separate teams who were tied on points at that time. Preston defeated Burnley 5–2, Derby were 6–3 winners at Bolton and Everton secured the points in a 2–1 victory over Accrington. Aston Villa defender Gershom Cox was thought to have earned the distinction of scoring the first ever league goal, with an unfortunate own goal in a 1–1 draw with Wolverhampton Wanderers, and Fred Dewhurst opening the scoring minutes later at Preston with the first intentional goal. However, the post-match reports of relative kick-off times show most games were delayed allowing for crowds to assemble. A goal by England and Bolton winger Kenny Davenport two minutes into the match against Derby County was scored comfortably before any other and is now regarded as the first ever football league goal. Neither Blackburn Rovers or Notts County played on the opening weekend. Preston North End would go unbeaten and win the league

=== September and October ===
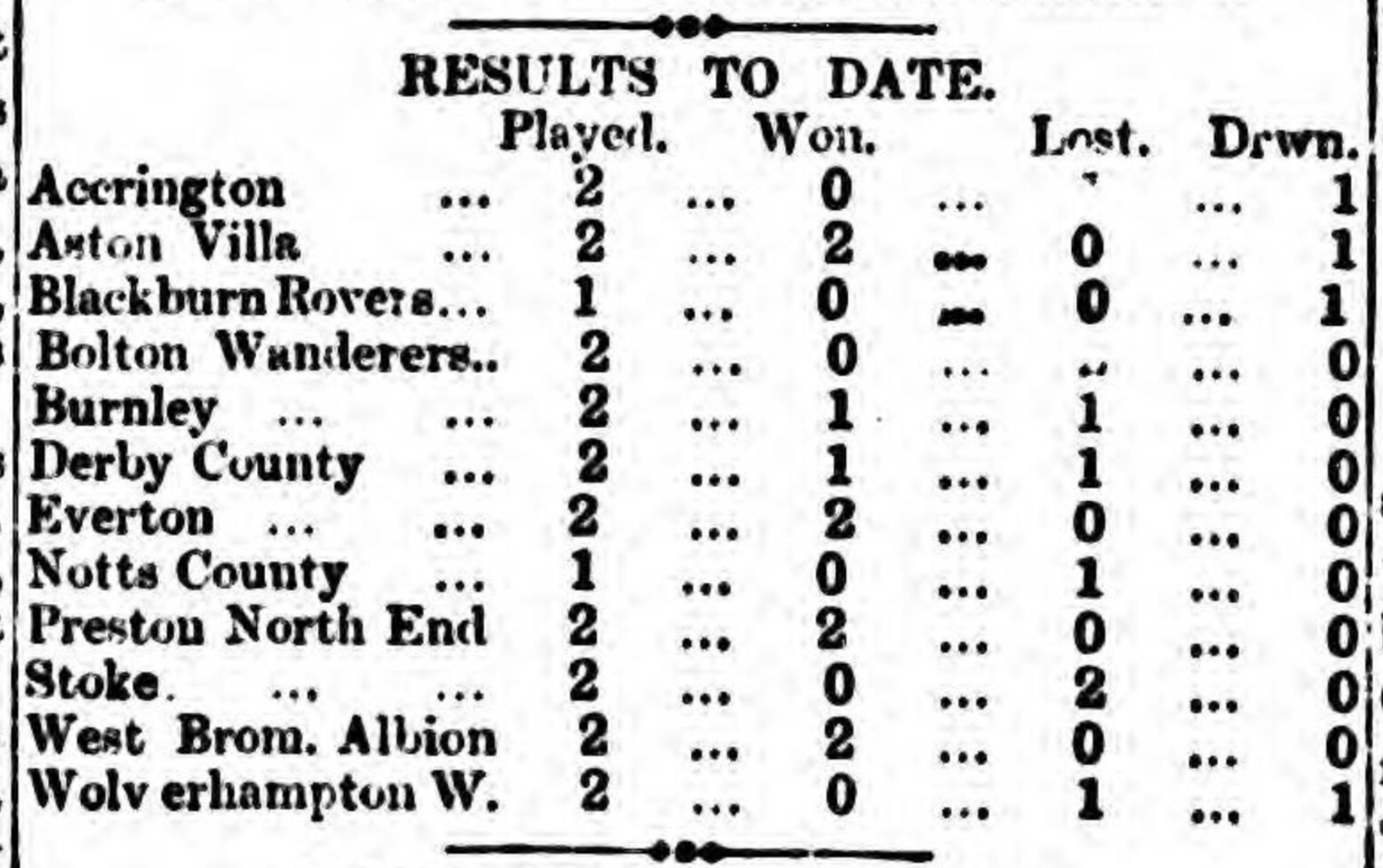
League table published in Cricket and Football Field on 15 September. Since the points system had not yet been introduced, the teams were listed in alphabetical order.

Preston North End took over from West Bromwich Albion at the top of the table in their second game on Saturday 15 September 1888 when they won 4–0 at Wolverhampton Wanderers with Archie Goodall scoring on his Preston debut. Albion also won 2–1 at Derby County but the victory gave them an inferior goal average while Everton were the only other club to secure maximum points from their opening two games. Both Blackburn Rovers and Notts County made their respective football league debuts. Rovers were held 5–5 by Accrington while Notts County lost 1–2 at Everton.

By 22 September, a 2–6 defeat for West Bromwich Albion at Blackburn Rovers and a 1–2 defeat for Everton at Aston Villa left Preston as the only team with a 100% record after three games when they defeated Bolton Wanderers 3–1 at Deepdale. Stoke recorded their first ever league victory 3–0 over Notts County, who themselves replaced Stoke at the foot of the table. County had lost both their opening two fixtures while Bolton had yet to secure a point from three. Preston's 100% record was maintained when they won 3–2 at Derby County on 29 September while second placed Aston Villa set a record victory up to that time when they defeated bottom club Notts County 9–1. Bolton recorded their first ever league victory at the fourth attempt, 6–2 against Everton.

On 6 October, Richard Whittle marked his Preston debut with a goal in their 7–0 victory over Stoke to take their perfect start to five games. Their lead at the top was doubled to two points when Aston Villa suffered their first defeat of the season 0–2 at Everton. West Bromwich Albion moved up to second after beating Derby County 5–0 while Notts County secured their first ever point at the fourth attempt in a 3–3 draw with Blackburn Rovers yet remained at the foot of the table.

On 13 October, West Bromwich Albion visited Deepdale for the first ever league clash between teams occupying the top two positions at kick off. Albion trailed Preston by two points and required a six-goal victory to overtake the leaders on goal average but Preston stretched their perfect start to six games with a 3–0 victory. Aston Villa moved back into second place, three points behind Preston on the same day when they defeated Blackburn Rovers 6–1. Notts County became the last team to secure a victory when they defeated Everton 3–1 in what was their fifth game. Accrington became the first team to gain a point against Preston when they held the league leaders to a 0–0 draw on 20 October, their seventh game of the season. Aston Villa won 3–2 at Bolton to reduce Preston's lead to two points.

On 27 October, Preston North End extended their unbeaten start to the season to eight games when they defeated Wolverhampton Wanderers 5–2 at Deepdale with John Goodall scoring a hat-trick. Alex McKinnon earned the distinction of being the first player to score a league hat-trick for Everton in their 6–2 victory over Derby County who fell to the bottom of the league as a result of a sensational 6–1 victory for Notts County over Burnley. Blackburn Rovers also enjoyed a comprehensive 5–2 victory over Stoke to climb to sixth in the table.

=== November ===
Preston stretched their unbeaten start to the season to nine games when Jack Gordon and John Goodall both scored hat-tricks in a 7–0 victory at Notts County. This was Goodall's second hat-trick in consecutive games and took Preston three points clear of Aston Villa who were held 1–1 at Stoke. Blackburn Rovers also scored seven goals away from home at Burnley, who did manage a goal in reply. When Aston Villa visited Preston North End on 10 November, it was both teams' tenth game and the second time that two teams had played a fixture while occupying the top two positions in the league. Villa went into the game trailing Preston by three points but a 1–1 draw maintained the status quo. Aston Villa were the only team to stop Preston North End winning every home game this season. The Villa also went on to win every home game except one which was against Preston.

Preston completed the first half of their programme unbeaten when they won 3–0 at Stoke in the only fixture played on Monday 12 November. Ross, Thomson, Robertson scored for them. The result took Preston five points clear of second placed Aston Villa who held one game in hand. Preston increased their lead to seven points with a 2–0 defeat of Accrington while Aston Villa were beaten 1–5 at Blackburn Rovers. Blackburn Rovers completed a run of five straight victories when they won 2–0 at bottom club Derby to move into third place, eight points behind leaders Preston whose unbeaten start increased to thirteen games with a 5–2 victory at Bolton.

=== December and January ===
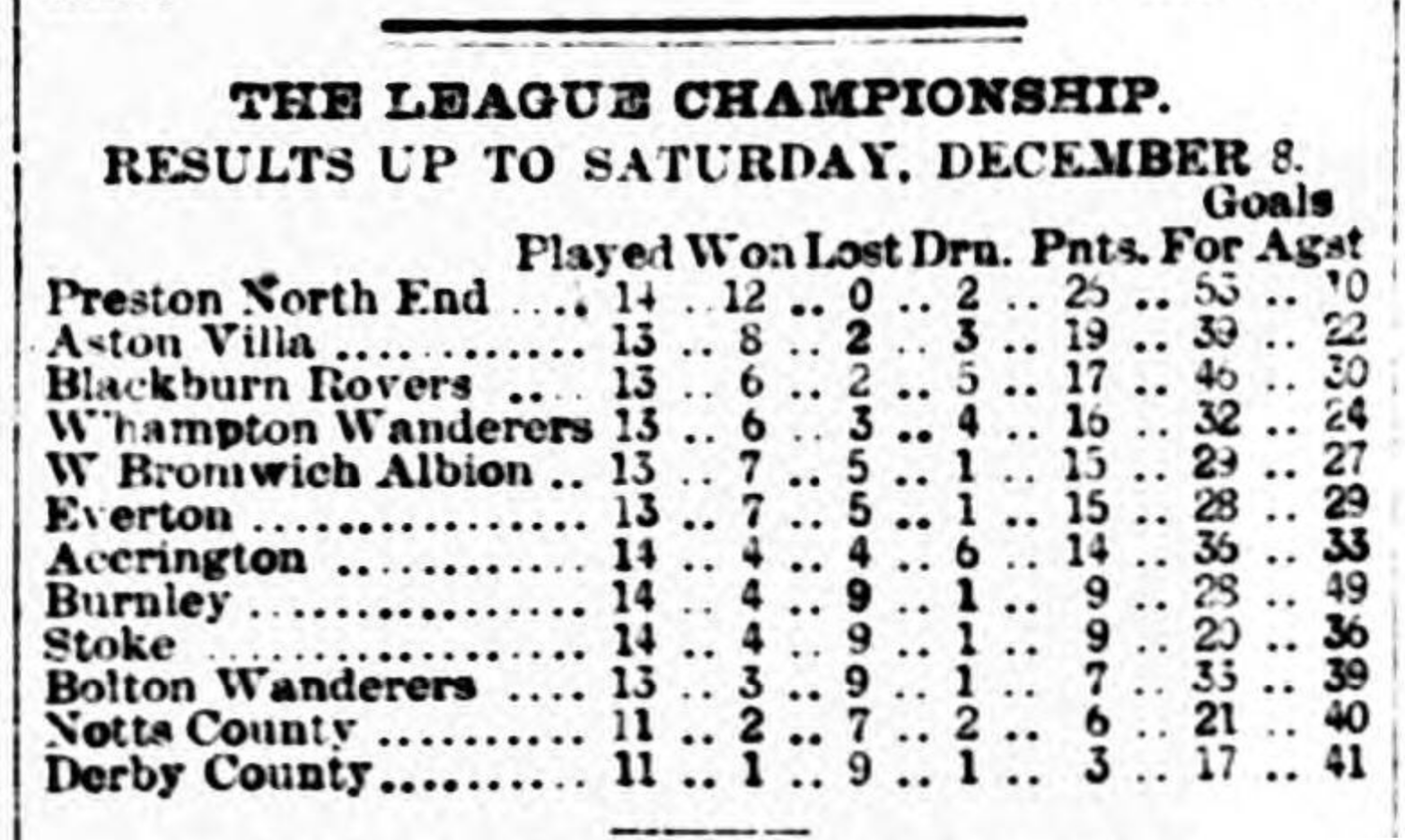
By December, the points system had been introduced

Bottom club Derby travelled to unbeaten league leaders Preston having not won in nine games, the last seven of which had all ended in defeat. Jock Inglis made his Preston debut and scored in their 5–0 victory. Preston North End were held to a draw for only the third time at the fifteenth attempt, 2–2 at Burnley. Their nearest challengers, Aston Villa were unable to make any impact into the seven-point deficit though as they too were held 1–1 at Accrington. Preston's 3–0 defeat of Everton at Deepdale took their unbeaten start to the season to sixteen games.

League leaders Preston travelled to West Bromwich Albion on Boxing Day winning 5–0 and, with Aston Villa not playing, they established a nine-point lead having played two games more.

A 1–0 victory over Blackburn Rovers on 29 December took Preston North End into the new year still unbeaten with just four games remaining. Their first game of 1889 would be at home to Notts County in a game that would see them crowned champions of the inaugural league with three games to spare provided Aston Villa also lost at Burnley. Notts County arrived at Deepdale having failed to win in seven outings, the last five of which had all ended in defeat and rarely threatened as Preston ran out 4–1 winners in thickening fog. Aston Villa arrived at Burnley with just eight players, three of their team struggling to find the ground in the fog that had already arrived in the town before kick off. Having started the game three players short, two did emerge a few minutes into the game but they played most of the game with ten men and slumped to a 0–4 defeat, which saw Preston crowned champions. The Deepdale club remained unbeaten in their final three games to complete their league programme unbeaten.

== Attendances ==
Everton drew the highest average home attendance in the first edition of the Football League.

#	Football club	Home games	Average attendance
1	Everton	11	7,545
2	Preston North End	11	6,273
3	Blackburn Rovers	11	5,273
4	Bolton Wanderers	11	5,273
5	Aston Villa	11	5,182
6	Burnley	11	4,500
7	Notts County	11	3,909
8	West Bromwich Albion	11	3,833
9	Stoke	11	3,727
10	Wolverhampton Wanderers	11	3,727
11	Accrington	11	3,364
12	Derby County	11	3,045

== See also ==
- 1888–89 in English football
- 1888 in association football
- 1889 in association football
