= Joe Beverley =

English footballer (1856–1897)

Personal information
- Full name: Joseph Beverley
- Date of birth: 12 November 1856
- Place of birth: Blackburn, England
- Date of death: 21 May 1897 (aged 40)
- Place of death: Blackburn, England
- Position: Defender

Youth career
- James Street

Senior career*
Years	Team	Apps	(Gls)
1878–1882	Blackburn Olympic		
1882–1884	Blackburn Rovers		
1884–1887	Blackburn Olympic		
1887–1889	Blackburn Rovers	8	(0)

International career
1884	England	3	(0)
- * Club domestic league appearances and goals

Joseph Beverley (12 November 1856 – 21 May 1897) was an FA Cup-winning English footballer who played for Blackburn Olympic and Blackburn Rovers, as well as the England national side.

== Career ==
=== Club ===
Beverley started out with James Street and stayed with them when they merged with Black Star to form Blackburn Olympic. He moved to Blackburn Rovers in October 1882, winning the FA Cup in 1884. He then returned to Olympic before once again transferring to play for Rovers in 1887, meaning he was part of the squad that entered the first year of the Football League in 1888-89, after which he drew a close to his footballing career.

==== 1888-1889 ====
Joe Beverley made his League debut on 15 September 1888, as a full-back, at Leamington Road, then home of Blackburn Rovers, against Accrington. The match ended in a 5–5 draw. When Joe Beverley played as a full – back on 20 October 1888 against Wolverhampton Wanderers, he was 31 years 343 days old; that made him, on that seventh weekend of League football, Blackburn Rovers oldest player. Joe Beverley was supplanted by Thomas Midgley as the League's oldest player on 20 October 1888. Beverley had been the League' oldest player from 15 September 1888 (replacing Johnny Graham of Preston North End) until 20 October 1888. Beverley played eight, of the 22 League matches played by Blackburn Rovers in season 1888–89. As a full-back he played in a defence that achieved one clean sheet.

=== International ===
Beverley was selected to represent England at the inaugural British Home Championship in 1884 where he played in all three games, resulting in two wins and one loss, meaning England lost the round robin tournament to Scotland. His international career spanned a total of 23 days.

== Personal life ==
Beverley married Mary Ann Gabbott in 1877 and they had five children, the youngest born just weeks before Beverley was killed in an industrial accident at Albion Mill. He was 40 years old.
