= Thomas Midgley =

Thomas Midgley may refer to:

- Thomas Midgley (footballer) (1856–1957), English footballer
- Thomas Midgley Jr. (1889–1944), American chemist
