= 1888–89 in English football =

Football in England
- Season: 1888-89

Men's football
- Football League: Preston North End
- FA Cup: Preston North End

The 1888–89 season was the 18th season of competitive association football in England.

== Overview ==
A new competition, The Football League, started this season. The Football League was open to clubs all over the United Kingdom, but the first twelve entrants (Accrington, Aston Villa, Blackburn Rovers, Bolton Wanderers, Burnley, Derby County, Everton, Notts County, Preston North End, Stoke (now Stoke City), West Bromwich Albion and Wolverhampton Wanderers) were all from the Midlands or North of England (in later years the competition became the de facto English league, though some clubs from outside England still compete in it). Each club in the League played each other twice (once at home and once away) and would be awarded two points for a win, one for a draw and none for a loss. From these points, a league table was drawn up. Preston North End were in first place at the end of the season and thus became the first ever Football League champions. They did not lose a match all season (a feat only accomplished once since, by Arsenal in 2003–04) and also won the FA Cup.

The Football League is still going today and now has 72 clubs in three divisions (down from an all-time high of 92 clubs in four divisions). Since the 1992–93 season, it has become only the second-most important league competition, behind the FA Premier League in the English football league system.

== Events ==
- Sheffield United F.C. formed on 22 March 1889 from the Sheffield United Cricket Club in a meeting at the Adelphi Hotel. They played their home matches at Bramall Lane

== National team ==
England finished second in the 1888–89 British Home Championship, which was won by Scotland.

John Yates, of Burnley, scored 3 goals against Ireland in his only appearance for England.

Date	Venue	Home team	Visitors	Score	Comp	England scorers
23 Feb 1889	Victoria Ground, Stoke-on-Trent	England	Wales	4–1	BHC	Billy Bassett (West Bromwich Albion), John Goodall (Preston North End), Jack Southworth (Blackburn Rovers) and Fred Dewhurst (Preston North End)
2 Mar 1889	Anfield, Liverpool	England	Ireland	6–1	BHC	Alf Shelton (Notts County), John Yates (Burnley) (3), Joe Lofthouse (Accrington) and John Brodie (Wolverhampton Wanderers)
13 Apr 1889	Kennington Oval, London	England	Scotland	2–3	BHC	Billy Bassett (West Bromwich Albion) (15, 17 mins)

Key

- BHC = 1888–89 British Home Championship

=== 1889 British Home Championship table ===
Team	Pld	W	D	L	GF	GA	GD	Pts
Scotland	3	2	1	0	10	2	+8	5
England	3	2	0	1	12	5	+7	4
Wales	3	1	1	1	4	5	−1	3
Ireland	3	0	0	3	2	16	−14	0

Rules for classification: 1) points. The points system worked as follows: 2 points for a win and 1 point for a draw.

== Honours ==
Competition	Winner
FA Cup	Preston North End (1st FA Cup title)
The Football League	Preston North End (1st English title)*

* Indicates new record for competition

== FA Cup ==
=== Final ===
Date	Home team	Visitors	Score	Venue
30 Mar 1889	Preston North End	Wolverhampton Wanderers	3–0	Kennington Oval

== The Football League ==
=== League table ===
The Football League
- Season: 1888–89
- Champions: Preston North End (1st English title)
- Relegated: none
- FA Cup winners: Preston North End (1st FA Cup title)
- Matches: 132
- Goals: 586 (4.44 per match)
- Top goalscorer: John Goodall (Preston North End), 21
- Biggest home win: Aston Villa – Notts County 9–1 (29 Sept 1888)
- Biggest away win: Notts County – Preston 0–7 (3 Nov 1888)
- Highest scoring: 10: Aston Villa – Notts County 9–1 (29 Sept 1888); Bolton – Notts County 7–3 (9 Mar 1889); Blackburn Rovers – Accrington 5–5 (15 Sept 1888)
- Longest winning run: 6 – Preston North End (8 Sep – 13 Oct 1888)
- Longest unbeaten run: 22 – Preston North End (8 Sep 1888 – 9 Feb 1889), the entire season
- Longest losing run: 8 – Derby County (29 Sep – 8 Dec 1888)
- Highest attendance: ?
- Lowest attendance: ?
- Average attendance: ?

Pos	Team	Pld	W	D	L	GF	GA	GAv	Pts	Qualification
1	Preston North End (C)	22	18	4	0	74	15	4.933	40	
2	Aston Villa	22	12	5	5	61	43	1.419	29	
3	Wolverhampton Wanderers	22	12	4	6	51	37	1.378	28	
4	Blackburn Rovers	22	10	6	6	66	45	1.467	26	
5	Bolton Wanderers	22	10	2	10	63	59	1.068	22	
6	West Bromwich Albion	22	10	2	10	40	46	0.870	22	
7	Accrington	22	6	8	8	48	48	1.000	20	
8	Everton	22	9	2	11	35	47	0.745	20	
9	Burnley	22	7	3	12	42	62	0.677	17	Re-elected
10	Derby County	22	7	2	13	41	61	0.672	16	Re-elected
11	Notts County	22	5	2	15	40	73	0.548	12	Re-elected
12	Stoke	22	4	4	14	26	51	0.510	12	Re-elected

Source: World Football
Rules for classification: 1) Points; 2) Goal average; 3) Goals scored
(C) Champions

=== Stadia and locations ===
Locations of the Football League 1888–89 teams

Team	Location	Stadium	Stadium capacity
Accrington	Accrington	Thorneyholme Road	n/a
Aston Villa	Birmingham	Wellington Road (Perry Barr)	n/a
Blackburn Rovers	Blackburn	Leamington Road	600–700
Bolton Wanderers	Bolton	Pike's Lane	n/a
Burnley	Burnley	Turf Moor	n/a
Derby County	Derby	Racecourse Ground	n/a
Everton	Liverpool	Anfield	n/a
Notts County	Nottingham	Trent Bridge Cricket Ground	n/a
Preston North End	Preston	Deepdale	n/a
Stoke	Stoke-on-Trent	Victoria Ground	n/a
West Bromwich Albion	West Bromwich	Stoney Lane	n/a
Wolverhampton Wanderers	Wolverhampton	Dudley Road	n/a

=== Top scorers ===
Rank	Scorer	Club	Goals	Matches played	Goals per match
1	(England) John Goodall	Preston North End	21	21	1.00
2	(Scotland) James D. Ross	Preston North End	18	21	0.86
3	(England) Albert Allen	Aston Villa	17	21	0.81
4	(England) John Southworth	Blackburn Rovers	16	21	0.76
4	(England) Harry Wood	Wolverhampton Wanderers	16	17	0.94
6	(England) Thomas Green	Aston Villa	14	21	0.67
7	(Scotland) James Brogan	Bolton Wanderers	13	22	0.59
7	(England) David Weir	Bolton Wanderers	13	22	0.59
9	(England) Frederick Dewhurst	Preston North End	12	17	0.71
9	(England) Herbert L. Fecitt	Blackburn Rovers	12	17	0.71
9	(Scotland) Alexander Barbour	Accrington	12	19	0.63
9	(Scotland) Alexander Higgins	Derby County	12	21	0.57
9	(England) Thomas Pearson	West Bromwich Albion	12	22	0.55
