= Thomas Midgley (footballer) =

English footballer

Personal information
- Full name: Thomas Midgley
- Date of birth: 1856
- Place of birth: Leeds, England
- Date of death: 1957 (aged 100–101)
- Position: Inside forward

Senior career*
| Years | Team | Apps | (Gls) |
| 1888 | Burnley | 1 | (0) |
- * Club domestic league appearances and goals

Thomas Midgley (1856–1957) was an English professional footballer who played in League football, as an inside forward, for Burnley.

Born in Leeds, West Yorkshire, Midgley became a teacher and worked in Culham, Oxford and Ripon before being appointed as headmaster at Grant's School, Burnley in the late 1870s. As early as 1880 at Carlton Road School he had children playing association football. Midgley then became a player and the captain of the Burnley Rovers Rugby club. In May 1882, the club changed codes to association football and changed its name to Burnley. He represented the club in many of the early friendly matches, but by the time the Football League was formed in 1888, Midgley was nearing the end of his career as a footballer.

Midgley was proud to be involved in the early days of League Football. He made his League debut, playing as an inside–forward on 20 October 1888 at Victoria Ground, the then home of Stoke. The visitors lost 4–3. That was Midgeley's only appearance in season 1888–89 and he was not retained at the end of the season. However at least his only League appearance he played in a forward line that scored three. Also Midgeley's appearance was historic as he was approximately (his birthdate in 1856 is unknown) 34 years and 112 days old. Therefore, on the seventh weekend of League football not only did Thomas Midgeley supplant Dannie Friel as Burnley's oldest League player but Midgeley also replaced Joe Beverley of Blackburn Rovers as the League's oldest player.

Midgley carried on teaching until he retired in 1921. Five years after retiring he moved to Wales.
