= Jack Edwards (footballer, born 1867) =

Early footballer

Personal information
- Full name: John Bentley Edwards
- Date of birth: 25th August, 1867
- Place of birth: Preston, Lancashire, England
- Date of death: October, 1960 (aged 93)
- Place of death: Preston, Lancashire, England
- Position: Winger

Senior career*
Years	Team	Apps	(Gls)
1888–1889	Preston North End	4	(3)
- * Club domestic league appearances and goals

John Bentley 'Jack' Edwards (25 August 1867 – October 1960) was an English footballer who played in The Football League for Preston North End.

Jack Edwards made his Football League and Club debut on 13 October 1888, playing as a winger, at Deepdale, the home of Preston North End. The visitors were West Bromwich Albion and the home team won 3–0. Edwards also scored his debut club and League goal in this match. Two minutes into the second–half, with the scores at 0–0, Edwards scored from a pass made by his wing–colleague Jack Gordon. Edwards appeared in four of the 22 League matches played by Preston North End in season 1888–89 and scored three League goals. As a forward (one appearance), he played in a Preston forward–line that scored three–League–goals–or–more once. As a winger (three appearances) he played in a Preston midfield that achieved big (three–League–goals–or–more) wins on two occasions. He scored three League goals, of which, two came in one match. Edwards, playing as a forward, scored two as his team defeated Notts County 4–1 at Deepdale on 5 January 1889. Despite putting in such a good performance, he never played for Preston North End or in a Football League match again.

== Personal Life and Death ==
He married Ellen Cock on 23 September 1891 and died in October 1960 at the age of 93.
