= Willie Graham (footballer, born 1866) =

Scottish footballer (died 1937)

Personal information
- Date of birth: January 1866
- Place of birth: Dreghorn, Scotland
- Date of death: 1937 (aged 70–71)
- Position: Half-back

Senior career*
Years	Team	Apps	(Gls)
- New Cumnock F.C.
1888–1889	Preston North End	5	(0)
- New Cummock
- Newcastle East End
1893–1896	Newcastle United	88	(10)
Total		93	(10)
- * Club domestic league appearances and goals

William Graham (January 1866 – 1937) was a Scottish footballer who played in the English Football League for Newcastle United and championship winning Preston North End.

Graham made his League debut on 8 September 1888 at centre-half for Preston North End against Burnley at Deepdale in Preston; his side won 5–2. He played in only five of Preston's 22 League Championship matches.

His brother Johnny was also a footballer and a teammate at Preston.
