= Sandy Robertson (footballer, born 1860) =

Scottish footballer

Personal information
- Full name: Alexander Sanders Robertson
- Date of birth: December 1860
- Place of birth: Edinburgh, Scotland
- Date of death: 1927 (aged 66–67)
- Place of death: Germiston, South Africa
- Position: Half back

Senior career*
Years	Team	Apps	(Gls)
–	Hanover		
–	St Bernard's		
1888–1890	Preston North End	28	(3)
1890–1892	Royal Arsenal		
- * Club domestic league appearances and goals

Alexander Robertson (December 1860 – 1927) was a Scottish footballer who played in the English Football League for Preston North End.

Having earlier played in Edinburgh for St Bernard's, also making several appearances for the regional representative team, Robertson made his League and Preston North End debut on 8 September 1888 at wing–half against Burnley at Deepdale; Preston won 5–2. Sandy Robertson's first League goal was scored on 29 September 1888 at County Ground, in a 3–2 win for Preston North End over Derby County; he scored Preston's opener when they were trailing 2–1. Robertson appeared in 21 of Preston' 22 League Championship matches and scored three goals, and won a Championship winners medal. He only played one FA Cup tie in 1888–89, in the First Round.

The following season Robertson could not hold down a regular place in the side. North End retained the title and felt they could manage without the Scotsman so he was released. He played eight games (seven League and one FA Cup) in his last season. He moved to Royal Arsenal in 1890 and played for the club until he left in 1892.

Robertson died in 1927 aged 66/67.
