= Robert Mills-Roberts =

Welsh footballer and surgeon (1862–1935)

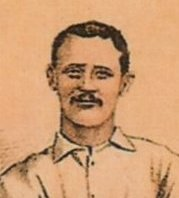
- 1889 sketch of Mills-Roberts

Personal information
- Full name: Robert Herbert Mills-Roberts
- Date of birth: 5 August 1862
- Place of birth: Ffestiniog, Merionethshire, Wales
- Date of death: 27 November 1935 (aged 73)
- Place of death: Bournemouth, England
- Position: Goalkeeper

Youth career
- Friars School, Bangor
- University College, Aberystwyth

Senior career*
Years	Team	Apps	(Gls)
1879–1882	Aberystwyth Town	4	(0)
- St. Thomas' Hospital, London
- United Hospitals
- Crusaders
1884–1885	Barnes		
1884–1888	Corinthian		
1886–1887	Casuals		
1887–1889	Preston North End	2	(0)
- Warwick County
- Birmingham St George's
1890–1891	Gloucester		
- Llanberis

International career
1885–1892	Wales	8	(0)
- * Club domestic league appearances and goals

Robert Herbert Mills-Roberts (5 August 1862 – 27 November 1935) was a Welsh footballer. A Welsh international, he was a member of the Preston North End side which became known as "The Invincibles".

He was born at Ffestiniog on 5 August 1862 and educated at Friars School, Bangor and University College, Aberystwyth. As a student he played both association football and rugby football, but he eventually emerged as a first rate goalkeeper while studying at St Thomas's Hospital, London. He made the first of his eight appearances for Wales in 1885, and in 1887 was invited to play as an amateur for Preston North End in their FA Cup ties. He was a member of the Preston sides which were FA Cup Finalists in 1888 and FA Cup Winners in 1889. Their victory in the Cup in the 1888–89 season was achieved without conceding a single goal throughout, which was attributed to his goalkeeping skills. He also played for Barnes, Casuals, and Birmingham St George's. He retired in 1890, but was persuaded to make a last appearance for Wales in 1892.

Between 1884 and 1888, he made seven appearances for the Corinthians amateur club, including playing for Corinthian three times against Preston North End.

Mills-Roberts qualified as a doctor in July 1887, and the following year was appointed the house surgeon at Birmingham General Hospital. He later took a position with the hospital at the Dinorwic Slate Quarry, and served with the British Expeditionary Force in the First World War. At the end of his working career, he retired to Bournemouth, where aged 73 he died on 27 November 1935.
