= Jock Inglis =

Scottish footballer

Personal information
- Full name: John Inglis
- Date of birth: 17 June 1859
- Place of birth: Kilwinning, Scotland
- Date of death: 16 August 1920 (aged 61)
- Place of death: Preston, Lancashire, England
- Position: Forward

Senior career*
Years	Team	Apps	(Gls)
1888–1889	Preston North End	3	(2)
- * Club domestic league appearances and goals

John 'Jock' Inglis (17 June 1859 – 16 August 1920) was a Scottish footballer who played in The Football League for Preston North End.
