= Nick Ross (footballer, born 1862) =

Scottish footballer (1862–1894)

Personal information
- Date of birth: 6 December 1862
- Place of birth: Edinburgh, Scotland
- Date of death: 7 August 1894 (aged 31)
- Positions: Defender; striker

Senior career*
Years	Team	Apps	(Gls)
1880–1883	Heart of Midlothian		
1883–1888	Preston North End		
1888–1889	Everton	19	(4)
1889	Linfield		
1889–1893	Preston North End	95	(25)
Total		114	(29)

International career
1891	Football League XI	1	(0)
- * Club domestic league appearances and goals

Nicholas John Ross (6 December 1862 – 7 August 1894) was a Scottish footballer who played as a defender or striker. He was a Preston North End player upon his death, playing as full back.

== Career ==
Ross played for, and captained, Heart of Midlothian in the early stages of his football career before being persuaded to join Preston North End by club secretary William Sudell who also provided him with a job as a slater. Preston North End converted Ross from a centre-forward to a left-back.

Ross was made captain of Preston and over the next few years earned a reputation as one of the best defenders in English football. He featured in the 1886–87 FA Cup Semi-Final where Preston were beaten 2–1 by West Bromwich Albion. He was transferred to Everton in July 1888 where he was reportedly paid £10 per month – a significantly above-average wage for a footballer at the time.

=== 1888–89 season ===
Ross made his League debut on 8 September 1888, playing as a full-back, at Anfield, the then home of Everton. The home team defeated the visitors Accrington 2–1. He scored his debut League goal on 15 September 1888, playing at full-back, at Anfield when the visitors were Notts County. The home team defeated the visitors 2–1 with Ross scoring the second of Everton' two goals. He was the first ever full–back to score a League goal. Ross appeared in 18 of the 22 League matches played by Everton in season 1888–89, scoring four League goals. As a full-back he played in an Everton defence that kept two clean sheets.

=== After Everton ===
Ross returned to Preston after just one season with Everton, during which time Preston won both the League Championship and the FA Cup. During his second spell with the club he was converted to a striker and helped the club win the 1889–90 League Championship, the second in a row. Health problems forced him to retire from football in 1893 and he died a year later from tuberculosis.

His younger brother, Jimmy, was also a noted footballer for Preston, part of "The Invincibles", and the league top scorer for the 1890–91 season.

== Legacy ==
In 1906 William Pickford, co-author of Association Football and the Men who Made it (1905) and a future FA President, described Ross as a footballing genius matched only by Ernest Needham and G.O. Smith.

== Professional baseball ==
In 1890 Ross, along with his brother, were recruited by Preston North End Baseball Club for the 1890 National League of Baseball of Great Britain, playing first base. Both brothers featured prominently for the reserve amateur team, who won the 1890 Amateur Championship Baseball Cup.

== Death ==
On 7 August, 1894 the Preston North End club announced his death when ill-health compelled him to take a holiday abroad. He had been ailing for some time, his lengthy indisposition terminating fatally at noon yesterday. The news will be received with deep regret.
