= Johnny Graham (footballer, born 1857) =

Scottish footballer

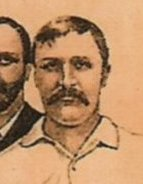
- 1889 sketch of Graham

Personal information
- Full name: John Graham
- Date of birth: 23 February 1857
- Place of birth: Coylton, Scotland
- Date of death: 23 February 1927 (aged 70)
- Position: Half-back

Senior career*
Years	Team	Apps	(Gls)
1883–1884	Annbank		
1884–1890	Preston North End	39	(0)

International career
1884	Scotland	1	(0)
- * Club domestic league appearances and goals

John Graham (23 February 1857 – 23 February 1927) was a Scottish professional footballer of the 1880s. He was a player for Preston North End from 1884 until 27 March 1890 when he retired because of an injury. He was a member of 'the invincibles'.

== Career ==
Toughened by his job as a quarryman, Graham initially played with Annbank in the Ayrshire Football Combination, and won one cap for the Scotland national football team in 1884; his appearance was in Scotland'a first–ever British Home Championship match, played on 26 January 1884 at the Ulster Cricket Ground against Ireland – Scotland won 5–0. Graham is the only serving Annbank player to have been selected for international duty.

He joined Preston North End in season 1884–85 (moving to England discounted him from further Scotland caps at that time), and played in the 1888 FA Cup Final against West Bromwich Albion at Kennington Oval on 24 March 1888. North End lost 2–1. Graham made his Football League debut on 8 September 1888 at wing-half for Preston against Burnley at Deepdale; Preston won 5–2. On his debut he was the oldest player in the competition, although one week later Joe Beverley of Blackburn Rovers took this distinction. When Graham played as a wing-half on 6 October 1888 against Stoke, he was 31 years 226 days old; that made him, on that fifth weekend of League football, Preston North End's oldest player. Graham played in all of Preston's 22 League Championship matches, and also played in all five FA Cup ties including the semi–final and the final. The 1889 FA Cup Final was played at Kennington Oval on 30 March 1889 and the opponents were Wolverhampton Wanderers. Preston won 3–0 to secure the double without losing a match. During the 1888–89 season his brother Willie also played for Preston.

Graham played in 17 League matches during the 1889–90 season as he won his second Championship medal. Towards the end of that season his football career was ended when he suffered a broken collarbone in a game. Though he never got on the score sheet for North End during their League days, he did create a number of goalscoring opportunities for the likes of John Goodall and Jimmy Ross with his long throws. He died on his 70th birthday.
