= Richard Whittle =

English footballer

Personal information
- Date of birth: Quarter 4 1864
- Place of birth: Preston, Lancashire
- Date of death: 1934 (aged 69–70)
- Position: Defender

Senior career*
Years	Team	Apps	(Gls)
1883–1884	Fishwick Ramblers		
1884–1885	Preston Swifts		
1885–1886	Fishwick Ramblers		
1886–1888	Haydock		
1888–1889	Preston North End	1	(1)
- * Club domestic league appearances and goals

Richard Whittle was born in Preston, Lancashire, in the fourth quarter of 1864 and he was a footballer who played in The Football League for Preston North End.

Richard Whittle signed for Fishwick Ramblers, a Preston–based club who did appear in the FA Cup in the mid-1880s. In 1884 he moved to another Preston–based club called Preston Swifts. There appears to be no data on this club at all. In 1885 Whittle returned to Fishwick Ramblers but was gone in 1886. In 1886 Whittle joined Haydock. Haydock joined the Lancashire League 12 years after Whittle had joined. In 1888 Whittle joined Preston North End. Whittle was described as a strong–tackling defender.

Richard Whittle, playing as a full–back, made his Preston North End and League debut on 6 October 1888 at Deepdale, the home of Preston North End. The visitors were Stoke and the home team won 7–0. Whittle scored his debut and only League goal in this match. Whittle made the score 6–0 with a powerful 30 yard shot. Richard Whittle appeared in one of the 22 League matches played by Preston North End in season 1888–89 and scored one League goal. Whittle, as a full–back (one appearance), played in a Preston North End defence that achieved a clean–sheet once. Preston North End won the League Championship but, as Whittle only played the once one can only speculate whether he was granted a Championship winners medal.
