= James Trainer =

Welsh footballer

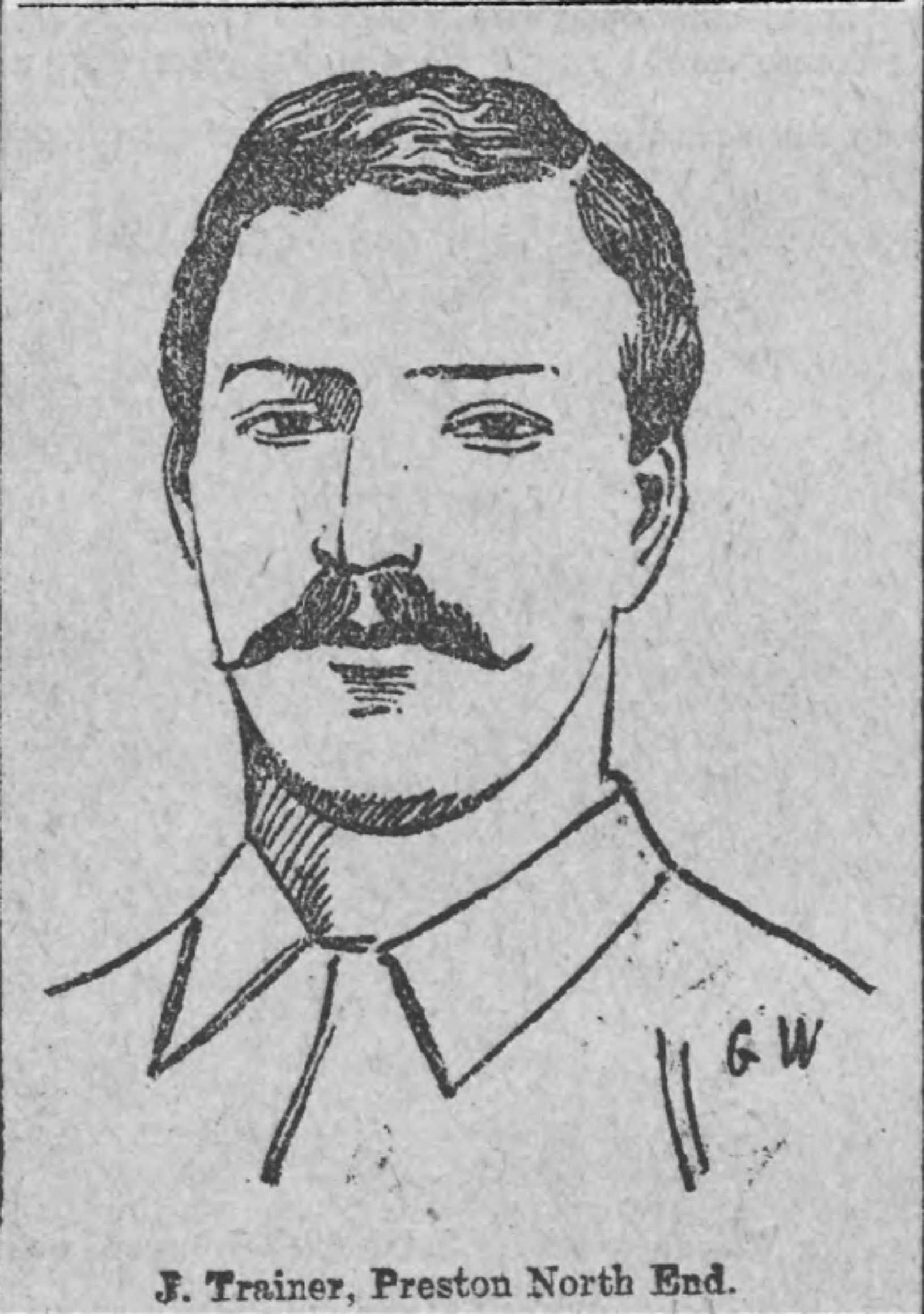

Personal information
- Full name: James Trainer
- Date of birth: 7 January 1863
- Place of birth: Wrexham, Wales
- Date of death: 5 August 1915 (aged 52)
- Place of death: Paddington, England
- Height: 5 ft 11 in (1.80 m)
- Position: Goalkeeper

Youth career
- Penybryn Wanderers
- Challenger BC
- 1876–1878: Wrexham Victoria
- 1878–1881: Wrexham Grosvenor

Senior career*
Years	Team	Apps	(Gls)
1881–1883	Wrexham	6	(0)
1883–1885	Great Lever		
1885–1887	Bolton Wanderers		
1887–1899	Preston North End	253	(0)

International career
1887–1899	Wales	20	(0)
- * Club domestic league appearances and goals

James Trainer (7 January 1863 in Wrexham – 5 August 1915 in Paddington, Central London, England) was a Welsh association football player of the Victorian era. He was named the best goalkeeper of the English Football League several consecutive seasons starting in 1888–89, when he was part of the unbeaten Preston North End team nicknamed "The Invincibles".

== Football career ==
James Trainer, a time–served coachbuilder played his first senior match for a Wrexham club and before long had established a reputation as an excellent goalkeeper. He left the 'Robins' under a cloud, following a particularly rough FA Cup tie against Oswestry in December 1883. He was alleged to have insulted the referee and the FA banned Wrexham from the competition and reported Trainer's offence to the Football Association of Wales. After a spell with Great Lever, he joined Bolton Wanderers in 1884. He went on to appear in a number of pre–League games for the Wanderers and his form earned him international recognition when he played for Wales against Scotland in 1887. Trainer enjoyed his greatest success at Preston North End as a member of the 'Invincibles'. Curiously he had impressed North End while playing for Bolton at Deepdale, the home of Preston North End, in a match in which he let in 12 goals. He first appeared for North End in August 1887 on a short tour of Scotland. Although he was on the losing side against Hibernian, it was another eight months before he tasted defeat again. Trainer sharpened up his catching ability by playing for the club's baseball team and in North End's pre–League days was known to 'wear a mackintosh' and 'shelter under an umbrella' during a game.

Jimmy Trainer made his League debut on 8 September 1888 in goal for Preston North End against Burnley at Deepdale. Preston won 5–2. Jimmy Trainer played 20 of Preston' 22 League Championship matches and as a goalkeeper played in a Preston North End defence that achieved 12 clean-sheets and restricted the opposition to one–League–goal–in–a–match on three separate occasions. Jimmy Trainer assisted Preston North End to be 1888–89 League Champions. Preston North End went onto win the 1889 FA Cup and complete the first–ever double. The No:2 goalkeeper played in FA Cup ties and so Trainer did not play in the 1889 FA Cup campaign.

Between 1888 and 1897 Trainer played in 253 games for Preston, and after retiring he became landlord of the Lamb Hotel in Preston.

He later moved to London, where his business failed. He died in poverty in 1915.

== Professional Baseball ==
In 1890 Trainer played first base professionally at Preston North End Baseball Club in the National League of Baseball of Great Britain.

== Career statistics ==
=== International ===
Appearances and goals by national team and year
National team	Year	Apps	Goals
Wales	1887	1	0
Wales	1888	1	0
Wales	1889	1	0
Wales	1890	1	0
Wales	1891	1	0
Wales	1892	2	0
Wales	1893	1	0
Wales	1894	2	0
Wales	1895	2	0
Wales	1896	1	0
Wales	1897	3	0
Wales	1898	2	0
Wales	1899	2	0
Total		20	0

== Honours ==
Wrexham

- Welsh Cup: 1882–83

Preston North End

- Football League First Division: 1888–89, 1889–90, runner-up 1890–91, 1891–92, 1892–93
- FA Cup: 1888–89
