= Sammy Thomson =

Scottish footballer

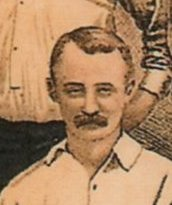
- 1889 sketch of Thomson

Personal information
- Date of birth: 14 February 1862
- Place of birth: Lugar, East Ayrshire, Scotland
- Date of death: 23 December 1943 (aged 81)
- Positions: Forward; winger

Senior career*
Years	Team	Apps	(Gls)
1882–1884	Lugar Boswell		
1884–1885	Rangers		
1888–1889	Preston North End	34	(10)
1890	Wolverhampton Wanderers	21	(9)
1891	Everton	3	(1)
1892	Accrington	19	(5)
Total		77	(25)

International career
1884	Scotland	2	(0)
- * Club domestic league appearances and goals

Samuel Thomson (14 February 1862 – 23 December 1943) was a Scottish footballer. A Scotland international, he was a member of the Preston North End side which became known as "The Invincibles".

== Career ==
Thomson was born at Lugar, Scotland on 14 February 1862. His first club was Lugar Boswell, and while with them he was twice picked to play for Scotland – the only serving Lugar player to have been selected for international duty. He later had a short spell with Rangers, before becoming one of the many Scottish-born footballers who joined Preston North End as the Lancashire club assembled a side that was almost unbeatable.

Thomson signed for Preston North End in 1888. Playing as a winger, he made his League debut on 15 September 1888 at Dudley Road, the then home of Wolverhampton Wanderers. Preston defeated the home team 4–0. Thomson scored his debut League goal on 12 November 1888, at Victoria Ground, the then home of Stoke. Thomson scored the third goal as Preston North End defeated the home team 3–0. He appeared in 16 of the 22 League matches played by Preston North End during the 1888–89 season and scored three goals. It was Thomson's performances in the club's run to the 1889 FA Cup Final that endeared him to Preston fans, and he earned himself a winner's medal as Preston North End beat Wolverhampton Wanderers 3–0; he scored one of the three goals.

He was an important member of the side that retained the title in season 1889–90 but in the close season he was persuaded to join Wolverhampton Wanderers without the Deepdale club's permission. The incident went before the Committee and Wolves were fined £50 for their misconduct. Having joined Wolves, he scored nine goals in 24 League and FA Cup matches and he then moved to Everton. After a handful of games for Everton he was on the move again, this time to Accrington where he ended his playing days. He later became a railway clerk based in Preston. He died aged 81 on 23 December 1943.
