= Bob Holmes (footballer) =

English footballer (1867–1955)

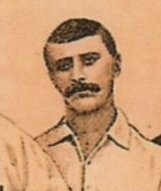
- 1889 sketch of Holmes

Personal information
- Full name: Robert Holmes
- Date of birth: 23 June 1867
- Place of birth: Preston, Lancashire, England
- Date of death: 17 November 1955 (aged 88)
- Place of death: Preston, Lancashire, England
- Position: Left back

Senior career*
Years	Team	Apps	(Gls)
1888–1902	Preston North End	300	(1)

International career
1888–1895	England	7	(0)
- * Club domestic league appearances and goals

Robert Holmes (23 June 1867 – 17 November 1955) was a professional footballer, who played for Preston North End.

== Career ==
Holmes was the longest–serving survivor of the Preston North End team known as the 'Invincibles' when he died aged 88 in November 1955. His first club was Preston Olympic from 1883. There is no clear record of when he signed for Preston North End. Season 1887–88 was when he came to prominence. He played wing–half in the 1888 FA Cup Final played on 24 March 1888 at Kennington Oval against West Bromwich Albion. Preston North End lost 2–1. In the following month, Holmes made his international debut for England, on 7 April 1888 against Ireland. England won 5–1 at the Ulster Cricket Ground.

Holmes made his League debut on 8 September 1888 at full-back for Preston North End against Burnley at Preston North End's Deepdale ground. Preston won 5–2. When he played as a full–back against Burnley on 8 September 1888 he was 21 years 77 days old; which made him, on the first weekend of League football, Preston North End's youngest player. Holmes played all of Preston's 22 League Championship matches and played in a defence-line that achieved 13 clean-sheets and restricted the opposition to one–League–goal–in–a–match on three separate occasions. He appeared in all five FA Cup ties of season 1888–89 and even scored in an earlier round. He played left–back in the 1889 FA Cup Final which Preston North End won 3–0, defeating Wolverhampton Wanderers thereby achieving the first–ever League and FA Cup double in the first season it could be won. Holmes won League Championship and FA Cup winners medals.

Holmes made seven appearances for England, all at left–back, and was never on the losing side for England. He was made England captain for the match against Wales on 13 March 1894 and he led his team to a 6–0 victory. He later became President of the Football Players' Union, retired at the end of the 1899–1900 season but was retained on the club's books as an amateur. He actually played the last of his 300 games on Boxing Day 1902, when North End lost 2–0 to Manchester City. He scored just one League goal, in 1895. On hanging up his boots he took up refereeing but in December 1903 he resigned his position after securing a business in Preston town centre. In April 1908 he was appointed trainer to the England amateur international team to play in Belgium and Germany over Easter of that year.

After retirement from playing, Holmes became a football trainer, and was the trainer/manager when Blackburn Rovers won their first league title in 1912.

Holmes went on to become known as the "last of the Invincibles" when he was the only surviving member of the 1889 FA Cup final team by the time Preston reached the 1954 final.

== Professional Baseball ==
Holmes played baseball professionally as a pitcher, for Preston North End Baseball Club in the 1890 National League of Baseball of Great Britain.

== Personal life ==
Holmes accidentally fell and broke his thigh in 1955. He died of his injury at Preston Royal Infirmary.
