= George Drummond (footballer, born 1865) =

Scottish footballer

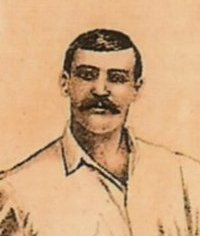
- 1889 sketch of Drummond

Personal information
- Full name: George Drummond
- Date of birth: 9 January 1865
- Place of birth: Edinburgh, Scotland
- Date of death: 15 February 1914 (aged 49)
- Position: Utility player

Senior career*
| Years | Team | Apps | (Gls) |
| 1883 | St Bernard's | | |
| 1883–1899 | Preston North End | 139 | (36) |
- * Club domestic league appearances and goals

George Drummond, known as Geordie Drummond (9 January 1865 – 15 February 1914) was a professional footballer who was a utility player, including playing as a left winger and a goalkeeper. Drummond played for St Bernard's before joining Preston North End.

He was a key member of the Preston team which won the first ever Football League championship in the 1888–89 season without losing a match.

== Playing career ==
Having learnt his football with St. Bernard's, Geordie Drummond won a county cap for Edinburgh against representatives of Glasgow. London and Sheffield. He was only 18 years old when he moved to south to Preston but impressed immediately with a hat–trick in a 4–4 draw against Accrington in September 1883. A versatile footballer, he settled into the North End side at inside–right before playing on both wings, centre–forward, half–back, goalkeeper, and full–back. Drummond played on the left wing in the 1888 FA Cup Final which Preston North End lost 2–1 to West Bromwich Albion.

Geordie Drummond, playing as a winger, made his League debut on 8 September 1888 at Deepdale, the home of Preston North End. The visitors were Burnley who were defeated 5–2. Geordie Drummond, playing as a winger, scored his debut League goal on 22 September 1888 at Deepdale against Bolton Wanderers. Preston North End scored the opening goal in a 3–1 win. Fred Dewhurst appeared in 12 of Preston North End' 22 League Championship matches played in season 1888–89, scoring one goal. As a winger/wing-half (nine appearances) he played in a Preston North End midfield that achieved a big (three goals or more) win on five occasions. He also played twice as a full-back in a Preston North End defence that kept two clean sheets. Preston North End played in four FA Cup ties including playing at wing–half in the Final. The Final was played at Kennington Oval on 30 March 1889 and Preston North End defeated Wolverhampton Wanderers 3–0.

From 8 September 1888 until 19 September 1898 Geordie Drummond played 139 League matches for Preston North End scoring 36 goals. He only made nine appearances in seasons 1896–97, 1897–98 and 1898–99. In the same period Drummond played in 19 FA Cup ties scoring four goals. Drummond assisted Preston North End to win two League Championship titles and an FA Cup win. Preston North End finished League runners–up from 1890 to 1893. Preston North End also reached the FA Cup semi–final in 1893. Towards the end of his first–team career, he began to train the successful North End reserve team and in 1900 he was awarded a testimonial game when almost 6,000 paid to see North End take on the 'Old Invincibles'. In 1902 he was appointed as the Deepdale club's first–team trainer, a position he later held at Burnley and Falkirk. While in Scotland he fell ill and returned home to Preston in the autumn of 1913, but a year later he died from cancer aged 49.

== Professional Baseball ==
In 1890 Drummond played right field professionally for Preston North End Baseball Club in the National League of Baseball of Great Britain.
