= Jack Gordon (footballer, born 1863) =

Scottish footballer

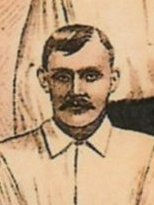
- 1889 sketch of Gordon

Personal information
- Date of birth: 28 April 1861
- Place of birth: Bridge of Weir, Scotland
- Date of death: 14 May 1941 (aged 80)
- Place of death: London, England
- Position: Forward

Senior career*
Years	Team	Apps	(Gls)
1882	Preston North End		
1882–1884	Port Glasgow Athletic		
1884–1894	Preston North End	113	(27)
1895	Loughborough	3	(1)
1897–1898	Wigan County		
Total		116	(28)
- * Club domestic league appearances and goals

John Barr Gordon (28 April 1861 – 14 May 1941) was a Scottish professional footballer of the 1880s and 1890s.

He played in the English Football League with Preston North End and Loughborough.

== Career ==
One of the first Scotsmen to play for North End, Jack Gordon was working at Leyland as a joiner when he was first asked to play for the club in February 1882. He scored on his debut in a 7–0 win over Fishwick Ramblers, a local side who were then neighbours and rivals of North End. Yet, despite impressing, he returned home to Port Glasgow where he worked in the shipyards and played football for Port Glasgow Athletic. Two years later he returned to Deepdale, the home of Preston North End, and after a handful of games at inside–right, switched to the wing where he turned up with Jimmy Ross. He scored many goals in North End's pre–League days, including five in the 26–0 win over Hyde United. His pinpoint crosses led to Preston players scoring a large number of goals with their heads. Jack Gordon played in the 1888 FA Cup Final on the right wing but was on the losing side. Preston North End lost 2–1 to West Bromwich Albion at Kennington Oval on 24 March 1888.

Jack Gordon made his League debut on 8 September 1888 as a winger for Preston North End against Burnley at Deepdale. Preston won 5–2 and Jack Gordon scored Preston North End' second goal. Jack Gordon played in 20 of Preston' 22 League Championship matches. As a winger he played in a Preston North End midfield that achieved a big (three–League–goals–or–more) win on 11 separate occasions. Jack Gordon scored ten League goals in 1888–1889. His ten goals included a hat–trick on 3 November 1888 at Trent Bridge in a 7–0 win over Notts County. Gordon scored the Preston North End second, fifth and sixth goals. He also scored two goals in a match on 22 September 1888 when he scored North End' second and third goals in a 3–1 win over Bolton Wanderers. He played in all five FA Cup ties including the 3–0 Final win over Wolverhampton Wanderers at Kennington Oval on 30 March 1889. Jack Gordon achieved League Championship and FA Cup Winners medals.

Jack Gordon played 134 first–team matches for Preston North End from 8 September 1888 until 24 November 1894 scoring 35 goals. 113 were played in League matches scoring 27 League goals. He also played for four seasons before the Football League commenced but can find no record of the number of games he played and goals scored from 1884 to 1888. In October 1891, he scored North End's first–ever penalty in a 4–2 win at Blackburn Rovers. He won a second League Championship Winners' Medal for the season 1889–90. He also played in all seven FA Cup ties, in season 1892–93, including a semi–final (and replay) against Everton. Preston North End lost the replay 2–1, Gordon scoring Preston' only goal.

He signed for Loughborough in July 1895 but only played for them five times (three League) scoring one League goal. He signed for Wigan County in 1897, a Lancashire League team. It is not recorded when he retired.

Sadly, Jack Gordon developed congestion of the lungs and pleurisy and doctors had to battle for three days to save his life.

After retiring as a footballer he moved to London, where he succeeded in business and for a time he was a Billiards Room Keeper.

== Honours ==
Jack Gordon gained the following honours during his playing career:-

Preston North End

- English Football League (Champions): 1888–89, 1889–90
- FA Cup (Winners): 1888–89
- FA Cup (Runners-Up): 1887–88
- Lancashire Cup (Winners): 1886–87, 1892-93

== Professional baseball ==
Gordon played professionally as a centre fielder for Preston North End Baseball Club in the 1890 National League of Baseball of Great Britain, but was mostly in the amateur team.
