= Jimmy Ross (footballer, born 1866) =

Scottish footballer (1866–1902)

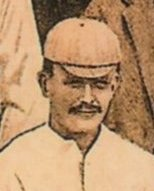
- 1889 sketch of Ross

Personal information
- Full name: James Daniel Ross
- Date of birth: 28 March 1866
- Place of birth: Edinburgh, Scotland
- Date of death: 12 June 1902 (aged 36)
- Position: Inside forward

Senior career*
Years	Team	Apps	(Gls)
- St Bernard's
1883–1894	Preston North End	130	(85)
1894–1897	Liverpool	73	(37)
1897–1899	Burnley	51	(29)
1899–1901	Manchester City	67	(21)
Total		321	(172)
- * Club domestic league appearances and goals

James Daniel Ross (28 March 1866 – 12 June 1902) was a Scottish footballer who played as an inside forward.

Born in Edinburgh, in the beginning of his career Ross played for Edinburgh's St Bernard's; he came to prominence as part of the Preston North End team known as "The Invincibles", who won the Football League during its first and second seasons, the first one being a double of the league and the FA Cup.

Nicknamed the "Little Demon", Ross's older brother Nick was also a footballer.

== Career ==
=== Preston North End ===
==== Pre-League era (1883–1888) ====
Jimmy Ross came south to Preston to join his famous elder brother Nick. His debut for Preston North End happened by chance – he had to gone to Padiham on 24 November 1883 as a spectator to watch his brother play but, as the team were a couple of men short, he was invited to play. He scored two goals in North End's 4–0 win. Ross was a phenomenal goalscorer. In the four seasons up to the formation of the Football League in 1888, he scored over 250 goals in only 220 appearances, including in a Lancashire Senior Cup final.

Born in Edinburgh, he was unlucky not to have been chosen for his country as the Scottish Football Association selectors only chose from players at clubs north of the border at the time. Ross formed a highly successful partnership up front for North End with England international John Goodall. He scored seven goals against Hyde United in a 26–0 win and six against Reading when North End won 18–0. Jimmy Ross appeared in the 1888 FA Cup final against West Bromwich Albion which Preston North End lost 2–1.

==== Football League debut (1888–1894) ====
Ross made his League debut on 8 September 1888 as a forward against Burnley at Preston North End's Deepdale ground. Preston won 5–2 and Ross scored the third and fourth goals. On 13 October 1888, in a League match at Deepdale against West Bromwich Albion, Ross scored in the 88th minute to put his team 3–0 up and became the first League player to score ten League goals.

Ross played in 21 of Preston's 22 League Championship matches and scored 19 goals, including four on 6 October 1888 at Deepdale against Stoke in a 7–0 win. He also scored two on four occasions: on 8 September 1888 at Deepdale against Burnley, on 29 September 1888 at County Ground in a 3–2 win against Derby County, in a 5–2 win at Pike's Lane over home team Bolton Wanderers and in a 5–0 win at Stoney Lane against home team West Bromwich Albion. Ross played in all five FA Cup ties for season 1888–89 and scored two goals including a goal in the Final at Kennington Oval on 30 March 1889 against Wolverhampton Wanderers; Preston North End won 3–0 to complete the first–ever League and FA Cup double.

=== Liverpool ===
In 1894 Ross was signed for Liverpool by the club's manager John McKenna for £75. He made his debut for his new club in a Football League Division One match on 13 September 1894 and went on to score 12 times during the season, which ended with Liverpool being relegated. A prolific goalscorer in his time at Liverpool, Ross found the Second Division defences more to his liking managing to hit the net 23 times in 25 outings, spearheading the Reds charge back to the top tier. That season he came close to gaining international recognition when the SFA relaxed their rule on English players and he was selected for the first Home Scots v Anglo-Scots trial match; however no call-up to the full team resulted.

The following season Liverpool managed to establish themselves in the First Division, finishing 5th; he only scored twice in his 21 matches.

=== Burnley ===
After his short spell at Anfield Ross was transferred out, signing for Second Division side Burnley in March 1897. There he scored 29 goals in 51 games. Just prior to his arrival, Burnley had been relegated and with Ross's help, they gained promotion back to the First Division in the 1898 test matches, ending with a 0–0 draw against Stoke, a scandal that ended test matches in English league football.

Around the fin de siècle the Football league decided to impose a maximum wage of £4 per week for professional football players. For a full-time player like Ross, able to play for wages of up to £10 a week, this was serious threat to their livelihood. To curb this threat, Ross and other top players of the time formed the Association Footballers' Union.

=== Manchester City ===
Later that year Ross joined Manchester City, scoring 21 goals in 67 games there. Ross was forced to retire from football due to ill health after the 1900–01 season. He died on 12 June 1902, aged 36.

== Professional baseball ==
In 1890, Jimmy, along with his brother, were recruited by Preston North End Baseball Club for the 1890 National League of Baseball of Great Britain, playing third base. Both brothers featured prominently for the reserve amateur team, who won the 1890 Amateur Championship Baseball Cup.

== Career statistics ==
Appearances and goals by club, season and competition
Club	Season	League			FA Cup		Test matches		Total	
Club	Season	Division	Apps	Goals	Apps	Goals	Apps	Goals	Apps	Goals
Preston North End	1887-88				7	18			7	18
Preston North End	1888–89	Football League	21	19	5	2	—		26	21
Preston North End	1889–90	Football League	21	19	3	2	—		24	21
Preston North End	1890–91	Football League	13	5	0	0	—		13	5
Preston North End	1891–92	Football League	26	16	4	2	—		30	18
Preston North End	1892–93	First Division	25	8	7	4	—		32	12
Preston North End	1893–94	First Division	24	18	2	7	1	1	27	25
Preston North End	Total		130	85	28	35	1	1	159	120
Liverpool	1894–95	First Division	27	12	3	0	1	0	31	12
Liverpool	1895–96	Second Division	25	23	2	1	4	0	31	24
Liverpool	1896–97	First Division	21	2	2	1	—		23	3
Liverpool	Total		73	37	7	2	5	0	85	39
Burnley	1896–97	First Division	4	1	—		3	0	7	1
Burnley	1897–98	Second Division	27	23	3	1	4	1	34	25
Burnley	1898–99	First Division	20	5 (Note: According to The Clarets Chronicles (2007), Ross scored six league goals: one against Bolton Wanderers, four versus Sheffield Wednesday and one against Blackburn Rovers. According to the English National Football Archive, Ross scored five league goals, four against Wednesday and one against Blackburn.)	2	1	—		22	6
Burnley	Total		51	29	5	2	7	1	63	32
Manchester City	1898–99	Second Division	9	7	—		—		9	7
Manchester City	1899–1900	First Division	26	10	1	1	—		27	11
Manchester City	1900–01	First Division	25	3	1	0	—		26	3
Manchester City	1901–02	First Division	7	1	1	0	—		8	1
Manchester City	Total		67	21	3	1	—		70	22
Career total			321	172	43	40	13	2	378	113

== Honours ==
Preston North End

- Football League: 1888–89, 1890–90
- FA Cup: 1888–89 runner-up: 1887–88

Liverpool

- Football League Second Division: 1895–96

Burnley

- Football League Second Division: 1897–98

Manchester City

- Football League Second Division: 1898–99
