= David Russell (Scottish footballer) =

Scottish footballer

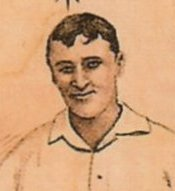
- 1889 sketch of Russell

Personal information
- Full name: David Kennedy Russell
- Date of birth: 6 July 1863
- Place of birth: Beith, Scotland
- Date of death: 18 January 1918 (aged 54)
- Place of death: Galston, Scotland
- Position: Defender

Senior career*
Years	Team	Apps	(Gls)
1882–188?	Stewarton Cunninghame		
188?–1889	Preston North End	39	(4)
1890–1892	Nottingham Forest	43	(5)
1892–1894	Ardwick	17	(3)
1895–1896	Notts County	9	(0)
Total		114	(12)
- * Club domestic league appearances and goals

David Kennedy Russell (6 July 1863 – 18 January 1918) was a Scottish footballer.

Born in Beith, Ayrshire, centre–half Russell first signed for Scottish club, Stewarton Cunninghamme in 1882. It isn't precisely recorded when he left and joined Preston North End, but it was before November 1884. He joined Preston in their pre–League days and soon gained a reputation as a strong–tackling defender. He was certainly not a player to cross, as he showed in the match against Blackburn Olympic in 1886: Russell chased an opponent down the pitch and kicked him in the back. He was the club's first–choice centre–half when the first Football League season got underway.

Playing at centre–half, made his League debut on 22 September 1888 at Deepdale in a match against Bolton Wanderers. The home team defeated the visitors 3–1. He appeared in 18 of the 22 League matches played by Preston North End in season 1888–89, and was a member of the defence that kept 12 clean–sheets and restricted the opposition to one goal on three occasions. He also played in all the FA Cup ties, scoring in the semi–final, and achieved a winner's medal in the Final which Preston won 3–0 over Wolverhampton Wanderers.

Russell played in all but one of the games the following season as Preston retained their title, and then informed the management team that he no longer wished to play for the club. He moved on to Nottingham Forest, where he spent two seasons, then moved North to Ardwick for one season (1892–93), making 19 appearances (17 League), scoring three goals.

Russell played for Notts County in season 1895–96 for one season, playing nine times. Russell's appearances for Ardwick and Notts County were in Division Two.

He died in Galston, East Ayrshire in January 1918.
