= Bob Howarth =

English footballer (1865–1938)

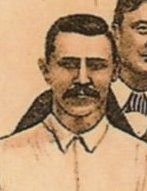
- 1889 sketch of Howarth

Personal information
- Full name: Robert Howarth
- Date of birth: 20 June 1865
- Place of birth: Preston, Lancashire, England
- Date of death: 20 August 1938 (aged 73)
- Position: Defender

Senior career*
Years	Team	Apps	(Gls)
1883–1891	Preston North End	47	(0)
1891–1894	Everton	59	(0)
1894–1899	Preston North End	3	(0)
Total		109	(0)

International career
1886–1894	England	4	(0)
- * Club domestic league appearances and goals

Bob Howarth (20 June 1865 – 20 August 1938) was an English footballer. An England international, he was a member of the Preston North End side which became known as "The Invincibles".

== Career ==
Bob Howarth was born in Preston. He joined Preston North End in 1883, and for eight years was a member of the North End side that earned the title of "The Invincibles". He was in the Preston side that were 1887–88 FA Cup Finalists. The following season, he was in the Preston side that did the double, being Football League champions and 1888–89 FA Cup winners. Howarth made his League debut on 8 September 1888 at full-back for Preston North End against Burnley at Preston North End' Deepdale ground in Preston. Preston won 5–2. Howarth played 18 of Preston' 22 League Championship matches and played in a defence-line that achieved nine clean-sheets.

In one source Howarth was described as 'a powerful and formidable full-back".

In 1891 he joined Everton, before returning to finish his career back at Preston North End. He gained several representative honours, making four appearances for England. Outside of football he worked in Preston as a solicitor.

== Professional baseball ==
Howarth played baseball professionally as an outfielder for Preston North End Baseball Club in the 1890 National League of Baseball of Great Britain, but spent much of the season with the amateur team.
