= John Goodall =

British footballer (1863–1942)

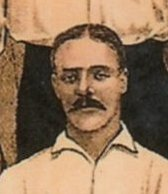
- 1889 sketch of Goodall

Personal information
- Date of birth: 19 June 1863
- Place of birth: Westminster, London, England
- Date of death: 20 May 1942 (aged 78)
- Place of death: Watford, England
- Position: Forward

Senior career*
| Years | Team | Apps | (Gls) |
- Kilmarnock Burns
| 1880–1883 | Kilmarnock Athletic | | |
| 1883–1885 | Great Lever | | |
| 1885–1889 | Preston North End | 66 | (56) |
| 1889–1899 | Derby County | 211 | (76) |
| 1899 | New Brighton Tower | 6 | (2) |
| 1901–1903 | Glossop | 35 | (8) |
| 1903–1907 | Watford | 62 | (14) |
| 1910–1912 | RC Roubaix | | |
| 1912–1913 | Mardy | | |
| Total | | 380 | (160) |

International career
| 1888–1898 | England | 14 | (12) |

Managerial career
- 1903–1910: Watford
- 1910–1912: RC Roubaix
- 1912–1913: Mardy
- * Club domestic league appearances and goals

John Goodall (19 June 1863 – 20 May 1942) was an English professional footballer who rose to fame as a centre forward for England and for Preston North End at the time of the development of the Football League, and also became Watford's first manager in 1903. He also played cricket in the County Championship for Derbyshire in 1895 and 1896, being one of 19 players to achieve the Derbyshire Double of playing cricket for Derbyshire and football for Derby County. He was also a curling player of some repute.

== Family and early life ==
He was a son of Richard, a soldier in the Scottish Fusiliers from Fishcross, near Alloa in Clackmannanshire. His mother was Mary (maiden surname of Lees), and his parents were married on 31 December 1860 in Tarbolton, Scotland. Mary Lees was a daughter of Achibald Lees and his wife Elizabeth. She was baptised at Tarbolton on 22 April 1838.

Goodall had a somewhat cosmopolitan background. He was born in London and his parents' travels were diverse enough to leave him with a younger brother, Archie, who was born in Belfast. John and Archie also had a sister named Elizabeth who was born in Edinburgh.

When he was young John Goodall would play in bare feet with a rubber ball along with his other friends. He later commented that this helped to develop his ball control skills from an early age, which benefitted him when he became a footballer.

John's father died when he was young, and by the time that the 1871 census was taken on 2 April, he was living in Kilmarnock in Ayrshire, Scotland. He was in the home listed as aged 7, with his mother Mary, a widow aged 32. And siblings Archibald age 6, and Elizabeth age 4. The address was 13, Glencairn Square.

When Goodall left school he became an iron turner and later worked at the Glenfield Works in Kilmarnock.

His mother married Joseph Barnes in 1880 at Kilmarnock.

== Club career ==
=== Early career ===
Goodall played for Kilmarnock Burns, and then got into the second eleven team of Kilmarnock Athletic. He made his first team debut for Kilmarnock Athletic in September 1880 in a 3–1 victory over Mauchline, at Holm Quarry Park, Kilmarnock. He scored four goals in Kilmarnock Athletic's 7–1 win over Ayr on 17 September 1881 in a first round match of the 1881–82 Scottish Cup played at Kilmarnock. In December 1881 he scored three goals for Ayrshire against Renfrewshire at Paisley, and his performance was reviewed very positively in the Athletic News. On 28 January 1882, at Cliftonville in north Belfast, he played on the right wing for Ayrshire again, this time against a team composed of players representing the Belfast and district football association. Ayrshire won the game 12–0 and John Goodall scored a goal. On 18 February 1882, Kilmarnock Athletic played in the semi-final of the Scottish Cup against Queen's Park F.C. at Hampden Park. Kilmarnock Athletic lost 3–2. But John Goodall gave a very creditable performance.

On 17 March 1883 his team played a replayed semi-final of the 1882–83 Scottish Cup, but lost 2–0 at home against Vale of Leven.

He represented Ayrshire again on 19 November 1883 at Kilmarnock in a match against a Lancashire representative team. Ayrshire won 6–3, and after the game Goodall was described in one review as being the best forward in the county.

Having played for Kilmarnock Athletic, he later joined the Scotch Professor exodus south and ended up at Great Lever. Kilmarnock Athletic played two matches in Lancashire in December 1883. The first was on 22 December 1883 against Great Lever, which resulted in a 3–1 win for Kilmarnock Athletic at the Great Lever ground in Bolton. Goodall scored one goal. They then played against Preston North End at Deepdale on 24 December 1883 and lost 4–1. This was the last game that John Goodall played for Kilmarnock Athletic. Along with Lucas, and Walkinshaw of Kilmarnock Athletic, John Goodall decided he did not want to return with his team back to Scotland and decided to stay in Lancashire joining the Great Lever Team because he could earn better wages in England.

His first appearance for Great Lever took place on 29 December 1883 in a game against Halliwell. During the 1883–1884 season Great Lever played 45 matches. Of these, 35 were won, 8 were lost and 2 drawn. And with the help of John Goodall, the team became renowned for scoring lots of goals. They scored 180 goals and conceded 68.

On 6 September 1884 at Great Lever in a 4–2 win for his team, he scored a goal against Blackburn Rovers. A week later he scored four goals at Great Lever in a 6–0 win over Derby County. On 17 November 1884 at Preston, he made an appearance for Preston North End, his future club, and scored a goal in a 3–1 win against Burnley. Both teams had the assistance of players from outside their usual elevens on this day. Goodall scored many goals for the Leverites, and by the end of 1884 was being described as the best forward in Lancashire. He struck four goals against Walsall Swifts on 31 January 1885 in a 7–0 win at the Great Lever ground in Bolton.

His last match for Great Lever took place on 16 May 1885 at home against Bolton Wanderers F.C. and ended in a 1–1 draw. It came just a few days after the same team had defeated the Leverites 5–1 in the final of the Bolton Charity Cup.

=== Preston North End ===
==== 1885–1888 ====
It was only by the sheer determination of representatives from Preston North End, that John Goodall agreed to play for them. He had been persuaded to join Bolton Wanderers F.C. He was at the club's headquarters when Ramsay, one of his teammates from Great Lever, came into the room and said he wanted to speak to him. When he got outside, there were two people from Preston North End. They bundled John Goodall into a cab, sent him to the nearest station and went to Preston via Blackburn. The Bolton representatives worked out what had happened but ended up going to the wrong station. Goodall joined Preston North End in August 1885 at the beginning of the 1885–86 season. He claimed a goal in the first game of that season at Preston on 22 August 1885 in a 7–0 win over Wednesbury Old Athletic.

On 17 August 1887, he scored nine goals in North End's 16–2 win in a friendly match away against Dundee Strathmore. When North End beat Hyde F.C. 26–0 on 15 October 1887, John Goodall only claimed the last goal. This may in part be due to the fact that he was playing at half-back in the game. That season, 1887–88 Preston North end reached the 1888 FA Cup Final. It was played at Kennington Oval on 24 March 1888 against West Bromwich Albion, John Goodall played centre–forward. North End lost 2–1.

==== 1888–89 season ====
John Goodall made his League debut on 8 September 1888 as a forward for Preston North End against Burnley at the Deepdale ground in Preston. Preston won 5–2. John Goodall played in 21 of Preston' 22 League Championship matches. As a forward he played in a front–line that scored three or more goals on 13 separate occasions. John Goodall scored 20 League goals in 1888–1889. His debut League goal was scored on 15 September 1888 at Dudley Road, the then home of Wolverhampton Wanderers. Preston North End won 4–0. His 20 goals included two hat–tricks. The first was scored on 27 October 1888 at Deepdale, the visitors were Wolverhampton Wanderers. Goodall scored Preston' first, third and fourth in a 5–2 win. The second was scored on 3 November 1888 at Trent Bridge, the then home of Notts County. Goodall scored Preston' first, third and seventh goals in a 7–0 win over the home team. John Goodall scored two–goals–in–a–match on four occasions. Two against Derby County on 8 December 1888 in a 5–0 win at Deepdale; two against Everton on 22 December 1888 in a 3–0 win at Deepdale; two against West Bromwich Albion on 26 December 1888 in a 5–0 win at Stoney Lane, the then home of West Bromwich Albion and two against Notts County on 5 January 1889 in a 4–1 win at Deepdale. 20 goals in a League Season was the Football League record as that was the first season of League football. John Goodall played in all five FA Cup ties in season 1888–89. He played in the Final at Kennington Oval on 30 March 1889 at centre–forward. His team defeated Wolverhampton Wanderers 3–0. He scored two goals in the earlier rounds making it 22 for the season.

At Preston, Goodall had assumed the responsibility of organising the attack and carried the side's development a stage further by instigating many ploys that would never have otherwise become part of the team's repertoire. By the time of his departure to Derby County, he had achieved all he could hope to do at Deepdale. Goodall made 56 first–team appearance for Preston North End, 21 in the League and he scored 56 goals for the club, 20 in the League.

=== Derby County ===
Goodall left Preston North End for Derby County in 1889 at the height of his fame. His brother Archie a centre-half, played alongside John at Derby County.

It was at Derby County where the older Goodall became a mentor to Stephen Bloomer, the best goal scorer of that generation, from the start of the 1892–93 season. Bloomer credited Goodall with his early development. And partly as a result of this combination, the 'Rams' came strongly to the fore but were never quite able to convert their talents into silverware finishing third in the League twice, runners-up once (in 1895), FA Cup semi-finalists twice, and runners-up once (in 1898).

He played his last game for Derby County on 8 April 1899 in a 4–0 league defeat away at Liverpool. It was commented in the Derby Daily Telegraph that he could not keep pace with such fast men in the Liverpool team as Alex Raisbeck and others.

Goodall did not feature in the 1899 FA Cup Final as he was by now fading as a first-time fixture at the Baseball Ground.

In October 1899 he was taken on by New Brighton Tower, a club based in the Wirral, that pursued an expensive policy of buying ex-internationals in order to strengthen their League status. However, he only played six games with this team.

=== Glossop ===
On 30 January 1901, John Goodall signed for Glossop in Derbyshire, who were in the Second Division. He was a player-manager of the team and moved to the village in the following month. He made his debut playing outside left for the team in a match at home against Burslem Port Vale, on Saturday 8 February 1901. The match had been postponed from the previous Saturday on account of that day being the funeral of Queen Victoria.

=== Watford: Player/manager ===
John Goodall moved with his wife to Hertfordshire in 1903 where he took up a position as the first player/manager of Watford of the Southern League.

A reporter for the Watford Observervisited Goodall in May 1903, as he prepared for the new season and, in part, wrote this:

Asked as to the prospects in Watford, the new manager saw no reason why Watford, with its good central position and great railway facilities, should not be able to turn out a team to occupy a respectable position on the Southern League ladder.

The moment we got away from the subject of Watford you could hear the rumbling of curling stones, the swish of cricket balls, the rippling of waters "willow-wooed," and the swipes of drivers in the royal and ancient game of "gowf". Of Goodall's fishing one need say no more than that he is an angler.

But John's achievements in the roaring game cannot be passed over. While at Preston he was the champion curler, and once when playing against the best of Scotia's curlers in the championship of Great Britain at Southport, he ran out second.

With reference to the game of golf, Goodall knows all about long drives and good approaches, bunkers, and other hazards; the secret of keeping your eye on the ball is his, and the language thereof! Pigeon shooting also claimed his attention.

The gentler game of bowling has attracted him of a summer's evening and he can put a bowl to lie dead on the jack when required. In the cricket field he has kept wicket for Derby County against Yorkshire and Warwickshire.

In the new manager, Watford have a man who can be relied upon at all times to give a good account of himself in any position, but more particularly in the van.

He made an immediate impact at Watford. The club broke various records in winning Division Two of the Southern League in 1903–04. They went through the campaign undefeated, recording the highest FA Cup victory in the club's history (6–0 versus Redhill 31 October 1903) and having both the highest season goal scorer, Bertie Banks, (21 goals) and single game goal scorer, Harry Barton, (6 goals v. Wycombe Wanderers 26 September 1903) in the club's history.

During the 1904–1905 season John Goodall was top scorer for Watford, getting 18 goals from the 42 games that he played for them. Watford played a total of 53 games in that season. He was captain of the team and developed younger players such as George Badenoch.

Goodall played his last football game for Watford on 14 September 1907 at the age of 44 years, 87 days in a Southern League game against Bradford Park Avenue, becoming the oldest person ever to have played for Watford.

== International career ==
John Goodall qualified to play for England even though both of his parents were born in Scotland, and he was brought up there from a young age. The reason for this was because at the time he played international football, a rule existed which stipulated that a player was only eligible to play for the country in which he was born. His brother Archie Goodall was born in Belfast, and for this reason it qualified Archie to play for Ireland. He made his debut on 4 February 1888 in a match against Wales. The match was played at the Alexandra ground in Crewe, and England won 5–1. John Goodall scored on his debut. His second international appearance was on 17 March 1888 at Hampden Park against Scotland. England won 5–0 and John Goodall scored the fourth goal. On 23 February 1889 at Victoria Ground Goodall scored in a 4–1 victory over Wales. Then on 13 April 1889 he played for England against Scotland but ended on the losing side. Scotland winning 3–2 at Kennington Oval.

In all, Goodall was capped six times versus Wales, seven times against Scotland, and once against Ireland, scoring 12 goals. He saw his last international in 1898 having appeared at inside right, centre forward, and inside left during his time as an England player.

== Career statistics ==
=== Manager ===
| Team | From | To | Record | | | | |
| Team | From | To | G | W | D | L | Win % |
|---|---|---|---|---|---|---|---|
| Watford | May 1903 | May 1910 | 253 | 91 | 64 | 98 | 35.97 |
| Total | | | 144 | 61 | 33 | 50 | 42.36 |

== Cricket ==
John Goodall played first-class cricket twice for Derbyshire. In the 1895 season he made his debut in a match against Yorkshire in June when he scored a healthy 32 in his second innings to help Derbyshire to victory. In the 1896 season he kept wicket against Warwickshire in July, taking one catch in another victory for Derbyshire. During his time at Glossop, he played for the cricket team at times in the 1900–1901 season in the Central Lancashire League.

While at Watford he played five cricket matches for Hertfordshire County Cricket Club in 1905 and 1906.

== Personal life ==
He married Sarah Rawcliffe on 4 January 1887 at All Saints Church, Preston. At this stage, he was still working as an iron turner. Sarah was born in Poulton-le-Fylde, near Blackpool.

== Later years ==
He left Watford in May 1910. In the next month he was appointed as the Coach of RC Roubaix for the 1910–11 season. In May 1912 he was appointed as manager of Mardy. John played for Mardy away at Swansea Town on 18 January 1913. This was his last ever appearance as a player. By the end of that season however, Mardy were unable to keep Goodall. The Mardy ground was one of the worst in Wales, they had not played well that season and needed a new ground.

He became the groundsman of West Herts Sports Club at the Cassio Road enclosure in Watford. While at this post in 1927 he became ill and was sent to St. George's Hospital, in London. He recovered and in November 1928 gave an interview to the Athletic News, giving some details about his life and playing career and opinions on training methods in football.

On 29 September 1939, he was living at 20, Longspring, Watford. He was a retired cricket groundsman.

== Death ==
He died in Watford on 20 May 1942. The Lancashire Evening Post detailed his qualities as a footballer in an obituary:

He can be described, I think, as the finest centre forward in history, although he played in a number of his international matches as inside right, and his qualities as a schemer, a subtle finisher, and a scrupulously gentlemanly player are universally acknowledged.

Goodall was buried at Vicarage Road Cemetery, at first in an unmarked grave but in May 2018, Watford FC provided a headstone adorned with the club crest and text recording Goodall's many sporting achievements.

== Goalscoring record in Football League ==
Club appearances and goals by season

| Season | Rank | Club | Division | Goals | Matches | Goals Ratio | League position |
|---|---|---|---|---|---|---|---|
| 1888–89 | 1st | Preston North End | First Division | 20 | 21 | 0.95 | Champions |
| 1889–90 | ? | Derby County | First Division | 5 | 15 | 0.33 | 7th |
| 1890–91 | 8th | Derby County | First Division | 13 | 20 | 0.65 | 11th |
| 1891–92 | 11th | Derby County | First Division | 15 | 22 | 0.68 | 10th |
| 1892–93 | 12th | Derby County | First Division | 13 | 25 | 0.50 | 13th |
| 1893–94 | ? | Derby County | First Division | 12 | 29 | 0.41 | 3rd |
| 1894–95 | ? | Derby County | First Division | 4 | 19 | 0.21 | 15th |
| 1895–96 | ? | Derby County | First Division | 1 | 25 | 0.04 | 2nd |
| 1896–97 | ? | Derby County | First Division | 3 | 23 | 0.13 | 3rd |
| 1897–98 | 23rd | Derby County | First Division | 9 | 19 | 0.41 | 10th |
| 1898–99 | ? | Derby County | First Division | 1 | 14 | 0.07 | 9th |
| 1899–1900 | ? | Derby County | First Division | ? | ? | ? | 6th |
| 1899–1900 | ? | New Brighton Tower | Second Division | 2 | 6 | 0.33 | 4th |
| 1900-01 | ? | Glossop North End | Second Division | ? | ? | ? | 5th |
| 1901–02 | ? | Glossop North End | Second Division | ? | ? | ? | 8th |
| 1902–03 | ? | Glossop North End | Second Division | ? | ? | ? | 11th |

== See also ==
- List of English cricket and football players
