= John McLellan (footballer) =

Scottish footballer

Personal information
- Full name: John McLellan
- Date of birth: 1867
- Place of birth: Edinburgh, Scotland
- Position: Defender

Senior career*
Years	Team	Apps	(Gls)
1887–1888	Heart of Midlothian		
1888–1893	Accrington	101	(0)
1893	Bacup		
- * Club domestic league appearances and goals

John McLellan, (Some sources state his surname was McLennan) known as Jack McLellan, was a Scottish footballer who played in the English Football League for Accrington.

Jack McLellan was a professional player with a fine kick and tackle. His first club was Hearts from his native Edinburgh. He signed for Hearts in 1887 and moved to England the following year.

== Season 1888-89 ==
Jack McLennan, playing as a full–back, made his Accrington and League debut on 8 September 1888, at Anfield, the then home of Everton. Accrington lost the match 2–1. Jack McLennan appeared in 19 of the 22 League matches played by Accrington in season 1888–89. Jack McLennan played full–back/centre–half (18 at full–back) in an Accrington defence that achieved two clean–sheets and restricted the opposition to one–League–goal–in–a–match on five occasions. On 20 October 1888 John McLellan, playing as a full–back was part of a defence that prevented The Invincibles Preston North End from scoring. Preston North End played 27 League and FA Cup matches in Season 1888-89 and their visit to Accrington was the only time they failed to score a goal. Jack McLellan also appeared in two FA Cup ties playing both at centre–half. In the first match, played at Thorneyholme Road, the home of Accrington, the Accrington defence restricted Blackburn Rovers to one goal in a 1–1 draw.

== Season 1889-90 ==
In season 1889–90 Accrington had their best season, finishing sixth in the League and McLennan was an ever–present (along with Johnny Kirkham). He also played in all three Accrington FA Cup ties. He played Left Full-Back in every match. Although Accrington had a solid mid-table season what let them down, and McLennan was part of this, was a leaky defence. They conceded 56 League goals, only three teams performing worse.

In season 1890–91 McLellan only appeared in 14 League matches (Accrington finishing tenth) while appearing again in three FA Cup ties. In season 1891–92 the Football League was expanded to 14 Clubs and McLellan played in all 26 matches with Accrington finishing 11th. Again he appeared in three FA Cup ties. In 1892–93 the Football League split into two Divisions and Accrington were in Division One. Accrington finished 15th and were relegated and the club folded. McLellan appeared 20 times in the League and twice in the FA Cup.

Jack McLellan signed for Bacup in 1893 having been on the books of Accrington for the five seasons they were Football League members. He was one of two players to play for Accrington from 1888 to 1893. The other was Jack Kirkham. He appeared in 114 matches (101 Football League + 13 FA Cup). There is no apparent record of when he died.

== Statistics ==
Appearances and goals by club, season and competition
Club	Season	League			FA Cup		Total	
Club	Season	Division	Apps	Goals	Apps	Goals	Apps	Goals
Accrington	1888–89	The Football League	19	0	2	0	21	0
Accrington	1889–90	Football League	22	0	3	0	25	0
Accrington	1890–91	Football League	14	0	3	0	17	0
Accrington	1891–92	Football League	26	0	3	0	29	0
Accrington	1892–93	First Division	20	0	2	0	22	0
