= John Stevenson (footballer, born 1861) =

Scottish footballer

Personal information
- Full name: John Stevenson
- Date of birth: 10 December 1861
- Place of birth: Calton, Glasgow, Scotland
- Date of death: 10 April 1941 (aged 79)
- Position: Full back

Senior career*
Years	Team	Apps	(Gls)
1880–1888	Arthurlie		
1888–1893	Accrington	81	(0)
- * Club domestic league appearances and goals

John Stevenson, born 10 December 1861, in Calton, Glasgow a district in the City of Glasgow. He was a Scottish footballer who played in the English Football League for Accrington after, starting with Arthurlie F.C., a club based in Barrhead, South-West Scotland.

== Season 1888-89 ==
Stevenson made his debut in the inaugural Football League season on 8 September 1888, at Anfield, then home of Everton. Accrington lost the match 2–1. Stevenson played in all 22 League matches played by Accrington in season 1888–89 (he was one of two players who did so, the other being John Horne), and also played in both FA Cup matches played by the club. He played at full–back in a defensive line that kept two clean-sheets and limited the opposition to one goal on five occasions. Accrington finished 7th in the League on Goal Average above Everton. On 20 October 1888, Stevenson was part of a defence that prevented 'The Invincibles' of Preston North End from scoring; Preston played 27 League and FA Cup matches in that season and their visit to Accrington was the only time they failed to score a goal. Stevenson played five seasons for Accrington, retiring at the end of the 1892–93 season.

== Season 1889-90 ==
John Stevenson only missed one League match for Accrington in Season 1889-90 playing 21 matches at Right Full-Back. He played in a team that finished sixth (highest ever League position in Football League for Accrington) but the defence struggled. The team conceded 56 goals, the fourth worst defence in the Football League in Season 1889–90. He played all three Accrington FA Cup matches played by Accrington with Stevenson scoring a rare goal in a 3–1 home win over West Bromwich Albion. The match was a First Round tie. The match had to be replayed as West Bromwich Albion protested at the state of the Thorneyholme Road pitch. The match was played on 18 January 1890. There is a Lancashire Evening Post Newspaper article that makes a brief reference to Stevenson' goal. Accrington were 1–0 down. The goal came about from a corner initially cleared by Albion. At the end of the Season Stevenson had made 43 (out of 44) League Appearances for Accrington, the club record.

In the earlier part of his career with Arthurlie, he was selected for a trial match for the Scotland national team in 1881, though no further call-ups followed.

== Statistics ==
Appearances and goals by club, season and competition
Club	Season	League			FA Cup		Total	
Club	Season	Division	Apps	Goals	Apps	Goals	Apps	Goals
Accrington	1888–89	English Football League	22	0	2	0	24	0
Accrington	1889–90	Football League	21	0	3	1	24	1
Accrington	1890–91	Football League	4	0	0	0	4	0
Accrington	1891–92	Football League	13	0	3	0	16	0
Accrington	1892–93	First Division	21	0	2	0	23	0
