= Henry Parkinson (footballer, born 1864) =

English footballer

Personal information
- Date of birth: 3 December 1864
- Place of birth: Accrington, England
- Date of death: 1941 (aged 76–77)
- Position: Half-back

Senior career*
Years	Team	Apps	(Gls)
1887	Bell's Temperance		
1888	Everton	1	(0)
1889	Accrington	1	(0)
- * Club domestic league appearances and goals

Henry Parkinson, known as Harry Parkinson, was an English footballer who played in The Football League for Everton then moved to Accrington. He first signed for Bell's Temperance Football Club in 1887. This was an Accrington based Football Club who played in the 1880s and 1890s competing in the FA Cup.

== Everton ==
Harry Parkinson was described as a well built half-back reserve player.

== League & Everton Debut ==
George Farmer was Everton's regular left-half in 1888–1889. However, for the trip to play Accrington on 29 December 1888 Farmer was either injured or, unavailable. This led to Harry Parkinson' debut at left-half against Accrington at the latter' Thorneyholme Road ground. Everton won the toss and elected to let Accrington kick-off into the low December sun. It seemed to pay off as Everton' William Brown scored to put Everton 1-0 ahead. Both teams had opportunities with both goalkeepers, Johnny Horne and Charles Jolliffe called into action but Accrington got a free-kick and scored to make it 1–1 at half-time. Accrington dominated the second-half, scored twice and were comfortable winners 3–1. That was Parkinson' only appearance for Everton.

== Accrington Debut ==
At sometime during 1889 Accrington signed Parkinson. Towards the end of the season regular left-half Luther Pemberton was injured and missed the last three games. For the visit of Bolton Wanderers on 23 March 1889 Harry Parkinson got his chance to cover for Pemberton when stand-in James Tattersall was moved back to centre-half. Accrington dominated the first-half but only had a Billy Barbour goal to show for all their pressure at half-time. Accrington were to rue their missed chances as within four minutes of the restart Bolton were 2–1 up. Not long after Bolton took the lead Jack Kirkham of Accrington equalised. It looked like finishing a draw but right at the end Bolton nicked the winner. Parkinson never played for Accrington or League football again.

== Playing Record ==
He played once for Everton and assisted them to finish eighth in the League scoring 35 goals, the second lowest during that first season and conceding 47. He played once for Accrington and assisted them to finish seventh in the League scoring 48 and conceding 48.
