= Jonathan Wilkinson (footballer) =

English footballer (1859–1934)

Personal information
- Full name: Jonathan Thomas Wilkinson
- Date of birth: Q2 1859
- Place of birth: Haslingden, England
- Date of death: 1934 (aged 74–75)
- Position: Defender

Senior career*
Years	Team	Apps	(Gls)
1883–1884	Blackpool		
1884–1885	Accrington Grasshoppers F.C.		
1885–1886	Peel Bank F.C.		
1888–1890	Accrington	6	(0)
- * Club domestic league appearances and goals

Jonathan Wilkinson (1859–1934) was an English footballer who played in The Football League for Accrington.

Before Wilkinson joined Accrington he played for three clubs. In 1883 he signed for Blackpool F.C.. Today's Blackpool is not the Blackpool Wilkinson joined. Today's Blackpool was founded in 1887 but one source indicates Blackburn Rovers played a Blackpool club in 1880.

In the 1884–85 season Wilkinson played for a club called Accrington Grasshoppers F.C. There is no information about this club.

In the final three years before Wilkinson joined Accrington he signed and played for a club called Peel Bank F.C. (there is no data on this club).

== Season 1888–89 ==
Jonathan Wilkinson made his League debut at centre-half with Accrington at Anfield, then home of Everton, on 8 September 1888. Accrington lost 2–1. Wilkinson played four League matches for Accrington in season 1888–89 in various positions. Wilkinson played centre-half in a defence-line that kept one clean-sheet. He also played wing-half in a midfield that assisted Accrington to a big ( three-League-goals-or-more) win once. He also played centre-forward in a front-line that scored three-League-goals-or-more in a match once. When he played for Accrington at Thorneyholme Road, the home of Accrington, on 20 October 1888, Jonathan Wilkinson was approximately 29 years 158 days old; that made him, on that sixth weekend of League football, Accrington's oldest player. Another achievement on 20 October 1888 was Jonathan Wilkinson, playing at centre-half and was part of a defence that prevented The Invincibles Preston North end from scoring. Preston North End played 27 League and FA Cup matches in Season 1888-89 and their visit to Accrington was the only time they failed to score a goal.

== Season 1889–90 ==
Jonathan Wilkinson' second season was the most successful as Accrington finished sixth in the Football League. Wilkinson played one (out of 22 League matches), playing at right-half in the final match of the season, a 2–2 draw with Preston North End, the 1889–90 League Champions played at Thorneyholme Road, Accrington on 15 March 1890. He scored no goals. Wilkinson also played in one of the three FA Cup ties played by Accrington that Season. Accrington had already beaten West Bromwich Albion 3-1 at Thorneyholme Road. A First Round tie played on 18 January 1890. West Bromwich Albion protested to the FA about the state of the Thorneyholme Road pitch. The FA agreed the match would be replayed and so, on 25 January 1890 the match was replayed at Thorneyholme Road, Wilkinson played at centre-half and Accrington won 3–0. At the end of the season he had made five Football League appearances in his Career, all for Accrington, and scored 0 League goals.

== Statistics ==
Club	Season	Division	League		FA Cup		Total	
Club	Season	Division	Apps	Goals	Apps	Goals	Apps	Goals
Accrington	1888–89	English Football League	4	0	-	-	4	0
Accrington	1889–90	Football League	1	0	1	0	2	0
Accrington	1890–91	Football League	1	0	-	-	1	0
