= Bob Brand =

Scottish footballer

Personal information
- Full name: Robert Brand
- Date of birth: 3 August 1865
- Place of birth: Cambusnethan, Wishaw, Scotland
- Date of death: 1943 (aged 77–78)
- Position: Forward

Senior career*
Years	Team	Apps	(Gls)
1886–1887	Queen of the South Wanderers		
1887	Rangers		
1887-1888	Hearts		
1888	Queen of the South Wanderers		
1888–1889	Accrington	16	(11)
1889	Sunderland Albion		
1889	Accrington	2	(0)
1890	Derby County	3	(0)
- * Club domestic league appearances and goals

Robert Brand was a Scottish footballer who played in the English Football League for Accrington and Derby County. He was born in Cambusnethan, a village on the edge of Wishaw in Scotland. Bob Brand first came to prominence, as a footballer, in 1886 when he signed for Queen of the South Wanderers. According to the Wikipedia article the season Brand joined and played for Queen of the South Wanderers was when they had a substantial Scottish Cup run and were investigated and suspended for having professional footballers. According to one source Bob Brand spent the 1887-88 season as a wanderer playing for Rangers, Hearts and back to Queen of the South Wanderers.

Bob Brand, playing as a winger, made his Accrington and League debut on 22 September 1888 at County Ground the then home of Derby County. The match ended as a 1–1 draw and Bob Brand scored on his debut by putting Accrington 1–0 ahead.

== Season 1888-89 ==
Bob Brand appeared in 16 of the 22 League matches in season 1888–89 and scored 11 goals. Brand, playing as a winger (16 appearances) appeared in an Accrington midfield that achieved big (three—League—goals—or—more) wins twice. Of the 11 League goals scored by Brand five were scored in two matches. On 29 September 1888, at Victoria Ground, the then home of Stoke, Brand scored two as Accrington defeated the home team 4–2. Then, on 13 October 1888 at Thorneyholme Road, the home of Accrington, Brand scored the first Accrington League hat—trick as Accrington defeated the visitors, Derby County, 6–2.

In January 1889, Brand moved to Sunderland Albion for a match against Sunderland. Brand came back to Accrington and played at the end of the season and returned to Sunderland Albion in season 1889–90.

== Season 1889-90 ==
Brand played most of the season for Sunderland Albion and only played two League matches for Accrington, the last two League matches of the season.

In 1890–91, Brand left Accrington and moved to Derby County for season 1890–91. He only played three League matches for Derby County and then, in 1891 he returned to Sunderland Albion.

== Statistics ==
Club	Season	Division	League		FA Cup		Total	
Club	Season	Division	Apps	Goals	Apps	Goals	Apps	Goals
Accrington	1888–89	The Football League	16	11	-	-	16	11
Accrington	1889–90	Football League	2	0	-	-	2	0
Derby County	1890–91	Football League	3	0	-	-	3	0
