= James Tattersall =

English footballer

Personal information
- Full name: James Tattersall
- Date of birth: 3 June 1867
- Place of birth: Accrington
- Date of death: 1941 (aged 73–74)
- Position: Defender

Senior career*
Years	Team	Apps	(Gls)
1888–1893	Accrington	100	(2)
- Southport Central
- * Club domestic league appearances and goals

James Tattersall was an English footballer who played in the Football League for Accrington.

James Tattersall was born on 3 June 1867 in Accrington.

== Season 1888-89 ==
James Tattersall signed for Accrington, probably in 1888. (There is no record of the exact date) James Tattersall, playing at wing—half, made his League and (possibly Club) debut on 22 September 1888 at the County Ground, the then home of Derby County. The match ended as a 1–1 draw. James Tattersall appeared in 17 of the 22 League matches played by Accrington in season 1888–89. James Tattersall, playing at centre—half (14 appearances), played in a defence that achieved one clean—sheet and restricted the opposition to one—League—goal—in—a—match on four separate occasions.

== Season 1889-90 ==
James Tattersall second season was the most successful as Accrington finished sixth in the Football League. Tattersall played 21 (out of 22 League matches), 20 at Left-Half and one at Right-Half. He did not score a goal. He also played at Left-Half in all three FA Cup ties. At the end of the season he had made 38 Football League appearances, all for Accrington.

James Tattersall remained a key figure in the Accrington set—up until the club' demise in 1893. He made another 83 League appearances from 1889 to 1893 scoring two League goals. He also played nine FA Cup ties from 1889 to 1893. When he left Accrington to join Southport Central Tattersall had played 100 League matches, scoring two and 11 FA Cup ties.

== Statistics ==
Club	Season	Division	League		FA Cup		Total	
Club	Season	Division	Apps	Goals	Apps	Goals	Apps	Goals
Accrington	1888–89	English Football League	17	0	2	0	19	0
Accrington	1889–90	Football League	21	0	3	0	24	0
Accrington	1890–91	Football League	19	0	3	0	22	0
Accrington	1891–92	Football League	25	2	1	0	26	2
Accrington	1892–93	First Division	18	0	2	0	20	0
