= Peter Chippendale =

English footballer

Personal information
- Full name: Peter Chippendale
- Date of birth: 17 April 1862
- Place of birth: Church, England
- Date of death: 1941 (aged 78–79)
- Position: Defender

Senior career*
Years	Team	Apps	(Gls)
1887-1888	Church F.C.		
1888–1889	Accrington	6	(1)
- * Club domestic league appearances and goals

Peter Chippendale (17 April 1862 – 1941) was an English footballer who played in The Football League as a centre-half for Accrington.

== Early career ==
Signed by a home town club Church ( age 24/25) in 1887, he played for Church in their last season of existence. The founding of the League in 1888 took ticket paying fans away from small clubs like Church saw them disappear. Peter Chippendale moved to one of the founding clubs of the League, just two miles up the road at Accrington.

== Season 1888-89 ==
Peter Chippendale joined Accrington in 1888. Peter Chippendale was part of Accrington' first ever League team making his/their debut on 8 September 1888, at Anfield Road, then home of Everton. (Metcalf) covered the match in the report of The Liverpool Mercury of 10 September 1888. Peter Chippendale played at Outside-Left and from the newspaper had a good game having several shots at the Everton goal which were foiled by Everton defenders. Accrington lost the match 2–1. Peter Chippendale kept his place in the Accrington team for their second League match on 15 September 1888. He was moved to the defence centre-half in a team that conceded five in a 5-5 draw at Leamington Road, the then home of Blackburn Rovers. The Lancashire Evening Post reported the match and described that Chippendale scored his debut and only League goal by putting in a corner taken by George Haworth. Chippendale played four more matches for Accrington, all at centre-half. Accrington won two of those four matches.

== Season 1889-90 ==
Peter Chippendale did not play any League matches in 1889-90. He made one first team appearance in the FA Cup. On 25 January 1890 Accrington had a home First Round Replay with West Bromwich Albion. The first match was also played at Thorneyholme Road and Accrington won 3-1. However, West Bromwich Albion protested, successfully, at the state of the pitch and F.A. ordered the match to be replayed. In the Replay Peter Chippendale came in for Arthur Wilkinson and Accrington won 3-0. That was his last game for a League Club.

He became a printer at Broadoak, Accrington until his retirement and died in 1941.

== Statistics ==
Club	Season	Division	League		FA Cup		Total	
Club	Season	Division	Apps	Goals	Apps	Goals	Apps	Goals
Accrington	1888–89	The Football League	6	1	-	-	6	1
Accrington	1889–90	Football League	-	-	1	0	1	0
