= Sunderland A.F.C. league record by opponent =

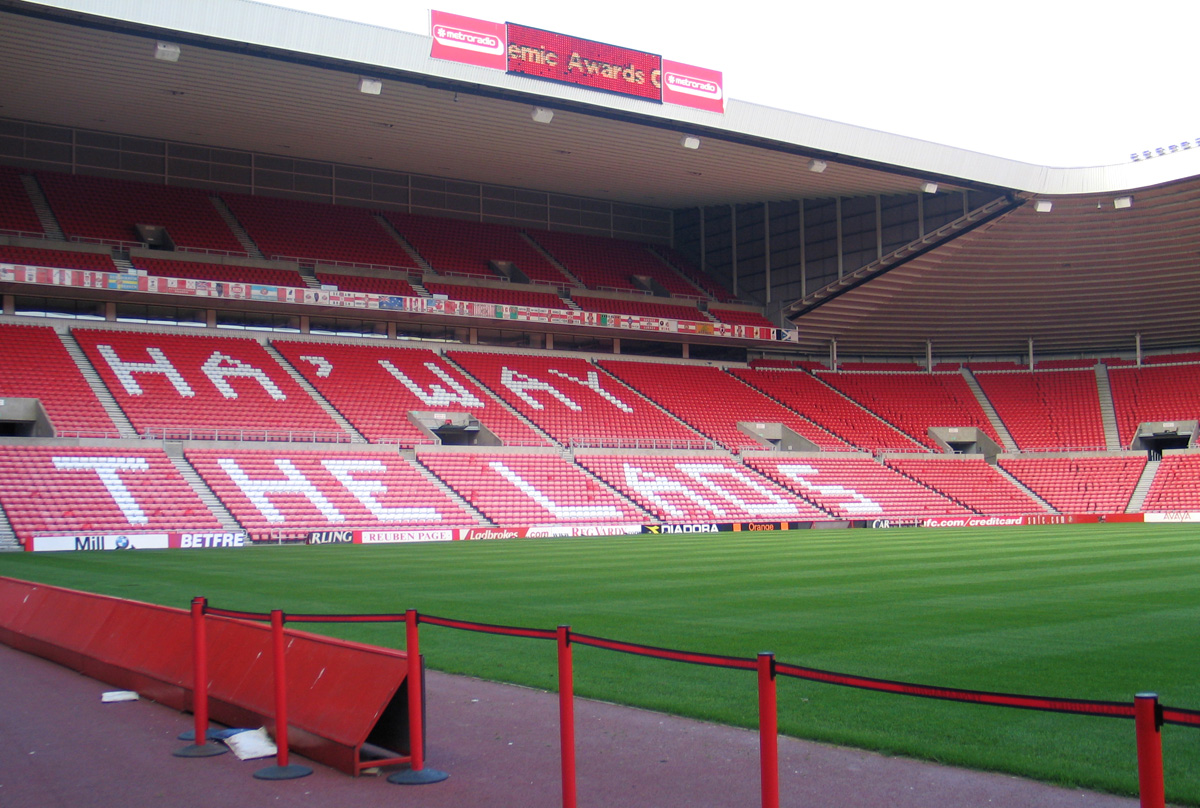
Sunderland have played home league games at the Stadium of Light since 1997.

Sunderland Association Football Club, an English association football club based in Sunderland, Tyne and Wear, was founded in 1879. They joined The Football League in the 1890–91 season replacing Stoke who had failed to be re-elected, making Sunderland the first new club to join the league since its inauguration in 1888. Sunderland remained in the football league for 106 years, albeit in different divisions, until 1996 when they were promoted to the Premier League, which replaced the Football League's First Division at the top of the English football league system in 1992. Since then the club has been relegated back into The Football League on four occasions. They currently compete in the EFL Championship after promotion from EFL League One in the 2021–22 season.

Sunderland's first team, nicknamed the Black Cats, have competed in a number of nationally contested leagues, and their record against each club faced in those competitions is summarised below. Sunderland played their inaugural league fixture as part of the 1890–91 Football League on 13 September 1890 against Burnley. They met their most recent different league opponent, Morecambe, for the first time in the 2021–22 EFL League One season.

The team that Sunderland have played most in league competition is Aston Villa, against whom they have contested 170 league matches. Villa, Newcastle United and West Bromwich Albion have contested the most draws with Sunderland, having tied 44 games. The Black Cats have won 65 of the league matches against Everton and Stoke City which represents the most they have won against any club. Everton are also the teams to defeat Sunderland the most with 73 wins over them.

== Key ==
- The table includes results of matches played by Sunderland in the Football League and the Premier League.
- For the sake of simplicity, present-day names are used throughout: for example, results against Newton Heath, Small Heath and Woolwich Arsenal are integrated into the records against Manchester United, Birmingham City and Arsenal, respectively
- † Teams with this background and symbol in the "Club" column are competing in the 2023–24 EFL Championship alongside Sunderland
- ‡ Clubs with this background and symbol in the "Club" column are defunct
- P = matches played; W = matches won; D = matches drawn; L = matches lost; F = Goals scored (For); A = Goals conceded (Against); Win% = percentage of total matches won
- The columns headed "First" and "Last" contain the first and most recent seasons in which Sunderland played league matches against each opponent

== All-time league record ==
Statistics correct as of matches played on 4 May 2024.

Sunderland A.F.C. league record by opponent
Club	Home				Away				Total						Win%	First	Last	Note(s)
Club	P	W	D	L	P	W	D	L	P	W	D	L	F	A	Win%	First	Last	Note(s)
Accrington ‡	3	2	1	0	3	2	0	1	6	4	1	1	22	12	66.67	1890–91	1892–93	
Accrington Stanley	3	1	2	0	4	3	1	0	7	4	3	0	16	8	57.14	2018–19	2021–22	(Note: Because of the COVID-19 pandemic, the 2019–20 EFL League One season was suspended in mid-March 2020. On 9 June, the clubs voted to curtail the season; Sunderland's last eight matches, which included one against this opponent, remained unplayed.)
AFC Wimbledon	4	3	1	0	3	2	1	0	7	5	2	0	12	4	71.43	2018–19	2021–22	
Aldershot ‡	1	1	0	0	1	0	0	1	2	1	0	1	5	4	50.00	1987–88	1987–88	
Arsenal	70	29	23	18	70	15	17	38	140	44	40	56	189	224	31.43	1904–05	2016–17	(Note: Record against Woolwich Arsenal included)
Aston Villa	85	39	25	21	85	15	19	51	170	54	44	72	247	272	31.76	1890–91	2017–18	
Barnsley	14	10	1	3	14	5	2	7	28	15	3	10	40	33	53.57	1958–59	2018–19	
Birmingham City †	56	37	9	10	56	15	13	28	112	52	22	38	178	141	46.43	1894–95	2023–24	(Note: Record against Small Heath included; record against Birmingham included)
Blackburn Rovers †	66	44	8	14	66	18	18	30	132	62	26	44	226	185	46.97	1890–91	2023–24	
Blackpool	32	15	10	7	31	9	10	12	63	24	20	19	87	89	38.10	1930–31	2022–23	
Bolton Wanderers	69	42	16	11	69	15	17	37	138	57	33	48	230	196	41.30	1890–91	2021–22	
AFC Bournemouth	4	1	2	1	4	3	0	1	8	4	2	2	9	8	50.00	1988–89	2016–17	
Bradford City	20	8	9	3	20	10	2	8	40	18	11	11	57	34	45.00	1908–09	2018–19	
Bradford Park Avenue	3	2	1	0	3	0	2	1	6	2	3	1	14	9	33.33	1914–15	1920–21	
Brentford	8	4	1	3	8	4	3	1	16	8	4	4	31	25	50.00	1935–36	2017–18	
Brighton & Hove Albion	17	11	4	2	17	3	3	11	34	14	7	13	51	46	41.18	1958–59	2004–05	
Bristol City †	23	8	10	5	23	5	6	12	46	13	16	17	59	67	28.26	1906–07	2023–24	
Bristol Rovers	15	9	6	0	15	3	3	9	30	12	9	9	57	40	40.00	1958–59	2020–21	
Burnley	52	28	15	9	52	13	13	26	104	41	28	35	155	163	39.42	1890–91	2022–23	
Burton Albion	5	0	3	2	4	2	0	2	9	2	3	4	11	10	22.22	2017–18	2021–22	
Bury	28	20	3	5	28	10	5	13	56	30	8	18	102	74	53.57	1895–96	1998–99	
Cambridge United	5	2	2	1	5	2	1	2	10	4	3	3	20	17	40.00	1978–79	2021–22	
Cardiff City †	32	12	10	10	32	10	5	17	64	22	15	27	83	103	34.38	1921–22	2023–24	
Carlisle United	6	4	1	1	6	2	2	2	12	6	3	3	20	18	50.00	1970–71	1985–86	
Charlton Athletic	40	20	9	11	40	7	14	19	80	27	23	30	121	118	33.75	1936–37	2021–22	
Chelsea	60	29	10	21	60	9	11	40	120	38	21	61	173	218	31.67	1907–08	2016–17	
Cheltenham Town	1	1	0	0	1	0	0	1	2	1	0	1	6	2	50.00	2021–22	2021–22	
Chester City ‡	1	0	0	1	1	1	0	0	2	1	0	1	2	3	50.00	1987–88	1987–88	
Chesterfield	1	1	0	0	1	0	1	0	2	1	1	0	4	3	50.00	1987–88	1987–88	
Colchester United	1	1	0	0	1	0	0	1	2	1	0	1	4	4	50.00	2006–07	2006–07	
Coventry City †	20	8	9	3	20	2	7	11	40	10	16	14	40	47	25.00	1967–68	2023–24	
Crewe Alexandra	6	5	1	0	6	4	1	1	12	9	2	1	25	9	75.00	1997–98	2021–22	
Crystal Palace	18	7	8	3	18	5	3	10	36	12	11	13	34	39	33.33	1969–70	2016–17	
Darwen ‡	2	2	0	0	2	2	0	0	4	4	0	0	21	1	100.00	1891–92	1893–94	
Derby County	65	41	12	12	65	16	15	34	130	57	27	46	208	183	43.85	1891–92	2017–18	
Doncaster Rovers	5	3	1	1	5	4	1	0	10	7	2	1	19	6	70.00	1987–88	2021–22	
Everton	82	46	15	21	82	19	11	52	164	65	26	73	257	275	39.63	1890–91	2016–17	
Fleetwood Town	4	2	2	0	4	0	3	1	8	2	5	1	12	9	25.00	2018–19	2021–22	
Fulham	29	12	11	6	29	11	6	12	58	23	17	18	78	69	39.66	1949–50	2017–18	
Gillingham	7	4	3	0	7	5	1	1	14	9	4	1	29	13	64.29	1987–88	2021–22	
Glossop North End	1	0	1	0	1	1	0	0	2	1	1	0	2	0	50.00	1899–1900	1899–1900	(Note: Record against Glossop included)
Grimsby Town	24	15	6	3	24	12	6	6	48	27	12	9	96	60	56.25	1901–02	1998–99	
Huddersfield Town †	42	24	13	5	42	12	14	16	84	36	27	21	136	104	42.86	1920–21	2023–24	
Hull City †	22	11	4	7	22	8	7	7	44	19	11	14	57	48	43.18	1959–60	2023–24	
Ipswich Town †	28	17	3	8	28	5	6	17	56	22	9	25	70	86	39.29	1958–59	2023–24	
Leeds United †	43	22	6	15	43	9	12	22	86	31	18	37	116	123	36.05	1924–25	2023–24	
Leicester City †	43	18	14	11	43	12	7	24	86	30	21	35	110	130	34.88	1908–09	2023–24	(Note: Record against Leicester Fosse included)
Leyton Orient	14	10	3	1	14	3	5	6	28	13	8	7	45	38	46.43	1958–59	1979–80	(Note: Record against Leyton included)
Lincoln City	6	2	2	2	6	2	2	2	12	4	4	4	18	17	33.33	1958–59	2021–22	
Liverpool	80	33	15	32	80	18	22	40	160	51	37	72	222	267	31.88	1894–95	2016–17	
Luton Town	25	13	9	3	25	11	4	10	50	24	13	13	86	70	48.00	1955–56	2022–23	
Manchester City	66	35	11	20	66	12	11	43	132	47	22	63	194	233	35.61	1899–1900	2016–17	
Manchester United	64	27	15	22	64	12	14	38	128	39	29	60	183	220	30.47	1892–93	2016–17	(Note: Record against Newton Heath included)
Mansfield Town	2	2	0	0	2	2	0	0	4	4	0	0	11	2	100.00	1977–78	1987–88	
Middlesbrough †	68	38	17	13	68	19	18	31	136	57	35	44	198	176	41.91	1902–03	2023–24	
Millwall †	19	11	4	4	19	4	7	8	38	15	11	12	59	42	39.47	1970–71	2023–24	
Milton Keynes Dons	3	1	0	2	3	2	1	0	6	3	1	2	9	8	50.00	2019–20	2021–22	
Morecambe	1	1	0	0	1	1	0	0	2	2	0	0	6	0	100.00	2021–22	2021–22	
Newcastle United	71	26	25	20	71	21	19	31	142	47	44	51	208	211	33.10	1898–99	2015–16	
Northampton Town	4	2	1	1	4	1	1	2	8	3	2	3	11	11	37.50	1963–64	2020–21	
Norwich City †	26	11	7	8	26	5	6	15	52	16	13	23	61	65	30.77	1960–61	2023–24	
Nottingham Forest	44	24	12	8	44	13	10	21	88	37	22	29	134	110	42.05	1892–93	2017–18	
Notts County	37	21	10	6	37	5	12	20	74	26	22	26	121	104	35.14	1890–91	1994–95	
Oldham Athletic	20	12	4	4	20	2	10	8	40	14	14	12	60	54	35.00	1910–11	1995–96	
Oxford United	17	11	4	2	17	8	5	4	34	19	9	6	50	26	55.88	1970–71	2021–22	
Peterborough United	4	3	1	0	5	1	2	2	9	4	3	2	15	13	44.44	1992–93	2020–21	
Plymouth Argyle †	16	12	1	3	16	5	4	7	32	17	5	10	57	34	53.13	1959–60	2023–24	
Port Vale	7	3	4	0	7	3	3	1	14	6	7	1	22	15	42.86	1987–88	1998–99	
Portsmouth	53	26	17	10	53	12	16	25	106	38	33	35	178	163	35.85	1927–28	2021–22	
Preston North End †	56	33	17	6	56	14	15	27	112	47	32	33	180	159	41.96	1890–91	2023–24	
Queens Park Rangers †	19	8	7	4	19	6	3	10	38	14	10	14	49	47	36.84	1968–69	2023–24	
Reading	10	5	2	3	10	3	2	5	20	8	4	8	29	24	40.00	1986–87	2022–23	
Rochdale	3	3	0	0	3	2	1	0	6	5	1	0	15	5	83.33	2018–19	2020–21	
Rotherham United †	13	7	5	1	12	5	3	4	25	12	8	5	46	24	48.00	1958–59	2023–24	
Scunthorpe United	7	6	1	0	7	0	4	3	14	6	5	3	24	16	42.86	1958–59	2018–19	
Sheffield United	65	40	14	11	65	17	10	38	130	57	24	49	214	192	43.85	1893–94	2022–23	
Sheffield Wednesday †	59	32	11	16	59	16	16	27	118	48	27	43	187	181	40.68	1892–93	2023–24	(Note: Record against The Wednesday included)
Shrewsbury Town	7	5	2	0	8	4	2	2	15	9	4	2	21	12	60.00	1979–80	2021–22	
Southampton †	29	13	8	8	29	5	7	17	58	18	15	25	74	88	31.03	1960–61	2023–24	
Southend United	9	5	0	4	8	5	0	3	17	10	0	7	30	17	58.82	1987–88	2019–20	
Stockport County	2	2	0	0	2	1	1	0	4	3	1	0	7	2	75.00	1997–98	1998–99	
Stoke City †	71	45	17	9	71	20	16	35	142	65	33	44	204	152	45.77	1891–92	2023–24	(Note: Record against Stoke included)
Swansea City †	17	7	5	5	17	4	6	7	34	11	11	12	48	55	32.35	1958–59	2023–24	(Note: Record against Swansea Town included)
Swindon Town	13	9	3	1	13	4	3	6	26	13	6	7	44	27	50.00	1963–64	2020–21	
Tottenham Hotspur	54	22	16	16	54	13	13	28	108	35	29	44	139	150	32.41	1909–10	2016–17	
Tranmere Rovers	8	5	2	1	8	2	0	6	16	7	2	7	23	15	43.75	1991–92	2019–20	
Walsall	6	4	1	1	6	2	2	2	12	6	3	3	25	18	50.00	1961–62	2018–19	
Watford †	21	12	6	3	21	3	10	8	42	15	16	11	73	57	35.71	1970–71	2023–24	
West Bromwich Albion †	78	40	25	13	78	20	19	39	156	60	44	52	264	303	38.46	1890–91	2023–24	
West Ham United	41	20	10	11	41	9	13	19	82	29	23	30	117	125	35.37	1923–24	2016–17	
Wigan Athletic	13	6	3	4	13	5	4	4	26	11	7	8	40	29	42.31	1987–88	2022–23	
Wimbledon ‡	5	3	1	1	5	1	1	3	10	4	2	4	11	14	40.00	1985–86	2003–04	
Wolverhampton Wanderers	56	31	14	11	56	15	13	28	112	46	27	39	194	157	41.07	1890–91	2017–18	
Wrexham	2	1	1	0	2	2	0	0	4	3	1	0	5	2	75.00	1978–79	1979–80	
Wycombe Wanderers	3	2	1	0	3	0	2	1	6	2	3	1	12	7	33.33	2018–19	2021–22	
York City	3	3	0	0	3	2	0	1	6	5	0	1	13	5	83.33	1974–75	1987–88	
