= Pat Gallocher =

Scottish footballer

Personal information
- Full name: Patrick Gallocher
- Date of birth: 25 April 1865
- Place of birth: Johnstone, Scotland
- Date of death: 1 December 1916 (aged 52)
- Position: Inside forward

Senior career*
Years	Team	Apps	(Gls)
1882-1883	Johnstone Rovers		
1883–1886	Padiham		
1886–1889	Burnley	20	(6)
1889–1892	Accrington	40	(6)
- Vale of Leven
- * Club domestic league appearances and goals

Patrick Gallocher (25 April 1865 – 1 December 1916) was a Scottish professional association footballer who played as an inside forward.

== Career ==
Born in Johnstone near Paisley, his football career started in 1882 when he signed for his local club, Johnstone Rovers F.C.. By 1883 he moved to England and signed for Padiham, one of the foremost clubs in Lancashire at the time. In 1886, he moved to nearby Burnley and played almost every first-team match for the following three years.

== Season 1888–89 ==
Gallocher was part of Burnley's first ever Football League team. He was described as a very quick and tricky player with wonderful close ball control, and, his nickname was "The Artful Dodger". He made his League debut on 8 September 1888 (playing as a forward) at Deepdale, the home of Preston North End, who won 5–2; Gallocher scored the first of Burnley's two goals. He appeared in 20 of the 22 League matches played by Burnley in 1888–89 and scored six goals including a brace on one occasion.

Despite having played a full season for Burnley he signed for Accrington in March 1889 and played in their last League game of the season at inside right. The match was played on 20 April 1889 at Thorneyholme Road, Accrington and the visitors were Stoke. With the wind at their backs Accrington dominated the first half and Gallocher, on his debut for Accrington, finished off some fine passing play by scoring. Stoke were more in the game in the second half but Accrington scored early again and the match finished 2–0 to the home side, who ended the season in seventh place.

== Season 1889–90 ==
Season 1889–90 was Accrington's best season in The Football League, finishing 6th. Gallocher played in 18 of the 22 League Games. From the opening match of the season at home to Burnley (Accrington won 4–2) to the end of Accrington's FA Cup run on 1 February 1890 Gallocher played as a forward. From the visit of West Bromwich Albion onwards he moved to centre-half and played as a half-back for the rest of the season. Gallocher scored just three goals in 1889–90 including a brace on 16 November 1889 in a 6-1 home win over Derby County. Gallocher played in six of Accrington's nine wins.

Gallocher played 40 league matches for Accrington before leaving the club in 1892.

He then returned to Scotland to sign for Vale of Leven. Shortly afterwards, he retired from professional football and joined the British Army, for whom he fought with distinction in South Africa during the Boer War. Gallocher died on 1 December 1916, aged 52.

== Statistics ==
Club	Season	Division	League		FA Cup		Total	
Club	Season	Division	Apps	Goals	Apps	Goals	Apps	Goals
Burnley	1888–89	The Football League	20	6	2	3	22	9
Accrington	1888–89	Football League	1	1	-	-	1	1
Accrington	1889–90	Football League	18	3	3	0	21	3
Accrington	1890–91	Football League	21	2	3	1	24	3
