= 1888–89 Accrington F.C. season =

Accrington
1888–89 season
- Football League: 7th (20 Points)
- FA Cup: First Round
- Top goalscorer: Billy Barbour (13)
Home colours

The 1888–89 season was Accrington's first season in the Football League which had just been founded. Because of this Accrington became one of the founder members of the Football League. They finished in 7th position level on points with Everton.

== Final league table ==
Pos	Team	Pld	W	D	L	GF	GA	GAv	Pts	Qualification
5	Bolton Wanderers	22	10	2	10	63	59	1.068	22	
6	West Bromwich Albion	22	10	2	10	40	46	0.870	22	
7	Accrington	22	6	8	8	48	48	1.000	20	
8	Everton	22	9	2	11	35	47	0.745	20	
9	Burnley	22	7	3	12	42	62	0.677	17	Re-elected

Source: World Football
Rules for classification: 1) Points; 2) Goal average; 3) Goals scored

== Results ==
Accrington's score comes first

=== Legend ===
Win	Draw	Loss

=== Football League ===
Match	Date	Opponent	Venue	Result	Attendance	Scorers
1	8 September 1888	Everton	A	1–2	8,000	Holden
2	15 September 1888	Blackburn Rovers	A	5–5	4,000	Kirkham (2), Holden, Chippendale, Southworth (o.g.)
3	22 September 1888	Derby County	A	1–1	3,000	Brand
4	29 September 1888	Stoke	A	4–2	3,000	Brand (2), Barbour, Holden
5	6 October 1888	Wolverhampton Wanderers	H	4–4	3,000	Barbour (2), Brand, Holden
6	13 October 1888	Derby County	H	6–2	3,000	Brand (3), Kirkham (2), Barbour
7	20 October 1888	Preston North End	H	0–0	6,000	
8	27 October 1888	Aston Villa	A	3–4	6,000	Barbour, Brand, Kirkham
9	3 November 1888	West Bromwich Albion	A	2–2	1,000	Barbour (2)
10	10 November 1888	Notts County	A	3–3	8,000	Barbour (2), Lofhouse
11	17 November 1888	Preston North End	A	0–2	7,000	
12	24 November 1888	West Bromwich Albion	H	2–1	2,000	Kirkham, Barbour
13	1 December 1888	Burnley	H	5–1	3,000	Kirkham, Barbour (2), Brand (2)
14	8 December 1888	Wolverhampton Wanderers	A	0–4	3,000	
15	15 December 1888	Aston Villa	H	1–1	2,000	Kirkham
16	22 December 1888	Bolton Wanderers	A	1–4	5,000	Bullough (o.g.)
17	29 December 1888	Everton	H	3–1	3,000	Brand, Haworth, Lofhouse
18	12 January 1889	Burnley	A	2–2	6,000	Kirkham, A Wilkinson
19	19 January 1889	Blackburn Rovers	H	0–2	4,000	
20	26 January 1889	Notts County	H	1–2	5,000	Kirkham
21	23 March 1889	Bolton Wanderers	H	2–3	3,000	Kirkham (2)
22	20 April 1889	Stoke	H	2–0	2,000	Gallocher, Barbour

=== FA Cup ===
Round	Date	Opponent	Venue	Result	Attendance	Scorers
R1	2 February 1889	Blackburn Rovers	H	1–1	3,000	A Wilkinson
R1 Replay	9 February 1889	Blackburn Rovers	A	0–5	8,000	

== Appearances ==
Pos.	Name	League		FA Cup		Total	
Pos.	Name	Apps	Goals	Apps	Goals	Apps	Goals
FW	(Scotland) Billy Barbour	19	13	2	0	21	13
FW	(England) Jim Bonar	17	0	2	0	19	0
FW	(Scotland) Bob Brand	16	11	0	0	16	11
HB	(England) Peter Chippendale	6	1	0	0	6	1
FW	(Scotland) Hugh Galbraith	1	0	0	0	1	0
FW	(Scotland) Pat Gallocher	1	1	0	0	1	1
HB	(England) George Haworth	21	1	2	0	23	1
FW	(England) J. Holden	6	4	0	0	6	4
GK	(England) Johnny Horne	22	0	2	0	24	0
FW	(England) John Kirkham	19	12	2	0	21	12
FW	(England) Joe Lofthouse	21	2	2	0	23	2
FW	(England) Robert Macbeth	1	0	0	0	1	0
FB	(Scotland) John McLellan	19	0	1	0	20	0
HB	(England) Henry Parkinson	1	0	0	0	1	0
HB	(England) Luther Pemberton	16	0	0	0	16	0
FW	(England) J. Robertson	3	0	0	0	3	0
FB	(England) Stephen Smith-Singleton	4	0	0	0	4	0
FB	(Scotland) John Stevenson	22	0	2	0	24	0
HB	(England) James Tattersall	17	0	2	0	19	0
FW	(England) Arthur Wilkinson	4	1	2	1	6	2
HB	(England) Jonathan Wilkinson	4	0	0	0	4	0
HB	(England) J. Woods	2	0	0	0	2	0

== See also ==
- 1888–89 in English football
