= Arthur Wilkinson (footballer) =

English footballer

Personal information
- Date of birth: 1868
- Place of birth: Accrington, England
- Position: Forward

Senior career*
Years	Team	Apps	(Gls)
1888–1890	Accrington	23	(13)
- * Club domestic league appearances and goals

Arthur Wilkinson, born in 1868, was an English footballer who played in The Football League for Accrington.

== Season 1888-89 ==
Wilkinson made his League debut on 1 December 1888 at his home ground of Thorneyholme Road; he played on the right wing and Accrington won 5–1. He returned to the team to play in the return match against Burnley at Turf Moor on 12 January 1889. Wilkinson played at centre forward and scored his debut goal. Returning to his more customary right-wing position, Wilkinson played in both FA Cup ties against Blackburn Rovers. In the first, on 2 February at Thorneyholme Road, he scored Accrington's only FA Cup goal of the 1888–89 season in a 1–1 draw; they lost the replay 5–0. Accrington finished the season in seventh place.

== Season 1889-90 ==
Arthur Wilkinson' second season was the most successful as Accrington finished sixth in the Football League. Wilkinson played 17 (out of 22 League matches), 12 at Outside-Right and five at Outside-Left. He was joint top goal scorer for Accrington (with Billy Barbour), scoring 11 League Goals including two in a match twice. According to Cricket & Football Field of 14 September 1888 Arthur Wilkinson scored the first Accrington goal of the 1889–1890 Season. Accrington opened their season with a visit to Pikes Lane, to play Bolton Wanderers. It was described thus, "Accrington scored the first goal of the day 32 minutes from the start, Wilkinson being credited with the point (goal) from the right, confident appeals for hands from the Wanderers being disregarded." Accrington led 2–0 at Half-Time. Wilkinson' second goal was not described but it was probably the goal that put Accrington 4–1 ahead. Accrington won 4–2. Wilkinson' second brace (two in a match) was briefly described in the Cricket & Football Field of 16 November 1889. The match was played at Thorneyholme Road, and the visitors were Burnley . Both goals were scored in the second-half. Wilkinson' first put Accrington 4–1 up and his second made it either 5–1 or 6–1. The article is not clear. Wilkinson also played in all three FA Cup ties. Twice on the left wing and once on the right. At the end of the season he had made 21 Football League appearances in his Career, all for Accrington, and scored 12 League goals.

== Statistics ==
Club	Season	Division	League		FA Cup		Total	
Club	Season	Division	Apps	Goals	Apps	Goals	Apps	Goals
Accrington	1888–89	English Football League	4	1	2	1	6	2
Accrington	1889–90	Football League	17	11	3	2	20	13
Accrington	1890–91	Football League	2	1	3	0	5	1
