= Arthur Wilkinson (disambiguation) =

Arthur Wilkinson (1919–1968) was a British orchestra composer.

Art or Arthur Wilkinson may refer to:

- Art Wilkinson (1888–1969), Australian footballer
- Arthur Wilkinson (cricketer) (1872–?), English cricketer
- Arthur Wilkinson (footballer) (1868–?), English footballer
