= Billy Barbour =

Scottish footballer

Personal information
- Full name: William Barbour
- Date of birth: 21 September 1865
- Place of birth: Kilmarnock, Scotland
- Date of death: 17 June 1900 (aged 34)
- Place of death: Gravesend, England
- Position: Forward

Senior career*
| Years | Team | Apps | (Gls) |
| 1887 | Queen of the South Wanderers | | |
| 1888–1890 | Accrington | 53 | (33) |
| 1891–1894 | Annan | | |
| 1894–1898 | Bury | 101 | (11) |
| 1898 | Gravesend | | |
| 1898 | Millwall | | |
| 1899–1900 | Gravesend | | |
| 1900 | Grays | | |
- * Club domestic league appearances and goals

William Barbour (21 September 1865 – 17 June 1900) was a Scottish footballer who played in the English Football League for Accrington and Bury football clubs.

Barbour began his footballing career at Queen of the South Wanderers in 1887. Fans of the club were angry when he left to join Accrington in September 1888, and this led to the club being suspended by the Scottish Football Association for professionalism. Billy Barbour had received groceries in lieu of payment. Billy Barbour, playing at centre–forward, made his Accrington and League debut on 22 September 1888 at the County Ground, the then home of Derby County. The match ended as a 1–1 draw.

== Season 1888–89 ==
Barbour scored his debut League goal on 29 September 1888 at Victoria Ground, the then home of Stoke. Billy Barbour put Accrington 3–0 ahead of the home side early in the second half. Accrington defeated Stoke 4–2. Barbour appeared in 19 of the 22 League matches played by Accrington in season 1888–89 scoring 13 League goals. Barbour, playing at centre-forward (18 appearances), was part of the Accrington forward line that scored three or more League goals on seven occasions. Barbour top scored for Accrington in 1888–89 with 13 goals with eight of those goals coming in just four matches. Barbour scored two in a match on the following dates/matches: 6 October 1888 at Thorneyholme Road, home of Accrington, in a 4–4 draw with Wolverhampton Wanderers; 3 November 1888 at Stoney Lane, the then home of West Bromwich Albion. Barbour got both Accrington goals in a 2–2 draw; 10 November 1888 at Trent Bridge, the then home of Notts County. Barbour got two of Accrington' goals in a 3–3 draw; 1 December 1888 at Thorneyholme Road, with Barbour getting two Accrington goals in a 5–1 victory over Burnley.

== Season 1889–90 ==
Season 1889–1890 was Accrington's most successful League campaign in its short membership of the League. The club finished sixth. Barbour played 16 League Matches (out of 22), 6 of which were won (Accrington won nine). He was Accrington' Joint top scorer with Arthur Wilkinson scoring 11 goals plus two goals in the 1889–90 FA Cup campaign. Barbour scored in five of the nine wins Accrington achieved that season. At the end of the 1889–90 Season Barbour had scored 24 League goals over two seasons, all for Accrington, and he was Accrington' highest scorer.

Barbour continued to score regularly for Accrington making 34 League appearances and scoring 20 League goals from 1889 to 1891. He also played in four FA Cup ties and scored two goals in the same period. When he returned to Scotland in 1891 he had made 59 League and Cup appearances and scored 35 goals.

In 1891 he returned to Scotland to play for Annan.

In 1894 he joined Bury scoring 11 goals in 101 appearances over four seasons (109 appearances when you include the FA Cup).

In 1898 he joined Gravesend United, and left to join Millwall Athletic later the same year. He rejoined Gravesend in 1899.

Barbour worked as a dock labourer and played for Grays in 1900, which was his last season, as in June 1900 he died suddenly due to failure of the heart caused by chronic alcoholism.

== Statistics ==
| Club | Season | Division | League | | FA Cup | | Total | |
| Club | Season | Division | Apps | Goals | Apps | Goals | Apps | Goals |
|---|---|---|---|---|---|---|---|---|
| Accrington | 1888–89 | The Football League | 19 | 13 | 2 | 0 | 21 | 13 |
| Accrington | 1889–90 | Football League | 16 | 11 | 3 | 2 | 19 | 13 |
| Accrington | 1890–91 | Football League | 18 | 9 | 1 | 0 | 19 | 9 |
| Bury | 1894–95 | Second Division | 28* | 5 | 2 | 0 | 30 | 0 |
| Bury | 1895–96 | First Division | 25 | 3 | 1 | 3 | 26 | 6 |
| Bury | 1896–97 | First Division | 28 | 1 | 3 | 0 | 31 | 3 |
| Bury | 1897–98 | First Division | 21 | 2 | 0 | 0 | 21 | 2 |

- =Test Match Bury vs Liverpool - Bury won 1-0 to win promotion to Division 1.
