= John B. Kirkham =

English footballer

Personal information
- Full name: John Batty Kirkham
- Date of birth: 26 February 1869
- Place of birth: Clayton-le-Moors, England
- Date of death: 30 November 1930 (aged 61)
- Position: Forward

Senior career*
Years	Team	Apps	(Gls)
1883–1884	Hapton		
1884–1887	Oswaldtwistle Rovers		
1887–1888	Padiham		
1888–1893	Accrington	104	(33)
1893–1894	Blackpool		
1894	Accrington		
1894	Oswaldtwistle Rovers		
- * Club domestic league appearances and goals

John B. Kirkham (26 February 1869 – 30 November 1930) was an English footballer who played in The Football League for Accrington.

== Career ==
He signed in 1883 for his local club Hapton F.C.

In 1884 Kirkham signed for Oswaldtwistle Rovers and played for them for three seasons, 1884–87. In the 1885–86 season Oswaldtwistle Rovers reached the 2nd round of the FA Cup for the only time. It is not recorded if Kirkham played in the FA Cup games.

In 1887 Kirkham signed for Padiham. Padiham was formed in 1878 and were well supported. But being a small town the club could not compete when Football became professional.

Kirkham made his League debut on 8 September 1888 at Anfield, then home of Everton. Accrington lost the match 2–1. When he made his League debut he was 19 years 195 days old; that made him, on that first day of League football, Accrington's youngest player. Jack Kirkham played 19 League matches and scored 12 goals in season 1888–89. Kirkham top scored for Accrington. As a forward he played in a forward line that scored 3 goals or more on five occasions. He scored 2 in a match on 3 occasions that season. His debut league goal and first brace was scored on 15 September 1888 at Leamington Road, Blackburn. Accrington drew the match 5–5 with Blackburn Rovers. He spent five years at Accrington until their demise in 1893.

Season 1889-90 was Accrington' most successful ever in its short time as a member of The Football League, finishing sixth. Johnny Kirkham was an ever-present that season playing in every League match. The only other Accrington player to be ever present was John McLennan. The only match Kirkham missed was the FA Cup replay against West Bromwich Albion. Kirkham was not as effective in front of goal as in 1888–89 scoring only five League goals. He played as an inside forward and on both wings.

== Statistics ==
Appearances and goals by club, season and competition
Club	Season	League			FA Cup		Total	
Club	Season	Division	Apps	Goals	Apps	Goals	Apps	Goals
Accrington	1888–89	The Football League	19	12	2	0	21	12
Accrington	1889–90	Football League	22	5	2	0	24	5
Accrington	1890–91	Football League	11	2	3	3	14	5
Accrington	1891–92	Football League	23	5	3	1	26	6
Accrington	1892–93	First Division	30*	9	2	0	32	9

- Test Match vs Sheffield United at Town Ground, Nottingham on 22 April 1893. Accrington lost 0-1
