= George Haworth =

English footballer

Personal information
- Full name: George Haworth
- Date of birth: 17 October 1864
- Place of birth: Accrington, England
- Date of death: 5 January 1943 (aged 78)
- Place of death: Bradford, Yorkshire, England
- Positions: Right half; centre half

Youth career
- 1878–1882: Christ Church

Senior career*
Years	Team	Apps	(Gls)
1882–1883	Accrington	0	(0)
1883–1884	Preston North End	0	(0)
1884–1885	Blackburn Rovers	0	(0)
1885–1892	Accrington	74	(3)

International career
1887–1890	England	5	(0)
- * Club domestic league appearances and goals

George Haworth (17 October 1864 – 5 January 1943) was an English footballer, who helped Blackburn Rovers win the FA Cup in 1885. He also made five appearances for England.

== Playing career ==
Haworth was born in Accrington and played for Christ Church FC as a teenager from 1878 and in 1882 he was playing for Accrington. Haworth went on loan to Preston North End FC. In 1884 he was on loan to Blackburn Rovers and was a member of their team which won the FA Cup in 1885.

The 1885 FA Cup Final was played at the Oval on 4 April against Scottish team Queen's Park, who were hoping to gain revenge for their defeat, in somewhat controversial circumstances, the previous year. This time there was little controversy and it was soon clear that Rovers were the superior side, even though Queens Park fielded six players who had appeared in the England v. Scotland match two weeks earlier. After 14 minutes, Jimmy Forrest got the better of his marker Charles Campbell and was able to fire Rovers in front from close range, after Jimmy Brown's shot had come back off the goal-posts. Although Walter Arnott did put the ball in the net just before half-time, referee Francis Marindin disallowed the "goal" for handball. The Scots continued to attack, but Rovers increased their lead on 58 minutes when Brown added a second goal. From this point, Rovers controlled the game, and claimed the trophy for the second consecutive year.

For the 1885–86 season Haworth was back with Accrington, for whom he was registered for his five England appearances, making his debut against Ireland on 5 February 1887. Haworth was selected for all three matches in the 1887 British Home Championship. The matches against Ireland and Wales resulted in easy victories with scores of 7–0 (three goals from Tinsley Lindley and a pair each from Fred Dewhurst and William Cobbold) and 4–0 (another two goals from Lindley) respectively, but in England's final match of the tournament against Scotland played at Leamington Road, Blackburn on 19 March 1887 the Scots won 3–2 and went on to claim the championship.

England were able to gain revenge for the 1887 defeat by Scotland in the following year, when Haworth played at centre-half in a 5–0 victory, including two goals from Fred Dewhurst. Haworth's final international appearance came two years later in a 1–1 draw with Scotland.

== Season 1888-89 ==
In 1888, Accrington were one of the twelve founder members of The Football League, and in their first league season Haworth played in all but one of the club's 22 matches, scoring once as Accrington finished seventh in the table. George Howarth scored at Thorneyholme Road, the then home of Accrington, on 29 December 1888. He put the home team 2–1 ahead of Everton and the final score was 3–1. Haworth played wing-half in a midfield that achieved a big (three goals or more) win on one occasion. He was part of the 1st League team to debut for Accrington on 8 September 1888 at Anfield, then home of Everton. Accrington lost to Everton 2–1 but finished above Everton in the League table.

== Season 1889-90 ==
In the following season, Haworth was now team captain and "performed splendidly at the heart of the defence" as Accrington gained their highest league position with a sixth-place finish. Haworth played 16 matches (out if 22), most at wing-half with the last League appearance at centre-half. Haworth scored twice, once in a 2-2 draw at Turf Moor on 21 September 1889 and the second in a 4-2 in over Aston Villa on 30-December 1889. Haworth played at centre-half in two FA Cup appearances.

Haworth continued at centre-half for Accrington over the next three seasons, before retiring in 1892. In the first round of the FA Cup in 1892, Haworth scored in a 4–1 victory over Crusaders, before going out to Sunderland in a replayed Second Round match.

His nephew, John Haworth, was to help found Accrington Stanley and later manage Burnley.

== Honours ==
Blackburn Rovers

- FA Cup winner: 1885

== Statistics ==
Club	Season	Division	League		FA Cup		Total	
Club	Season	Division	Apps	Goals	Apps	Goals	Apps	Goals
Accrington	1888–89	The Football League	21	1	2	0	23	1
Accrington	1889–90	Football League	16	2	2	0	18	2
Accrington	1890–91	Football League	15	0	3	0	18	0
Accrington	1891–92	Football League	22	0	3	1	25	1
