= Preston North End F.C. league record by opponent =

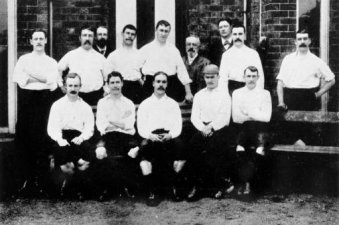
Preston North End in 1888–89, the first English football champions.

Preston North End Football Club, an English association football club based in the Deepdale area of Preston, Lancashire, was founded in 1880. For their first eight years, there was no league football, so matches were arranged on an occasional basis, supplemented by cup competitions organised at both local and national level. In 1888, Preston participated in the inaugural Football League. They won the first top-flight league title and of the 22 matches they won 18 and drew the other four, therefore they remained undefeated thus being labelled "The Invincibles". They were the only team to be known by this nickname for 115 years until Arsenal completed their 2003–04 season without a defeat. Since then the club has remained in the Football League although it has competed in its various divisions.

Preston North End's record against each club faced league competition is listed below. Preston's first league game was against Burnley in the inaugural 1888–89 Football League. They met their 109th and most recent different league opponent, Burton Albion, for the first time in the 2016–17 EFL Championship season. The team that Preston North End has met most in league competition is Burnley, against whom they have contested 128 league matches; having won 52 of these Burnley are also the side Preston have beaten the most. Preston have tied 33 games with Bolton Wanderers, they are the team that they have drawn with the most. The team that has defeated Preston the most is Aston Villa, who have won 51 of their 104 encounters with Preston.

== Key ==
- The table includes results of matches played by Preston North End in the English Football League (1888–present)
- For the sake of simplicity, present-day names are used throughout: for example, results against Newton Heath, Small Heath and Woolwich Arsenal are integrated into the records against Manchester United, Birmingham City and Arsenal, respectively
- † Teams with this background and symbol in the "Club" column are competing in the 2023–24 EFL Championship alongside Preston
- ‡ Clubs with this background and symbol in the "Club" column are defunct
- P = matches played; W = matches won; D = matches drawn; L = matches lost; F = goals for; A = goals against; Win% = percentage of total matches won
- The columns headed "First" and "Last" contain the first and most recent seasons in which Preston played league matches against each opponent

== All-time league record ==
Statistics correct as of matches played on 19 October 2024.

Preston North End F.C. league record by opponent
Club	Home				Away				Total						Win%	First	Last	Note(s)
Club	P	W	D	L	P	W	D	L	P	W	D	L	F	A	Win%	First	Last	Note(s)
Accrington ‡	5	3	2	0	5	3	2	0	10	6	4	0	20	8	60.00	1888–89	1892–93	
Aldershot ‡	6	2	1	3	6	1	3	2	12	3	4	5	12	18	25.00	1974–75	1988–89	
Arsenal	36	18	7	11	36	6	10	20	72	24	17	31	93	102	33.33	1901–02	1960–61	(Note: Record against Woolwich Arsenal included)
Aston Villa	52	26	12	14	52	9	6	37	104	35	18	51	143	181	33.65	1888–89	2018–19	
Barnet	2	1	0	1	2	0	0	2	4	1	0	3	2	4	25.00	1994–95	1995–96	
Barnsley	28	16	5	7	28	8	7	13	56	24	12	20	95	70	42.86	1901–02	2021–22	
Birmingham City	48	27	14	7	48	12	11	25	96	39	25	32	138	127	40.63	1894–95	2023–24	(Note: Record against Small Heath and Birmingham included)
Blackburn Rovers †	52	27	14	11	52	16	15	21	104	43	29	32	156	148	41.35	1888–89	2024–25	
Blackpool	45	25	7	13	45	15	11	19	90	40	18	32	146	148	44.44	1901–02	2022–23	
Bolton Wanderers	62	25	20	17	62	23	13	26	124	48	33	43	181	175	38.71	1888–89	2018–19	
AFC Bournemouth	15	6	4	5	15	5	2	8	30	11	6	13	33	35	36.67	1974–75	2021–22	
Bradford City	29	12	10	7	29	7	10	12	58	19	20	19	74	82	32.76	1903–04	2014–15	
Bradford Park Avenue	10	3	3	4	10	6	2	2	20	9	5	6	43	38	45.00	1912–13	1949–50	
Brentford	29	15	6	8	29	5	7	17	58	20	13	25	94	109	34.48	1933–34	2020–21	
Brighton & Hove Albion	14	9	5	0	14	2	6	6	28	11	11	6	32	20	39.29	1961–62	2016–17	
Bristol City †	46	22	18	6	46	9	14	23	92	31	32	29	128	123	33.70	1901–02	2024–25	
Bristol Rovers	16	3	4	9	16	6	7	3	32	9	11	12	38	46	28.13	1961–62	1999–2000	
Burnley †	64	38	12	14	64	14	15	35	128	52	27	49	218	195	40.63	1888–89	2024–25	
Burton Albion	2	1	1	0	2	2	0	0	4	3	1	0	6	3	75.00	2016–17	2017–18	
Burton United ‡	3	2	1	0	3	0	2	1	6	2	3	1	8	4	33.33	1901–02	1903–04	
Bury	48	27	13	8	48	12	14	22	96	39	27	30	124	117	40.63	1895–96	2012–13	
Cambridge United	10	5	2	3	10	1	2	7	20	6	4	10	24	28	30.00	1977–78	1999–2000	
Cardiff City †	50	25	10	15	50	12	15	23	100	37	25	38	175	131	37.00	1921–22	2024–25	
Carlisle United	16	7	3	6	16	4	6	6	32	11	9	12	39	43	34.38	1965–66	2013–14	
Charlton Athletic	34	23	6	5	34	11	7	16	68	34	13	21	125	98	50.00	1929–30	2019–20	
Chelsea	35	19	6	10	35	7	10	18	70	26	16	28	93	103	37.14	1907–08	1980–81	
Chester City ‡	13	4	5	4	13	4	3	6	26	8	8	10	39	43	30.77	1975–76	1995–96	
Chesterfield	24	11	10	3	24	7	7	10	48	18	17	13	65	47	37.50	1901–02	2014–15	(Note: Record against Chesterfield Town included)
Colchester United	16	10	2	4	16	2	6	8	32	12	8	12	41	44	37.50	1974–75	2014–15	
Coventry City †	21	13	8	0	21	7	8	6	42	20	16	6	68	51	47.62	1949–50	2024–25	
Crawley Town	3	2	0	1	3	0	1	2	6	2	1	3	7	7	33.33	2012–13	2014–15	
Crewe Alexandra	14	7	3	4	14	3	4	7	28	10	7	11	43	39	35.71	1985–86	2014–15	
Crystal Palace	20	10	7	3	20	2	4	14	40	12	11	17	38	44	30.00	1964–65	2010–11	
Darlington ‡	6	3	2	1	6	4	2	0	12	7	4	1	19	10	58.33	1925–26	1995–96	
Darwen ‡	2	2	0	0	2	1	0	1	4	3	0	1	13	3	75.00	1891–92	1893–94	
Derby County †	56	32	11	13	56	13	10	33	112	45	21	46	159	143	40.18	1888–89	2024–25	
Doncaster Rovers	16	10	3	3	16	4	6	6	32	14	9	9	57	40	43.75	1901–02	2014–15	
Everton	44	18	17	9	44	12	8	24	88	30	25	33	120	120	34.09	1888–89	1960–61	
Exeter City	12	6	4	2	12	4	1	7	24	10	5	9	29	39	41.67	1977–78	2011–12	
Fleetwood Town	1	1	0	0	1	0	1	0	2	1	1	0	4	3	50.00	2014–15	2014–15	
Fulham	34	15	7	12	34	9	6	19	68	24	13	31	80	96	35.29	1912–13	2021–22	
Gainsborough Trinity	3	2	1	0	3	1	0	2	6	3	1	2	7	4	50.00	1901–02	1903–04	
Gillingham	25	9	13	3	25	7	7	11	50	16	20	14	57	58	32.00	1970–71	2014–15	
Glossop	6	4	2	0	6	3	1	2	12	7	3	2	18	10	58.33	1899–1900	1914–15	
Grimsby Town	29	20	4	5	29	7	12	10	58	27	16	15	105	80	46.55	1903–04	2002–03	
Halifax Town ‡	5	3	1	1	5	1	0	4	10	4	1	5	12	14	40.00	1970–71	1986–87	
Hartlepool United	8	5	1	2	8	3	2	3	16	8	3	5	22	15	50.00	1985–86	2012–13	
Hereford United ‡	8	4	3	1	8	4	3	1	16	8	6	2	31	21	50.00	1974–75	1995–96	
Huddersfield Town	45	23	12	10	45	10	11	24	90	33	23	34	121	120	36.67	1912–13	2023–24	
Hull City †	31	22	3	6	31	6	11	14	62	28	14	20	92	90	45.16	1912–13	2024–25	
Ipswich Town	17	8	6	3	17	4	4	9	34	12	10	12	46	42	35.29	1964–65	2023–24	
Leeds City ‡	2	2	0	0	2	0	1	1	4	2	1	1	6	7	50.00	1912–13	1914–15	
Leeds United †	27	14	6	7	27	9	6	12	54	23	12	19	91	78	42.59	1924–25	2024–25	
Leicester City	26	14	8	4	26	11	7	8	52	25	15	12	80	54	48.08	1901–02	2023–24	(Note: Record against Leicester Fosse included)
Leyton Orient	30	11	11	8	30	7	10	13	60	18	21	21	79	81	30.00	1912–13	2014–15	(Note: Record against Leyton included)
Lincoln City	18	11	3	4	18	5	6	7	36	16	9	11	62	37	44.44	1901–02	1998–99	
Liverpool	32	15	9	8	32	6	8	18	64	21	17	26	99	114	32.81	1895–96	1961–62	
Luton Town †	25	17	5	3	25	8	6	11	50	25	11	14	73	63	50.00	1949–50	2024–25	
Macclesfield Town	1	0	1	0	1	0	0	1	2	0	1	1	4	5	0.00	1998–99	1998–99	
Manchester City	41	16	7	18	41	13	8	20	82	29	15	38	131	147	35.37	1899–1900	2001–02	
Manchester United	33	13	9	11	33	7	11	15	66	20	20	26	90	107	30.30	1892–93	1960–61	(Note: Record against Newton Heath included)
Mansfield Town	12	8	0	4	12	5	5	2	24	13	5	6	43	30	54.17	1970–71	1995–96	
Middlesbrough †	49	22	12	15	49	9	13	27	98	31	25	42	129	149	31.63	1901–02	2024–25	
Millwall †	35	18	7	10	35	7	6	22	70	25	13	32	86	103	35.71	1928–29	2024–25	
Milton Keynes Dons	5	0	5	0	5	3	2	0	10	3	7	0	10	6	30.00	2011–12	2015–16	
Newcastle United	38	20	5	13	38	9	7	22	76	29	12	35	118	125	38.16	1898–99	2016–17	
Newport County	4	2	2	0	4	0	3	1	8	2	5	1	10	10	25.00	1981–82	1984–85	
Northampton Town	14	8	5	1	14	6	2	6	28	14	7	7	41	33	50.00	1963–64	1998–99	
Norwich City †	24	11	7	6	24	6	9	9	48	17	16	15	62	60	35.42	1961–62	2024–25	
Nottingham Forest	50	14	18	18	50	27	11	12	100	41	29	30	147	137	41.00	1892–93	2021–22	
Notts County	42	27	9	6	42	14	12	16	84	41	21	22	143	89	48.81	1888–89	2014–15	
Oldham Athletic	26	13	7	6	26	7	4	15	52	20	11	21	74	70	38.46	1910–11	2014–15	
Oxford United †	11	5	2	4	11	2	2	7	22	7	4	11	28	32	31.82	1968–69	2024–25	
Peterborough United	12	6	3	3	12	3	3	6	24	9	6	9	28	26	37.50	1974–75	2021–22	
Plymouth Argyle †	29	15	10	4	29	8	7	14	58	23	17	18	74	67	39.66	1930–31	2024–25	
Port Vale	23	16	2	5	23	5	9	9	46	21	11	14	78	54	45.65	1901–02	2014–15	(Note: Record against Burslem Port Vale included)
Portsmouth †	38	19	15	4	38	13	10	15	76	32	25	19	124	100	42.11	1925–26	2024–25	
Queens Park Rangers †	24	10	10	4	24	8	7	9	48	18	17	13	61	56	37.50	1949–50	2024–25	
Reading	32	19	6	7	32	6	6	20	64	25	12	27	99	96	39.06	1926–27	2022–23	
Rochdale	8	4	1	3	8	4	2	2	16	8	3	5	24	18	50.00	1970–71	2014–15	
Rotherham United	28	10	13	5	28	5	8	15	56	15	21	20	70	77	26.79	1961–62	2023–24	
Scarborough ‡	3	2	1	0	3	2	1	0	6	4	2	0	13	9	66.67	1993–94	1995–96	
Scunthorpe United	16	9	3	4	16	6	2	8	32	15	5	12	54	43	46.88	1961–62	2014–15	
Sheffield United †	55	25	17	13	55	8	11	36	110	33	28	49	144	164	30.00	1893–94	2024–25	
Sheffield Wednesday †	52	29	14	9	52	12	8	32	104	41	22	41	148	138	39.42	1892–93	2024–25	(Note: Record against The Wednesday included)
Shrewsbury Town	13	8	3	2	13	6	1	6	26	14	4	8	41	29	53.85	1970–71	2013–14	
South Shields ‡	3	2	1	0	3	1	2	0	6	3	3	0	16	10	50.00	1925–26	1927–28	
Southampton	20	10	6	4	20	4	7	9	40	14	13	13	59	58	35.00	1925–26	2023–24	
Southend United	12	8	2	2	12	4	4	4	24	12	6	6	45	34	50.00	1974–75	2006–07	
Stevenage	3	2	1	0	3	1	2	0	6	3	3	0	11	3	50.00	2011–12	2013–14	
Stockport County	13	8	3	2	13	5	3	5	26	13	6	7	54	29	50.00	1901–02	2001–02	
Stoke City †	52	31	10	11	52	15	13	24	104	46	23	35	176	141	44.23	1888–89	2024–25	(Note: Record against Stoke included)
Sunderland †	55	26	15	14	55	6	17	32	110	32	32	46	157	177	29.09	1891–92	2024–25	
Swansea City †	33	17	12	4	33	5	6	22	66	22	18	26	93	111	33.33	1925–26	2024–25	(Note: Record against Swansea Town included)
Swindon Town	15	9	5	1	15	4	3	8	30	13	8	9	46	38	43.33	1963–64	2014–15	
Torquay United	7	4	2	1	7	2	0	5	14	6	2	6	24	15	42.86	1970–71	1995–96	
Tottenham Hotspur	26	12	6	8	26	5	7	14	52	17	13	22	79	96	32.69	1909–10	1960–61	
Tranmere Rovers	12	7	4	1	12	2	5	5	24	9	9	6	31	31	37.50	1970–71	2013–14	
Walsall	25	16	3	6	25	5	4	16	50	21	7	22	62	58	42.00	1961–62	2014–15	
Watford †	19	10	7	2	19	4	6	9	38	14	13	11	47	42	36.84	1969–70	2024–25	
West Bromwich Albion †	53	25	14	14	53	14	11	28	106	39	25	42	156	152	36.79	1888–89	2024–25	
West Ham United	14	8	4	2	14	3	2	9	28	11	6	11	39	46	39.29	1923–24	2004–05	
Wigan Athletic	21	10	6	5	21	7	7	7	42	17	13	12	61	56	40.48	1982–83	2022–23	
Wimbledon ‡	6	2	2	2	6	0	2	4	12	2	4	6	19	27	16.67	1981–82	2003–04	
Wolverhampton Wanderers	58	28	16	14	58	15	11	32	116	43	27	46	188	197	37.07	1888–89	2017–18	
Wrexham	15	10	2	3	15	3	7	5	30	13	9	8	37	28	43.33	1970–71	1999–2000	
Wycombe Wanderers	7	4	2	1	7	3	3	1	14	7	5	2	23	18	50.00	1993–94	2020–21	
Yeovil Town	3	2	1	0	3	1	0	2	6	3	1	2	12	11	50.00	2011–12	2014–15	
York City	6	5	0	1	6	3	1	2	12	8	1	3	22	13	66.67	1976–77	1998–99	
