= John Horne (footballer) =

English footballer

Personal information
- Full name: John Kay Horne
- Date of birth: 17 January 1862
- Place of birth: Huncoat, England
- Date of death: 30 October 1926 (aged 63–64)
- Place of death: Hesketh Bank, England
- Height: 5 ft 10 in (1.78 m)
- Position: Goalkeeper

Senior career*
Years	Team	Apps	(Gls)
1883	Accrington	0	(0)
1883–1884	Windsor	0	(0)
1884–1885	Grimsby Town	0	(0)
1885–1886	Bury	0	(0)
1886	Accrington	0	(0)
1886	Burslem Port Vale	0	(0)
1886–1887	Accrington	0	(0)
1887	Burslem Port Vale	0	(0)
1887–1889	Accrington	22	(0)
1890	Blackburn Rovers	2	(0)
1891	Notts County	0	(0)
1891	Accrington	1	(0)
1891–1892	Burton Swifts		
1892–1893	Accrington	3	(0)
1893–1894	Darwen	1	(0)
- * Club domestic league appearances and goals

John Kay Horne (17 January 1862 – 30 October 1926), or Johnny Horne, was an English footballer who played as a goalkeeper for Accrington (in six spells), Windsor, Grimsby Town, Bury, Burslem Port Vale, Blackburn Rovers, Notts County, Burton Swifts, and Darwen. He kept goal for Blackburn as they won the 1890 FA Cup final.

== Career ==
Horne played for Accrington (in two spells). He put his business interests ahead of football and left Accrington for Windsor, Grimsby Town, and Bury before he joined Burslem Port Vale in May 1886. He made his debut for the club in the final of the North Staffordshire Charity Challenge Cup on 22 May, which ended in a 1–0 defeat to nearby Stoke. He rejoined Accrington in October, before returning to Port Vale in 1887. He returned to Accrington for a fourth spell in October 1887. On 8 September 1888, he made his league debut at Anfield, then home of Everton; Accrington lost the match 2–1. He played all 22 league games in the 1888–89 season; the only other Accrington player to do so was John Stevenson. Horne played in a defensive-line that kept two clean-sheets and restricted the opposition to one goal on five occasions. He was described as a fine amateur goalkeeper, though he only managed to keep two clean sheets. On 20 October 1888, Horne was part of a defence that prevented Preston North End's "The Invincibles" from scoring. Preston North End played 27 League and FA Cup matches in the 1988–89 season, and their visit to Accrington was the only time they failed to score a goal. A chemist by trade, by the time he joined Blackburn Rovers he had a reputation as one of the safest goalkeepers in the country. He featured in just five competitive matches during the 1989–90 season, though one of these games was the 1890 FA Cup final, a comprehensive 6–1 victory over The Wednesday at Kennington Oval. He later played for Notts County, Accrington (in another two spells), Burton Swifts, and Darwen.

== Career statistics ==
Appearances and goals by club, season and competition
Club	Season	League			FA Cup		Total	
Club	Season	Division	Apps	Goals	Apps	Goals	Apps	Goals
Accrington	1888–89	the Football League	22	0	2	0	24	0
Blackburn Rovers	1889–90	Football League	2	0	3	0	5	0
Accrington	1890–91	Football League	1	0	-	-	1	0
Accrington	1892–93	First Division	3	0	-	-	3	0
Darwen	1893–94	First Division	1	0	1	0	2	0

== Honours ==
Burslem Port Vale

- North Staffordshire Charity Challenge Cup runner-up: 1886

Blackburn Rovers

- FA Cup: 1890
