= Luther Pemberton =

English footballer

Personal information
- Full name: Luther Pemberton
- Date of birth: 21 February 1866
- Place of birth: Oswaldtwistle
- Date of death: 1944 (aged 77–78)
- Position: Defender

Senior career*
Years	Team	Apps	(Gls)
1885–1888	Bell's Temperance		
1888–1891	Accrington	45	(0)
- * Club domestic league appearances and goals

Luther Pemberton (21 February 1866 – 1944) was an English footballer from Oswaldtwistle, a small town close to Blackburn and Accrington. In 1885 he joined Bell's Temperance F.C., an Accrington-based football club who played in the 1880s and 1890s competing in the FA Cup.

== Season 1888–89 ==
Pemberton made his league debut on 8 September 1888, playing at wing-half, at Anfield, then home of Everton on 8 September 1888. Accrington lost the match 2–1. Pemberton played 16 of Accrington's 22 league games in season 1888–89. Pemberton played wing-half in a midfield that achieved big (three-League-goals-or-more) wins on two occasions. Pemberton helped Accrington to finish seventh in the league, on goal average above Everton.

== Season 1889–90 ==
Season 1889–90 was Accrington's most successful season in their short time as members of Football League. Pemberton played 20 league matches, including all nine league wins. He played most of the season at centre-half with four league matches played at wing-half. Pemberton played all three of Accrington's FA Cup ties and he played at wing-half.

== Statistics ==
Club	Season	Division	League		FA Cup		Total	
Club	Season	Division	Apps	Goals	Apps	Goals	Apps	Goals
Accrington	1888–89	The Football League	16	0	-	-	16	0
Accrington	1889–90	Football League	20	0	3	0	23	0
Accrington	1890–91	Football League	9	0	-	-	9	0
