= Robert Macbeth =

English footballer (1862–1931)

Personal information
- Full name: Robert Macbeth
- Date of birth: Q2 1862
- Place of birth: Reading, England
- Date of death: Q2 1931 (aged 69)
- Position: Forward

Senior career*
Years	Team	Apps	(Gls)
1882-1883	St.Bernard's		
1883–1887	Accrington		
1887-1888	Grimsby Town		
1888–1889	Accrington	2	(0)
1889	Grimsby Town		
1890	Accrington	3	(0)
1891	Grimsby Town		
1892	Burton Swifts		
1892	Northwich Victoria	13	(3)
1893	Rotherham Town	2	(0)
- * Club domestic league appearances and goals

Robert Macbeth (1862–1931) was an English footballer. He started his career in Scotland signing for St.Bernard's in 1882, an Edinburgh club, and played there for one season.

Macbeth moved to England in 1883 and signed for Accrington playing friendlies and FA Cup ties.

In the final season before the Football League started Macbeth signed for Grimsby Town. He left sometime in 1888. (Date not recorded)

Macbeth played in The Football League for Accrington, Northwich Victoria and Rotherham Town. Robert Macbeth made his debut and played his only game of the inaugural Football League season of 1888–1889 on 19 January 1889. He played on the left wing and played at Thorneyholme Road, Accrington. Accrington lost 0–2 to Blackburn Rovers.

== Statistics ==
Appearances and goals by club, season and competition
Club	Season	League			FA Cup		Total	
Club	Season	Division	Apps	Goals	Apps	Goals	Apps	Goals
Accrington	1888–89	The Football League	1	0	-	-	1	0
Accrington	1890–91	Football League	3	0	-	-	3	0
Northwich Victoria	1892–93	Second Division	13	3	3	2	16	5
Rotherham United	1893–94	Second Division	2	0	1		3	0
