= Queen of the South Wanderers F.C. =

Former association football club in Scotland

Queen of the South Wanderers
- Full name: Queen of the South Wanderers Football Club
- Nickname: Wanderers
- Founded: 1876
- Dissolved: 1889
- Ground: Nunholm
Home colours	Change colours

Queen of the South Wanderers F.C. was an association football club from Dumfries, Dumfriesshire, Scotland.

== History ==
The club was founded in 1876 and named after a description of the town of Dumfries by the poet David Dunbar. It was the second club founded in the town, after the original Dumfries club in 1869. The media occasionally referred to the club under the name of Dumfries Wanderers.

The club first entered the Scottish Cup in 1876–77, losing to Girvan in the second round after a bye in the first. The club's first round match with the 5th KRV in 1883–84 made history by being the highest recorded scoring draw in British first-class history, finishing 7–7.

The club had a substantial Cup run in 1886–87, reaching the fifth round, but it came at a cost; the Scottish Football Association investigated the club for professionalism, and suspended the club for 2 months. The investigation had repercussions which ultimately killed the club off. For the start of the next season, the club moved to a new ground, Cresswell Park, with the first visitors being the Scottish Cup holders Hibernian; remarkably, the Wanderers won 8–2.

The club's high point was in the 1888–89 season. The club gained friendly victories against Rangers (6–2) and Bolton Wanderers (5–3). It also went on its joint-best Scottish Cup run, with some eye-opening scores; 9–4 against the 5th KRV, 14–2 against Newton Stewart Athletic, 11–1 against Vale o' Nith, and 10–2 against Falkirk, which remains the Bairns' joint record Cup defeat. The run came to an end with a 3–1 defeat at St Mirren.

=== Professionalism scandal ===
In July 1889, the club president, George Henry Cole, brought an action against Alexander Haining, the club's former treasurer, in the Dumfries Sheriff Court, asking for a full set of accounts or £50 compensation for money that seemed to be missing. Haining defended the action by stating that there was no such loss; after the SFA investigated in 1887, at the club committee's suggestion, he burned the account books which recorded payments to players, and presented clean cashbooks to the auditors. To ensure players were paid and the books were acceptable to the SFA, Haining kept some club subscriptions off the accounts, and used that money to pay the players, rather than using the accounts for audit. The secret payments made included paying two players (Calderhead and Provand) £1 per month as wages, plus their travel expenses, Provand's expenses in moving from Glasgow, and £10 to Calderhead to set up as a coal agent; two unemployed players (Halliday and Barbour) were given free food; another (Bob Brand) a free suit of clothes. Another player (Barbour) was offered money to stay with the club, but he moved to Accrington F.C., as professionalism was legal in England and he could earn more there.

Cole denied knowing anything about the payments, as he thought the club was amateur, and the evidence suggested that news of the payments had been deliberately kept from him. Haining claimed many of the 22 members of the committee knew about the payment, and his lawyer submitted that one director, if he genuinely did not know about the payments, was "a more complete example of stupidity and ignorance than they would expect in a man occupying his position"; the club claimed it was only ever meant to be an amateur club and Haining had no authority effectively to turn it into a professional club in secret.

Sheriff Hope found in favour of Haining, stating that the evidence was "very sad as indication of the widespread deficiency in truth and honour among the class to which the football players and their friends in the town belong".

It was a Pyrrhic victory. Haining had to set up a request for money to have his legal expenses paid. From the club's perspective, the case was fatal. After the Wanderers beat Moffat F.C. 3–1 in the first round of the Churchill Cup on 16 November 1889, Moffat raised a protest that the club was employing professionals; after three secret sittings inside a week, the Scottish FA expelled the club for professionalism, along with the entire committee and two players. Many of the club's players left for England, where professionalism was legal.

A new club was promptly set up under the name Leafield Swifts F.C., which, after playing for a season as Dumfries Wanderers, changed its name to Queen of the South Wanderers.

The club has no connection to the modern football team called Queen of the South.

== Colours ==
For most of the club's existence, its colours were 2" blue and white hooped jerseys (described as navy blue in 1878–79 and royal blue thereafter) and blue and white stockings with white kmickers. From 1888 the club wore 1" black and white hooped shirts and blue knickers.

For two matches at the end of the 1886–87 season, against Vale o' Nith and Moffat, the club wore white shirts, as a change kit to avoid a clash with the Vale's black and white, and Moffat's navy and white.

== Ground ==
The club played at a number of grounds, including:

- 1879–86: Nunholm
- 1886–87: Caledonian Park
- 1887–89: Cresswell Park

The club built a pavilion at Cresswell Park, with a partition so that a concert room could be converted into two dressing rooms.

== Honours ==
Churchill Cup

- Winners: 1884–85, 1885–86

Southern Counties Charity Cup

- Winners: 1884–85, 1885–86, 1886–87 1888–89,

== Notable players ==
- David Calderhead, a stalwart of the club between 1881 and 1889, was capped for Scotland against Ireland in 1889. The match resulted in a resounding 7–0 win.
- Bob Brand, who later played for Heart of Midlothian F.C. and Rangers F.C. before playing in the Football League
- Johnny Irving, who joined Lincoln City F.C. when the club was expelled
- Billy Barbour, Football League player for Accrington F.C.
