= 1892 in association football =

The following are the association football events of the year 1892 throughout the world.

== Events ==
=== Chile ===
- Club de Deportes Santiago Wanderers

=== Czech Republic ===
- Slavia Prague

=== England ===
- Bromley F.C.
- Droylsden F.C.
- Liverpool F.C.
- Newcastle United F.C.
- Old Castle Swifts F.C.

=== Netherlands ===
- Vitesse Arnhem

=== Germany ===
- Hertha BSC

== National League Champions ==
=== Europe ===
Nation	Tournament	Winner	Runner-up	Title	Previous Title won
Denmark	Football Tournament	None (three way tie)	None	None	None
England	Football League	Sunderland	Preston North End	1st	None
Ireland	Irish League	Linfield	Lancashire Fusiliers	2nd	1891
Netherlands	Football League Championship	AVV RAP	RC en VV Rotterdam	1st	None
Scotland	Football League	Dumbarton	Celtic	2nd	1891

== Domestic Cups ==
=== Asia ===
Nation	Tournament	Winner	Score	Runner-up	Venue	Title	Previous title won
India	Durand Cup	King's Own Scottish Borderers	3-0	Argyll and Sutherland Highlanders	Annadale	2nd	1891

=== Europe ===
Nation	Tournament	Winner	Score	Runner-up	Venue	Title	Previous title won
England	FA Cup	West Bromwich Albion	3-0	Aston Villa	Kennington Oval	2nd	1888
Ireland	Irish Cup	Linfield	7-0	Black Watch	Solitude	2nd	1891
Scotland	Scottish Cup	Celtic	5-1 (replay following voided 1-0 Celtic win)	Queen's Park	Ibrox Park	1st	None
Wales	Welsh Cup	Chirk	2-1	Westminister Rovers	Racecourse Ground	4th	1890

== International tournaments ==
- 1892 British Home Championship (February 27 – April 7, 1892)

England

== Births ==
- January 16: Robert Coverdale, English professional footballer (d. 1959)
- April 4: Chris Elvidge, English professional footballer (d. date unknown)
- April 29: Henri Bard, French footballer (d. 1951)
- May 20: Josiah Kelsall, English professional footballer (d. 1974)
