= Stephen Singleton (footballer) =

English footballer

Personal information
- Full name: Stephen Smith Singleton
- Date of birth: Q4 1866
- Place of birth: Earby
- Date of death: 1915 (aged 48–49)
- Position: Defender

Senior career*
Years	Team	Apps	(Gls)
1888–1889	Accrington	4	(0)
1894–1895	Sheffield United	0	(0)
- * Club domestic league appearances and goals

Stephen Singleton (1866–1915) was an English footballer who played in The Football League for Accrington. Stephen Singleton was a professional player who was released by Accrington at the end of the 1888–1889 season. He played in the inaugural Football League season of 1888-1889 and only played 4 League matches and both FA Cup matches. His debut was on the 27 October 1888, at Wellington Road, Birmingham, then home of Aston Villa. Accrington lost the match 3–4. Accrington finished the season in 7th place, 5 places below Aston Villa who finished Championship Runners-up.

== Statistics ==
Club	Season	Division	League		FA Cup		Total	
Club	Season	Division	Apps	Goals	Apps	Goals	Apps	Goals
Accrington	1888–89	The Football League	4	0	2	0	6	0
Sheffield	1894–95	Football League Div. 1	0	0	0	0	0	0
