= J. Woods (footballer) =

Footballer

Personal information
- Position: Full back

Senior career*
Years	Team	Apps	(Gls)
1888–1889	Accrington	2	(0)
- * Club domestic league appearances and goals

J. Woods was a footballer who played in The Football League for Accrington. He played twice in the inaugural 1888–89 Football League season. His debut was on 10 November 1888, at Trent Bridge, Nottingham, then home of Notts County. Accrington were held in a 3–3 draw. They finished the season in seventh place, four places above Notts County who had to seek re-election to the 1889–90 Football League.
