= 1891 in association football =

The following are the association football events of the year 1891 throughout the world.

== Events ==
- Royal Arsenal turn professional, renaming themselves Woolwich Arsenal in the process.

=== Denmark ===
- Vejle Boldklub

=== England ===
- Harpenden Town F.C.
- Redditch United F.C.

=== Greece ===
- Panachaiki

=== Northern Ireland ===
- Belfast Celtic F.C.

=== Scotland ===
- Vale of Leithen F.C.

=== Sweden ===
- Allmänna Idrottsklubben
- Djurgårdens IF

=== Uruguay ===
- C.A. Peñarol (as Central Uruguay Railway Cricket Club)

== National Championship Winners ==
=== South America ===
| Nation | Tournament | Winner | Runner-up | Title |
|---|---|---|---|---|
| Argentina | Primera Division | St. Andrew's | Old Caledonians | 1st |

=== Europe ===
| Nation | Tournament | Winner | Runner-up | Title |
|---|---|---|---|---|
| Denmark | Football Tournament | Kjøbenhavns Boldklub | Akademisk Boldklub | 1st |
| England | Football League | Everton | Preston North End | 1st |
| Ireland | Irish League | Linfield | Ulster | 1st |
| Netherlands | Football League Championship | HVV Den Haag | Koninkiljke | 1st |
| Scotland | Football League | Dumbarton & Rangers (joint champions) | None | 1st |

== Domestic Cups ==
=== Asia ===
| Nation | Tournament | Winner | Score | Runner-up | Venue | Title |
|---|---|---|---|---|---|---|
| India | Durand Cup | King's Own Scottish Borderers | 2-1 | East Lancashire Regiment | Annadale | 1st |

=== Europe ===
| Nation | Tournament | Winner | Score | Runner-up | Venue | Title | Previous title won |
|---|---|---|---|---|---|---|---|
| England | FA Cup | Blackburn Rovers | 3-1 | Notts County | Kennington Oval | 5th | 1890 |
| Ireland | Irish Cup | Linfield | 4-2 | Ulster | Solitude | 1st | None |
| Scotland | Scottish Cup | Heart of Midlothian | 1-0 | Dumbarton | Cathkin Park | 1st | None |
| Wales | Welsh Cup | Shrewsbury Town | 5-2 | Wrexham | Cricket Field | 1st | None |

== International tournaments ==
- 1891 British Home Championship (28 March – 6 April 1891)

Champion
England

== Births ==
- 5 January – James Boe (d. 1973), English professional footballer
- 22 September – Charlie Buchan (d. 1960), England international forward in six matches (1913–1924), scoring four goals.
- 15 December – David Wijnveldt (d. 1962), Netherlands international (1912).
