= J. Holden =

English footballer

Personal information
- Position: Forward

Senior career*
Years	Team	Apps	(Gls)
1888–1891	Accrington	7	(4)
- * Club domestic league appearances and goals

J. Holden was an English footballer who played in The Football League for Accrington.

J Holden made his League and club debut, as a forward, on 8 September 1888 at Anfield, then home of Everton. Although Accrington lost the match 2–1, Holden scored Accrington's first ever League goal. J Holden played six of the 22 League matches Accrington played in season 1888–89 and scored four League goals. Holden played as a forward in a forward-line that scored three or more goals in a League match on three occasions.
