= Come Back Peter (1952 film) =

1952 British film by Charles Saunders

- Directed by: Charles Saunders
- Written by: Charles Saunders
- Based on: Play Come Back Peter by A. P. Dearsley
- Produced by: Charles Reynolds
- Starring: Patrick Holt; Peter Hammond; Humphrey Lestocq
- Cinematography: Ted Lloyd
- Edited by: Margery Saunders
- Music by: Arthur Wilkinson
- Production company: Charles Reynolds Productions
- Distributed by: Apex Film Distributors
- Release date: November 1952
- Running time: 80 minutes
- Country: United Kingdom
- Language: English

Come Back Peter is a 1952 second feature British comedy film directed by Charles Saunders and starring Patrick Holt, Peter Hammond and Humphrey Lestocq. It was written by Saunders based on the play Come Back Peter by A. P. Dearsley. It was an independent picture by Charles Reynolds Productions.

== Cast ==
- Patrick Holt as John Neilson
- Peter Hammond as George Harris
- Humphrey Lestocq as Arthur Hapgood
- Kathleen Boutall]as Mrs. Hapgood
- Charles Lamb as Mr. Hapgood
- Pamela Bygrave as Myrna Hapgood
- Aud Johansen as Virginia
- Dorothy Primrose as Phyllis Hapgood
- Doris Groves as Dandy
- John Singer as Ted
- Joan Hickson as Mrs. Harris
- Ronnie Stevens as salesman
- Ian Fleming as bank manager

== Critical reception ==
The Monthly Film Bulletin wrote: "A busy domestic comedy, angled to the housing shortage problem; it is high-spirited and obvious, and has plenty of clean and reasonably good fun."

Picturegoer wrote: "Exuberant domestic romp for the not-too-sophisticated."

Picture Show wrote: "This rollicking farcical comedy is bound to appeal to those who have suffered from housing shortage. ...The chaos which results from this mix-up of assorted characters provides plenty of nonsensical amusement, all well played."

In British Sound Films: The Studio Years 1928–1959 David Quinlan rated the film as "average", writing: "Light fun with lots of incident."

TV Guide wrote: "Unmemorable comedy."

Allmovie wrote "Some laughs, some tears, some pretzels, some beers. Come Back Peter went down easily in a brisk 80 minutes."
