= Dumfries F.C. =

Former association football club in Scotland

Dumfries Football Club
- Full name: Dumfries
- Nickname(s): the Cresswellites
- Founded: 1897
- Dissolved: 1919
- Ground: Eastfield Park
Home colours

Dumfries Football Club was an association football club from Dumfries, Scotland.

== History ==
The name was used by at least four clubs, the first founded in 1869 and playing exclusively rugby union from 1877, the second existing from 1885 to 1891.

The longest-lasting Dumfries club was founded in 1897. It was an entrant to the Scottish Cup from 1897–98 to 1914–15, usually not making it through the qualifying rounds.

The first time the club reached the first round proper was in 1904–05, when it was drawn at home to Celtic, before a club record crowd of 3,000. The club came close to achieving a remarkable shock, taking the lead in its first attack after half-time, but the Bhoys equalized within five minutes, and Alec Bennett scored the winner for the visitors with seven minutes to go.

The club reached the first round on three more occasions, losing every time; the best performance came against Port Glasgow Athletic in 1906–07, holding the Scottish League first division side to a draw in the initial game, in front of 2,000 spectators.

Dumfries was a strong club at a local level. It won the Southern Counties Cup every season from 1897–98 to 1902–03, and eight times in total; and the Southern Counties Charity Cup six times from 1898 to 1910.

== Merger into Queen of the South ==
The Dumfries & Galloway area was not strong enough to support a large number of local clubs. There had been sporadic attempts to form a South of Scotland league, but these had almost all petered out, with resignations and unfinished seasons; the 1897–98 attempt for instance saw one resignation before the season started, and another after one match, finishing with Dumfries in second place but with nearly half of its fixtures still to play.

At the outbreak of the First World War, the Dumfries club was in financial difficulties. The final season had seen the club make a loss of £4 3/8, which left the club with debts of over £50. Even at this stage, one of the club's directors suggested amalgamating with one of the other clubs in the town, the 5th King's Own Scottish Borderers F.C., in order to raise crowd levels. As a short-term measure the club looked to sell some of the land alongside the Eastfield Park ground.

The merger suggestion came back to life after the war concluded. On 21 March 1919, a public meeting was held in Dumfries Town Hall, with a view to forming a single club to represent the town, perhaps with a view to applying to join the Scottish League. At the meeting, representatives of three clubs in the town - Dumfries, the 5th KOSB, and the works side of the Arrol-Johnston car factory - agreed to merge into a new club, eventually named Queen of the South F.C., and the new club's first meeting took place a week later.

== Colours ==
The club originally played in black and white shirts; in hoops from 1897 to 1900 and stripes until 1903. The club then played in maroon shirts for the remainder of its existence, with amber facings from 1912 to 1915.

== Ground ==
The club played at a number of grounds in the town:

- 1897: Dumfries Cycle Track
- 1897–98: Palmerston Park
- 1898–1903: Cresswell Park
- 1903–1919: Eastfield Park
