= J. Robertson (footballer) =

Scottish footballer

Personal information
- Full name: J. Robertson
- Position: Inside forward

Senior career*
Years	Team	Apps	(Gls)
1887–1888	Morton		
1888–1889	Accrington	3	(0)
- * Club domestic league appearances and goals

J. Robertson was a Scottish footballer who played in The Football League for Accrington. Robertson club and League debut were at inside forward for the visit of Burnley on 1 December 1888. Accrington won 5–1 and Robertson played the next 2 games. Robertson was left out for the trip to Pikes Lane, the then home of Bolton Wanderers. What happened to him after that is not recorded.
