= Josiah Kelsall =

English footballer

Personal information
- Full name: Josiah Kelsall
- Date of birth: 20 May 1892
- Place of birth: Maryport, England
- Date of death: 24 April 1974 (aged 81)
- Place of death: Beeston, Nottinghamshire, England
- Position: Forward

Senior career*
Years	Team	Apps	(Gls)
1912–1913	Maryport		
1913–1914	Sunderland	1	(0)
1919	Houghton Rovers		
1919–1920	Spennymoor United		
- * Club domestic league appearances and goals

Josiah Kelsall (20 May 1892 – 24 April 1974) was an English professional footballer who played as a forward for Sunderland.
