= Dumfries F.C. (1869) =

Former association football club in Scotland

Dumfries Football Club
- Full name: Dumfries
- Founded: 1869
- Dissolved: 1877
- Ground: Dock Park
- Secretary: William Kennedy
Home colours

Dumfries Football Club was an association football club from Dumfries, Scotland.

== History ==
The club was one of the first clubs founded in Scotland; the only other Borders club older than the Dumfries club was the Annan (N.B.) club formed in December 1867.

Dumfries was founded in October 1869 as a rugby union club, but changed to association rules in 1870. The club however switched back to rugby union in 1877; the club's final reported association match was a 2–0 defeat to Maybole in October 1877.

The name was used by at least two other senior other clubs later, the next existing from 1889 to 1892, and the third merging into Queen of the South F.C.; and a more recent junior club now called Heston Rovers.

== Colours ==
The club's colours were red, white, and blue, probably in hoops as that was the dominant style of the day.

== Ground ==
The club played at Dock Park, five minutes from the railway station.
