= James Boe =

English footballer

Personal information
- Full name: James Boe
- Date of birth: 5 January 1891
- Place of birth: Gateshead, England
- Date of death: 1973 (aged 81–82)
- Place of death: County Durham, England
- Position: Goalkeeper

Youth career
- Gateshead Rodsley

Senior career*
Years	Team	Apps	(Gls)
1914–1915	Sunderland	1	(0)
1919	Southport Central		
- * Club domestic league appearances and goals

James Boe (5 January 1891 – 1973) was an English professional footballer who played as a goalkeeper for Sunderland.
