= Arthur Wilkinson (cricketer) =

English cricketer

Arthur Wilkinson (28 December 1872 – unknown) was an English first-class cricketer active 1894–95 who played for Nottinghamshire. He was born in Nottingham.
