= Chris Elvidge =

English footballer

Personal information
- Full name: Christopher Joseph Elvidge
- Date of birth: 4 April 1892
- Place of birth: Stourbridge, West Midlands, England
- Position: Inside left

Senior career*
Years	Team	Apps	(Gls)
- Hereford Town
1921–1922	Wrexham	12	(1)
- Shrewsbury Town
- * Club domestic league appearances and goals

Christopher Joseph Elvidge (4 April 1892 – date of death unknown) was an English professional footballer who played as an inside left. He made appearances in the English Football League for Wrexham, playing in their first season as part of the English Football League.

He also played for Hereford Town and Shrewsbury Town outside of the English Football League.
