= Art Wilkinson =

Australian rules footballer

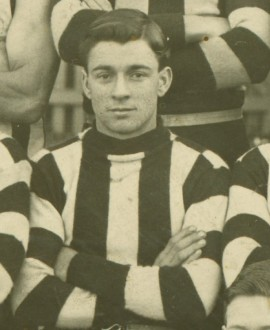
- Wilkinson in 1912

Personal information
- Full name: Arthur Wilkinson
- Born: 15 August 1888; Melton Mowbray, England
- Died: 13 August 1969 (aged 80); Macleod, Victoria
- Original team: Kilmore
- Height: 179 cm (5 ft 10 in)
- Weight: 78 kg (172 lb)

Playing career^{1}
Years	Club	Games (Goals)
1912	Collingwood	11 (8)
1913	Essendon	2 (0)
Total		13 (8)
- ^{1} Playing statistics correct to the end of 1913.

Arthur Wilkinson (15 August 1888 – 13 August 1969) was an Australian rules footballer who played for the Collingwood Football Club and Essendon Football Club in the Victorian Football League (VFL).

He later played with Hawthorn in the Victorian Football Association.
