= 1890 in association football =

The following are the association football events of the year 1890 throughout the world.

== Events ==
- The first Scottish Football League competition is inaugurated. The ten founder members are Abercorn, Cambuslang, Celtic, Cowlairs, Dumbarton, Hearts, Rangers, St Mirren, Third Lanark and Vale of Leven. An eleventh team Renton was also a founder member but was subsequently expelled for professionalism, the game being officially amateur at the time.
- Royal Arsenal move from the Manor Ground to the nearby Invicta Ground.

== Clubs founded in 1890 ==
=== England ===
- Chertsey Town F.C.
- Fleet Town F.C.
- Forest Green Rovers F.C.
- Grays Athletic F.C.
- Shildon A.F.C.
- Weymouth F.C.
- Sheppey United F.C.

=== Spain ===
- Sevilla FC

=== Switzerland ===
- Servette FC

== Winners Club National Championship ==
Nation	Tournament	Winner	Runner-up	Title	Previous title won
Denmark	Football Tournament	Akademisk Boldklub	Kjøbenhavns Boldklub	1st	None
England	Football League	Preston North End	Everton	2nd	1889
Netherlands	Football League Championship	Koninkiljke	RAP	1st	None

== Domestic Cups ==
=== Asia ===
Nation	Tournament	Winner	Score	Runner-up	Venue	Title	Previous title won
India	Durand Cup	Highland Light Infantry	4-2 (after extra time following 0-0 draw)	Royal Irish Fusiliers	Annadale	2nd	1889

=== Europe ===
Nation	Tournament	Winner	Score	Runner-up	Venue	Title	Previous title won
England	FA Cup	Blackburn Rovers	6-1	The Wednesday	Kennington Oval	4th	1886
Ireland	Irish Cup	Gordon Highlanders	3-0	Cliftonville	Ulsterville	1st	None
Scotland	Scottish Cup	Queen's Park	2-1 (replay following 1-1 draw)	Vale of Leven	Ibrox Park	9th	1886
Wales	Welsh Cup	Chirk	1-0	Wrexham	Racecourse Ground	3rd	1888

== International tournaments ==
- 1890 British Home Championship (February 8 – April 5, 1890)

Shared by England and Scotland

== Births ==
- 7 April - Paul Berth (d. 1969), Danish international (1911-1922).
- 11 April – Felix von Heijden (d. 1982), Netherlands international (1920).
- 20 August – Caesar ten Cate (d. 1972), Netherlands international (1912).
- 4 December – Alex Donaldson (d. 1972), Scotland international forward in six matches (1914–1922).
