= Irish football =

Irish football may refer to:

- Association football in the Republic of Ireland
- Association football in Northern Ireland
- Gaelic football
- Rugby union in Ireland
- Rugby league in Ireland
- Australian rules football in Ireland
- Category:American football in Ireland

== Governing bodies ==
=== Association football ===
- Football Association of Ireland (ROI), the governing body for association football in the Republic of Ireland
- Irish Football Association (NI), the governing body for association football in Northern Ireland

=== Gaelic football ===
- Gaelic Athletic Association, Irish organization that promotes indigenous Gaelic games

== See also ==
- Notre Dame Fighting Irish football, an American football team in Notre Dame, Indiana
