= Arthur Wilkinson =

British composer (1919-1968)

Arthur Wilkinson (3 September 1919 – 1968) was a British orchestral composer and arranger. He was born in Ealing, attending Ealing Grammar School, and began his professional career as a trumpeter for the Jack Hylton orchestra. While serving in the Royal Air Force during World War II, he began arranging and composing for the Squadronaires. This led to much other work in film, stage shows, radio and television.

He composed incidental music for BBC radio (including Life with the Lyons from 1951 until 1956, and for The Goon Show from 1951), and was a regular contributor to many BBC radio and television music and variety programmes, including Eric Robson's Music for You series (1952-1966), and (from 1967) Melodies for You.

He was the arranger of many shows by David Heneker produced in London's West End, including Half a Sixpence (1963) and Charlie Girl (1963). He also orchestrated Ivor Novello's last show, Gay's the Word' (1951).

Wilkinson was married to Dorothy Ann Henning. He died of a heart attack in Hammersmith, London at the age of 49. His address in the 1960s was Brambletye, Mellow Close, Banstead in Surrey.

== Notable works ==
- The Three Rivers Fantasy, a pastiche of popular folk tunes from North-East England was commissioned by Tyne Tees Television. It ran every day at the opening of transmission from January 1959 until May 1983.
- Arrangements for the original London production of the musical Charlie Girl.
- The Beatlecracker Suite, an arrangement of songs by The Beatles into movements of Tchaikovsky's The Nutcracker Suite.
- The Legend of the Glass Mountain by Nino Rota, arrangement recorded by Mantovani, George Melachrino and piano duo Rawicz and Landauer.
- Danse Mexicane, original composition recorded by George Melachrino.
- Ballet scores Orpheus & Eurydice, Quartete and Quirida (commissioned by John Gilpin).
- Fantasy for piano and orchestra

== In popular culture ==
His songs "Hippo Bird", "House Mouse", "Little Puck", and "Swoon" were used in TV shows like, Ren & Stimpy Adult Party Cartoon and SpongeBob SquarePants

== Selected filmography ==
- A Song for Tomorrow (1948)
- Trouble in the Air (1948)
- A Piece of Cake (1948) : music
- It's Not Cricket (1949) : music
- The Golden Year (1951) : special orchestrations
- Come Back Peter (1952)
- The Limping Man (1953)
