= 1891–92 Football League =

4th season of the Football League

The Football League
- Season: 1891–92
- Champions: Sunderland (1st English title)
- Relegated: Darwen
- New Club in League: Darwen, Stoke
- FA Cup winners: West Bromwich Albion (2nd FA Cup title)
- Matches: 182
- Goals: 777 (4.27 per match)
- Top goalscorer: John Campbell (Sunderland), 32
- Biggest home win: West Bromwich Albion – Darwen 12–0 (4 April 1892)
- Biggest away win: Darwen – Sunderland 1–7 (23 April 1892)
- Highest scoring: Aston Villa – Accrington 12–2 (12 March 1892)
- Average attendance: 6,193

The 1891–92 Football League was the fourth season of English league football, and the last season of the football league running in a single division. Sunderland were the winners of the league which was their first league success. At the beginning of the season Stoke had left the Football Alliance and rejoined the Football League. Darwen also joined from the Alliance but they conceded 112 goals and finished bottom.

== Final league table ==
The table below is reproduced here in the exact form that it can be found at the Rec.Sport.Soccer Statistics Foundation website and in Rothmans Book of Football League Records 1888–89 to 1978–79, with home and away statistics separated.

Beginning with the season 1894–95, clubs finishing level on points were separated according to goal average (goals scored divided by goals conceded). In case one or more teams had the same goal difference, this system favoured those teams who had scored fewer goals. The goal average system was eventually scrapped beginning with the 1976–77 season.

During the first five seasons of the league, that is until the season 1893–94 re-election process concerned the clubs which finished in the bottom four of the league.

Pos	Team	Pld	W	D	L	GF	GA	GAv	Pts	Qualification
1	Sunderland (C)	26	21	0	5	93	36	2.583	42	
2	Preston North End	26	18	1	7	61	31	1.968	37	
3	Bolton Wanderers	26	17	2	7	51	37	1.378	36	
4	Aston Villa	26	15	0	11	89	56	1.589	30	
5	Everton	26	12	4	10	49	49	1.000	28	
6	Wolverhampton Wanderers	26	11	4	11	59	46	1.283	26	
7	Burnley	26	11	4	11	49	45	1.089	26	
8	Notts County	26	11	4	11	55	51	1.078	26	
9	Blackburn Rovers	26	10	6	10	58	65	0.892	26	
10	Derby County	26	10	4	12	46	52	0.885	24	
11	Accrington	26	8	4	14	40	78	0.513	20	Re-elected
12	West Bromwich Albion	26	6	6	14	51	58	0.879	18	Reprieved from re-election (Note: West Bromwich Albion were reprieved from re-election due to winning the 1891–92 FA Cup.)
13	Stoke	26	5	4	17	38	61	0.623	14	Re-elected
14	Darwen (R)	26	4	3	19	38	112	0.339	11	Failed re-election and demoted to the Second Division

(C) Champions; (R) Relegated

=== Results ===
Home \ Away	ACC	AST	BLB	BOL	BUR	DRW	DER	EVE	NTC	PNE	STK	SUN	WBA	WOL
Accrington		3–2	1–0	0–3	1–0	1–1	1–1	1–1	2–0	1–3	3–0	3–5	4–2	3–2
Aston Villa	12–2		5–1	1–2	6–1	7–0	6–0	3–4	5–1	3–1	2–1	5–3	5–1	3–6
Blackburn Rovers	2–2	4–3		4–0	3–3	4–0	0–2	2–2	5–4	2–4	5–3	3–1	3–2	2–0
Bolton Wanderers	3–4	1–2	4–2		2–0	1–0	3–1	1–0	2–0	3–0	1–1	4–3	1–1	3–0
Burnley	2–1	4–1	3–0	1–2		9–0	2–4	1–0	1–0	2–0	4–1	1–2	3–2	1–1
Darwen	5–2	1–5	3–5	1–2	2–6		2–0	3–1	2–3	0–4	9–3	1–7	1–1	1–4
Derby County	3–1	4–2	1–1	3–2	0–1	7–0		0–3	3–0	1–2	3–3	0–1	1–1	2–1
Everton	3–0	5–1	3–1	2–5	1–1	5–3	1–2		4–0	1–1	1–0	0–4	4–3	2–1
Notts County	9–0	5–2	2–2	2–0	5–1	5–0	2–1	1–3		2–0	1–1	1–0	4–0	2–2
Preston North End	4–1	0–1	3–2	4–0	5–1	4–0	3–0	4–0	6–0		3–2	3–1	1–0	2–0
Stoke	3–1	2–3	0–1	0–1	3–0	5–1	2–1	0–1	1–3	0–1		1–3	1–0	1–3
Sunderland	4–1	2–1	6–1	4–1	2–1	7–0	7–1	2–1	4–0	4–1	4–1		4–0	5–2
West Bromwich Albion	3–1	0–3	2–2	0–2	1–0	12–0	4–2	4–0	2–2	1–2	2–2	2–5		4–3
Wolverhampton Wanderers	5–0	2–0	6–1	1–2	0–0	2–2	1–3	5–1	2–1	3–0	4–1	1–3	2–1	

Updated to match(es) played on unknown. Source: The Rec.Sport.Soccer Statistics Foundation website and from Rothmans Book of Football League Records 1888–89 to 1978–79.
Legend: Blue = home team win; Yellow = draw; Red = away team win.

=== Maps ===
Locations of the Football League teams

== Re-election process ==
Two clubs were re-elected to the League in the re-election process. West Bromwich Albion, although finishing in the bottom four teams, were not required to seek re-election as they were the FA Cup holders. Two of the other three teams were duly re-elected. As a result, three new teams were elected to the League. The voting went as follows:

Team	Votes	Result
The Wednesday	10	Elected to the League
Nottingham Forest	9	Elected to the League
Accrington	7	Re-elected to the League
Stoke	6	Re-elected to the League
Newton Heath	6	Elected to the League
Sheffield United	5	Not elected to the League
Darwen	4	Not re-elected to the League
Burton Swifts	1	Not elected to the League
Newcastle East End	1	Not elected to the League
Middlesbrough / Middlesbrough Ironopolis (combined)	1	Not elected to the League
Liverpool Caledonian	0	Not elected to the League

Key	
	Re-elected to the League
	Elected to the League
	Not (re-)elected to the League; later invited to participate in the Second Division
	Not elected to the League

When the Second Division was added to the league the following year, Darwen were elected to participate, effectively becoming the first club to be relegated from the First Division to the Second Division. The other teams to participate in the Second Division were drawn from the Football Alliance except for Birmingham St. George's, who left and was replaced with Sheffield United of the Northern League.

== Attendances ==
No.	Club	Average
1	Everton FC	10,730
2	Sunderland AFC	8,225
3	Bolton Wanderers FC	7,500
4	Aston Villa FC	7,045
5	Preston North End FC	6,225
6	West Bromwich Albion FC	6,195
7	Burnley FC	6,125
8	Notts County FC	6,100
9	Derby County FC	5,965
10	Blackburn Rovers FC	5,105
11	Darwen FC	4,920
12	Wolverhampton Wanderers FC	4,850
13	Stoke City FC	3,950
14	Accrington FC	3,770

== See also ==
- 1891–92 in English football
- 1891 in association football
- 1892 in association football
