= Thorneyholme Road =

Sports venue in Accrington, England

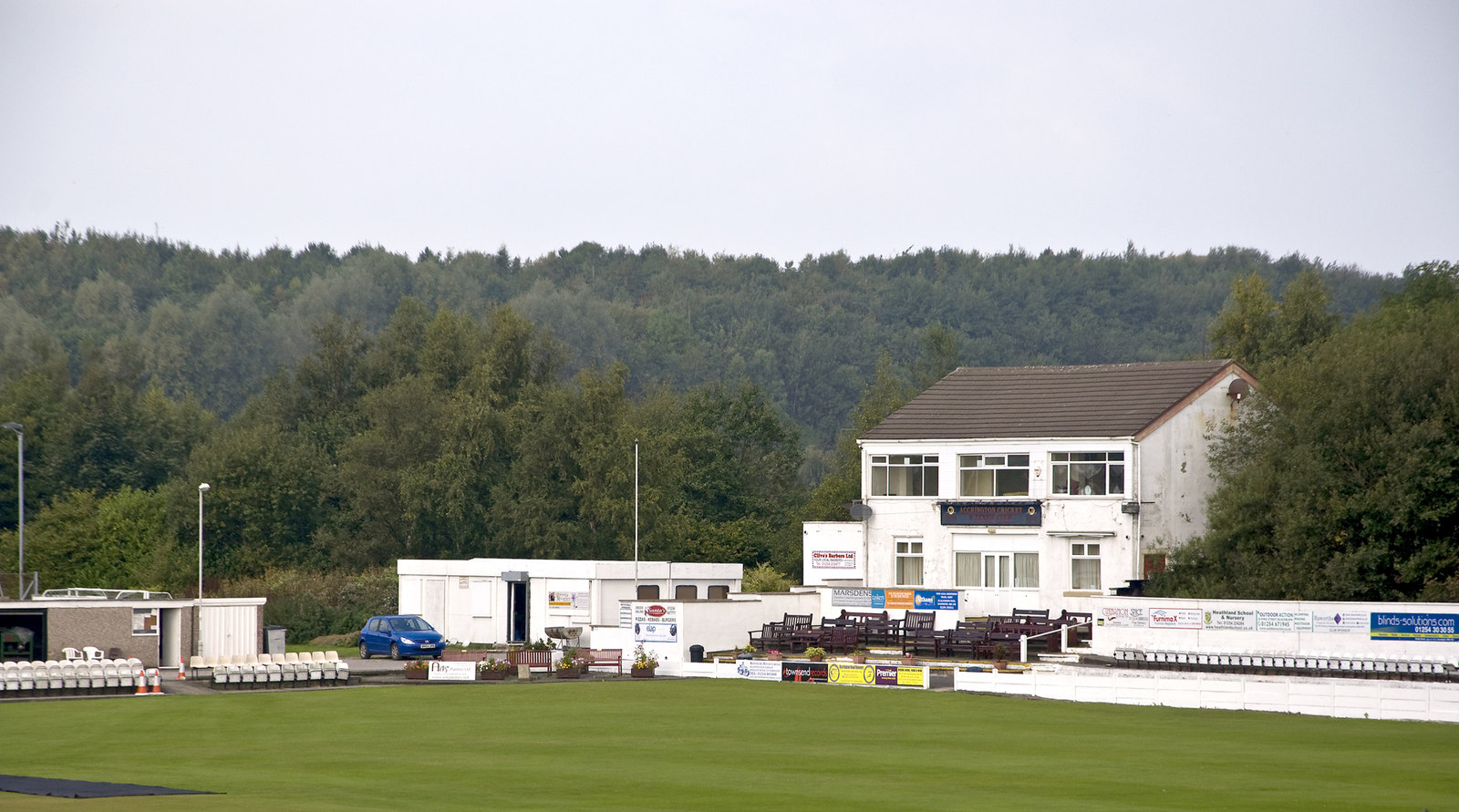
- Accrington Cricket Club in the grounds (2014)
- Interactive map of Thorneyholme Road
- Location: Accrington, England
- Coordinates: 53.7647°N 2.3594°W
- Surface: Grass

Construction
- Opened: 1878

Tenants
- Accrington Cricket Club (1878–); Accrington F.C. (1878–1896)

Thorneyholme Road is a cricket and former football ground in Accrington, England. It is the home ground of Accrington Cricket Club, and was the home ground of Accrington F.C. from 1878 until 1896 when they dissolved.

== History ==
Thorneyholme Road was opened as a cricket ground in 1878 when Accrington Cricket Club moved to the site. Accrington F.C. were founded in the same year, and also became based at the ground. The football pitch was located at the western end of the ground, with a covered stand and some uncovered seating built on the western touchline and more uncovered seating installed behind both goals.

Accrington F.C. were founder members of the Football League in 1888, and the first league match was played at Thorneyholme Road on 6 October 1888. Accrington drew 4–4 with Wolverhampton Wanderers in front of 4,000 spectators. The record league attendance of 10,000 was set on 2 January 1893 for a local derby with Blackburn Rovers. At the end of the 1892–93 season Accrington finished next to bottom of the First Division. After losing the promotion/relegation test match to Sheffield United, Accrington resigned from the Football League rather than be relegated to Division Two.

Instead, the club moved to the Lancashire League, and in 1895 switched to the Lancashire Combination, subsequently folding during the 1895–96 season. The area where the football ground was located is now covered by tennis courts.
