= 1892–93 Football League =

5th season of the Football League

The Football League
- Season: 1892–93
- Champions: Sunderland
- Resigned: Accrington, Bootle

The 1892–93 Football League season, was the fifth season of Football League. This season saw the introduction of the Second Division.

== First Division ==
First Division
- Season: 1892–93
- Champions: Sunderland; 2nd title
- Relegated: Notts County
- Matches: 240
- Goals: 936 (3.9 per match)
- Top goalscorer: John Campbell (31 goals)
- Biggest home win: Newton Heath 10–1 Wolverhampton Wanderers (15 October 1892)
- Biggest away win: Accrington 0–6 Sunderland (3 September 1892)
- Highest scoring: Newton Heath 10–1 Wolverhampton Wanderers (15 October 1892)
- Longest winning run: 8 matches Everton
- Longest unbeaten run: 10 matches Sunderland
- Longest losing run: 7 matches The Wednesday
- Highest attendance: 27,500; Everton 6–0 Preston North End (11 February 1893)
- Lowest attendance: 1,000; Notts County 8–1 West Bromwich Albion (19 November 1892); West Bromwich Albion 1–2 Stoke (26 November 1892); Stoke 7–1 Newton Heath (7 January 1893); West Bromwich Albion 7–1 Burnley (7 January 1893); Stoke 0–1 Everton (28 January 1893); The Wednesday 3–2 Notts County (3 April 1893)
- Average attendance: 6,920

Pos	Team	Pld	W	D	L	GF	GA	GAv	Pts	Relegation
1	Sunderland (C)	30	22	4	4	100	36	2.778	48	
2	Preston North End	30	17	3	10	57	39	1.462	37	
3	Everton	30	16	4	10	74	51	1.451	36	
4	Aston Villa	30	16	3	11	73	62	1.177	35	
5	Bolton Wanderers	30	13	6	11	56	55	1.018	32	
6	Burnley	30	13	4	13	51	44	1.159	30	
7	Stoke	30	12	5	13	58	48	1.208	29	
8	West Bromwich Albion	30	12	5	13	58	69	0.841	29	
9	Blackburn Rovers	30	8	13	9	47	56	0.839	29	
10	Nottingham Forest	30	10	8	12	48	52	0.923	28	
11	Wolverhampton Wanderers	30	12	4	14	47	68	0.691	28	
12	The Wednesday	30	12	3	15	55	65	0.846	27	
13	Derby County	30	9	9	12	52	64	0.813	27	
14	Notts County (R)	30	10	4	16	53	61	0.869	24	Qualification for test matches
15	Accrington (R)	30	6	11	13	57	81	0.704	23	Resigned from league after test matches (Note: Accrington did not join the Second Division for the following season after losing their test match.)
16	Newton Heath (O)	30	6	6	18	50	85	0.588	18	Qualification for test matches

Source: World Football
Rules for classification: 1) Points; 2) Goal average; 3) Goals scored
(C) Champions; (O) Play-off winners; (R) Relegated

=== Results ===
Home \ Away	ACC	AST	BLB	BOL	BUR	DER	EVE	NWH	NOT	NTC	PNE	STK	SUN	WED	WBA	WOL
Accrington		1–1	1–1	1–1	0–4	0–3	0–3	2–2	1–1	4–2	1–2	5–2	0–6	4–2	5–4	4–0
Aston Villa	6–4		4–1	1–1	1–3	6–1	4–1	2–0	1–0	3–1	3–1	3–2	1–6	5–1	5–2	5–0
Blackburn Rovers	3–3	2–2		3–0	2–0	2–2	2–2	4–3	0–1	1–0	0–0	3–3	2–2	0–2	2–1	3–3
Bolton Wanderers	5–2	5–0	2–1		1–0	0–3	4–1	4–1	3–1	4–1	2–4	4–4	2–1	1–0	3–1	3–1
Burnley	1–3	0–2	0–0	3–0		2–1	3–0	4–1	1–1	3–0	4–2	3–2	2–3	4–0	5–0	2–0
Derby County	3–3	2–1	3–0	1–1	1–0		1–6	5–1	2–3	4–5	1–2	1–0	1–1	2–2	1–1	2–2
Everton	1–1	1–0	4–0	3–0	0–1	5–0		6–0	2–2	6–0	6–0	2–2	1–4	3–5	1–0	3–2
Newton Heath	3–3	2–0	4–4	1–0	1–1	7–1	3–4		1–3	1–3	2–1	1–0	0–5	1–5	2–4	10–1
Nottingham Forest	3–0	4–5	0–1	2–0	2–2	1–0	2–1	1–1		3–1	1–2	3–4	0–5	2–0	3–4	3–1
Notts County	2–0	1–4	0–0	2–2	3–1	1–1	1–2	4–0	3–0		3–1	0–1	3–1	0–1	8–1	3–0
Preston North End	0–0	4–1	2–1	2–1	2–0	0–1	5–0	2–1	1–0	4–0		2–1	1–2	4–1	1–1	4–0
Stoke	2–2	0–1	2–2	6–0	4–1	1–3	0–1	7–1	3–0	1–0	2–1		0–1	2–0	1–2	2–1
Sunderland	4–2	6–0	5–0	3–3	2–0	3–1	4–3	6–0	1–0	2–2	2–0	3–1		4–2	8–1	5–2
The Wednesday	5–2	5–3	0–3	4–2	2–0	3–3	0–2	1–0	2–2	3–2	0–5	0–1	3–2		6–0	0–1
West Bromwich Albion	4–0	3–2	1–2	1–0	7–1	3–1	3–0	0–0	2–2	4–2	0–1	1–2	1–3	3–0		2–1
Wolverhampton Wanderers	5–3	2–1	4–2	1–2	1–0	2–1	2–4	2–0	2–2	3–0	2–1	1–0	2–0	2–0	1–1	

Source: The Rec.Sport.Soccer Statistics Foundation
Legend: Blue = home team win; Yellow = draw; Red = away team win.

=== Maps ===
Locations of the Football League First Division teams

== Second Division ==
Second Division
- Season: 1892–93
- Champions: Small Heath
- Promoted: Sheffield United; Darwen
- Matches: 132
- Goals: 591 (4.48 per match)
- Top goalscorer: Fred Wheldon (24 goals)
- Biggest home win: Small Heath 12–0 Walsall Town Swifts (17 December 1892)
- Biggest away win: Burslem Port Vale 0–10 Sheffield United (10 December 1892)
- Highest scoring: Small Heath 12–0 Walsall Town Swifts (17 December 1892)
- Longest winning run: 9 matches Small Heath
- Longest unbeaten run: 15 matches Sheffield United
- Longest losing run: 5 matches Ardwick; Bootle; Crewe Alexandra; Walsall Town Swifts

Pos	Team	Pld	W	D	L	GF	GA	GAv	Pts	Qualification or relegation
1	Small Heath (C)	22	17	2	3	90	35	2.571	36	Qualification for test matches
2	Sheffield United (O, P)	22	16	3	3	62	19	3.263	35	Qualification for test matches
3	Darwen (O, P)	22	14	2	6	60	36	1.667	30	Qualification for test matches
4	Grimsby Town	22	11	1	10	42	41	1.024	23	
5	Ardwick	22	9	3	10	45	40	1.125	21	
6	Burton Swifts	22	9	2	11	47	47	1.000	20	
7	Northwich Victoria	22	9	2	11	42	58	0.724	20	
8	Bootle (Note: Bootle was liquidated at the end of the season.)	22	8	3	11	49	63	0.778	19	Resigned from league and folded
9	Lincoln City	22	7	3	12	45	51	0.882	17	Re-elected
10	Crewe Alexandra	22	6	3	13	42	69	0.609	15	Re-elected
11	Burslem Port Vale	22	6	3	13	30	57	0.526	15	Re-elected
12	Walsall Town Swifts	22	5	3	14	37	75	0.493	13	Re-elected

Rules for classification: 1) Points; 2) Goal average; 3) Goals scored
(C) Champions; (O) Play-off winners; (P) Promoted

=== Results ===
Home \ Away	ARD	BOO	BPV	BRS	CRE	DRW	GRI	LIN	NOR	SHU	SMH	WAL
Ardwick		7–0	2–0	1–1	3–1	4–2	0–3	3–1	1–1	2–3	2–2	2–0
Bootle	5–3		1–1	3–2	2–1	5–1	3–1	4–1	2–5	2–0	1–4	7–1
Burslem Port Vale	1–2	0–0		1–0	4–1	2–4	0–1	1–2	4–0	0–10	0–3	3–0
Burton Swifts	2–0	2–1	3–3		7–1	0–2	5–1	4–2	2–0	0–3	2–3	3–2
Crewe Alexandra	4–1	2–1	5–0	2–4		2–2	1–0	4–1	4–2	0–4	1–3	5–6
Darwen	3–1	3–0	4–1	2–3	7–3		6–1	3–1	3–1	3–1	4–3	5–0
Grimsby Town	2–0	3–0	2–0	4–0	4–0	0–1		2–2	2–1	0–1	3–2	3–0
Lincoln City	2–1	5–1	3–4	5–1	1–1	1–1	1–3		5–1	1–0	3–4	3–1
Northwich Victoria	0–3	3–2	2–4	2–1	4–1	1–0	5–3	2–1		1–3	0–6	5–2
Sheffield United	2–1	8–3	4–0	3–1	4–0	2–0	2–0	4–2	1–1		2–0	3–0
Small Heath	3–2	6–2	5–1	3–2	6–0	6–2	8–3	4–1	6–2	1–1		12–0
Walsall Town Swifts	2–4	4–4	3–0	3–2	3–3	1–2	3–1	2–1	2–3	1–1	1–3	

Updated to match(es) played on unknown. Source: Ian Laschke: Rothmans Book of Football League Records 1888–89 to 1978–79. Macdonald and Jane’s, London & Sydney, 1980.
Legend: Blue = home team win; Yellow = draw; Red = away team win.

=== Maps ===
Locations of the Football League Second Division teams

== Test matches ==
The test matches were neutral-venue play-offs between the bottom 3 First Division teams and the top 3 Second Division teams. The First Division teams, if coming out as winners, would retain their places in the division. If a Second Division team won, it would be considered for First Division membership through an election process. Losing Second Division teams would stay in the Second Division.

22 April 1893

Small Heath (2nd Div. Champion)	1–1	Newton Heath (1st Div. 16th)

Victoria Ground
Attendance: 4,000
22 April 1893

Darwen (2nd Div. 3rd)	3–2	Notts County (1st Div. 14th)

Hyde Road
Attendance: 5,000
22 April 1893

Sheffield United (2nd Div. 2nd)	1–0	Accrington (1st Div. 15th)

Castle Ground
Attendance: 6,000
27 April 1893 (rematch)

Newton Heath (1st Div. 16th)	5–2	Small Heath (2nd Div. Champion)

Olive Grove
Attendance: 6,000

=== Consequences ===
Of the winners, Darwen and Sheffield United were elected into the First Division, while Newton Heath (later known as Manchester United F.C.) remained in the First Division.

Of the losers Small Heath (later known as Birmingham City F.C.) and Notts County continued in the Second Division, while Accrington resigned from the league altogether.

== Attendances ==
No.	Club	Average
1	Everton	13,230
2	The Wednesday	10,500
3	Nottingham Forest	8,075
4	Sunderland	7,815
5	Aston Villa	7,605
6	Notts County	7,475
7	Newton Heath	7,080
8	Burnley	6,805
9	Preston North End	6,675
10	Derby County	5,990
11	Blackburn Rovers	5,970
12	Bolton Wanderers	5,790
13	Wolverhampton Wanderers	5,520
14	Stoke	5,070
15	West Bromwich Albion	4,665
16	Accrington	4,000

== See also ==
- 1892–93 in English football
- 1892 in association football
