= 1889–90 Football League =

2nd season of the Football League

The Football League
- Season: 1889–90
- Champions: Preston North End; 2nd English title
- Matches: 132
- Goals: 611 (4.63 per match)
- Top goalscorer: Jimmy Ross (24 goals)
- Biggest home win: Preston North End 10–0 Stoke (14 September 1889)
- Biggest away win: Accrington 1–8 Notts County (12 October 1889)
- Highest scoring: Preston North End 10–0 Stoke (14 September 1889); Blackburn Rovers 9–1 Notts County (16 November 1889); Wolverhampton Wanderers 9–1 Burnley (7 December 1889)
- Longest winning run: 6 matches Everton; Preston North End
- Longest unbeaten run: 7 matches Accrington; Blackburn Rovers; Preston North End
- Longest losing run: 10 matches Stoke
- Average attendance: 5,466

The 1889–90 Football League was the second season of English league football, with Preston North End being crowned as the champions for the second successive season. The clubs competing were the 12 original clubs which were the founders of the league the previous year. Unlike the modern system, two points were awarded for a win, with one for a draw and no points for a loss; this system remained until three points for a win were awarded beginning with the 1981–82 season.

== Final league table ==
During the first five seasons of the league (until the 1893–94 season), the re-election process concerned the clubs which finished in the bottom four of the league.

Pos	Team	Pld	W	D	L	GF	GA	GAv	Pts	Relegation
1	Preston North End (C)	22	15	3	4	71	30	2.367	33	
2	Everton	22	14	3	5	65	40	1.625	31	
3	Blackburn Rovers	22	12	3	7	78	41	1.902	27	
4	Wolverhampton Wanderers	22	10	5	7	51	38	1.342	25	
5	West Bromwich Albion	22	11	3	8	47	50	0.940	25	
6	Accrington	22	9	6	7	53	56	0.946	24	
7	Derby County	22	9	3	10	43	55	0.782	21	
8	Aston Villa	22	7	5	10	43	51	0.843	19	
9	Bolton Wanderers	22	9	1	12	54	65	0.831	19	
10	Notts County	22	6	5	11	43	51	0.843	17	Re-elected
11	Burnley	22	4	5	13	36	65	0.554	13	Re-elected
12	Stoke (R)	22	3	4	15	27	69	0.391	10	Failed re-election and demoted to the Football Alliance

Source: World Football
Rules for classification: 1) Points; 2) Goal average; 3) Goals scored
(C) Champions; (R) Relegated

=== Results ===
Home \ Away	ACC	AST	BLB	BOL	BUR	DER	EVE	NTC	PNE	STK	WBA	WOL
Accrington		4–2	2–2	3–1	2–2	6–1	5–3	1–8	2–2	2–1	0–0	6–3
Aston Villa	1–2		3–0	1–2	2–2	7–1	1–2	1–1	5–3	6–1	1–0	2–1
Blackburn Rovers	3–2	7–0		7–1	7–1	4–2	2–4	9–1	3–4	8–0	5–0	4–3
Bolton Wanderers	2–4	2–0	3–2		2–2	7–1	3–4	0–4	2–6	5–0	7–0	4–1
Burnley	2–2	2–6	1–2	7–0		2–0	0–1	3–0	0–3	1–3	1–2	1–2
Derby County	2–3	5–0	4–0	3–2	4–1		2–2	2–0	2–1	2–0	3–1	3–3
Everton	2–2	7–0	3–2	3–0	2–1	3–0		5–3	1–5	8–0	5–1	1–1
Notts County	3–1	1–1	1–1	3–5	1–1	3–1	4–3		0–1	3–1	1–2	0–2
Preston North End	3–1	3–2	1–1	3–1	6–0	5–0	1–2	4–3		10–0	5–0	0–2
Stoke	7–1	1–1	0–3	0–1	3–4	1–1	1–2	1–1	1–2		1–3	2–1
West Bromwich Albion	4–1	3–0	3–2	6–3	6–1	2–3	4–1	4–2	2–2	2–1		1–4
Wolverhampton Wanderers	2–1	1–1	2–4	5–1	9–1	2–1	2–1	2–0	0–1	2–2	1–1	

Updated to match(es) played on unknown. Source: the Rec.Sport.Soccer Statistics Foundation website and Rothmans.
Legend: Blue = home team win; Yellow = draw; Red = away team win.

=== Maps ===
Locations of the Football League teams

== Re-election process ==
At the Football League election meeting no vote was taken, and it was agreed that Burnley and Notts County were re-elected and that Sunderland was elected in place of Stoke, who played in the Football Alliance the following season but returned to the Football League after a year's absence.

The applications of Football Alliance sides Bootle, Darwen, Grimsby Town, Newton Heath and Sunderland Albion were rejected.

== Attendances ==
Everton FC drew the highest average home attendance in the second edition of the Football League.

#	Football club	Home games	Average attendance
1	Everton FC	11	10,110
2	Preston North End	11	7,650
3	Blackburn Rovers	11	7,205
4	Aston Villa	11	5,870
5	Wolverhampton Wanderers	11	5,530
6	Burnley FC	11	5,400
7	Bolton Wanderers	11	5,325
8	West Bromwich Albion	11	4,870
9	Derby County	11	3,900
10	Notts County	11	3,400
11	Stoke FC	11	3,275
12	Accrington FC	11	3,055

== See also ==
- 1889–90 in English football
- 1889 in association football
- 1890 in association football
