= 1890–91 Football League =

3rd season of the Football League

The Football League
- Season: 1890–91
- Champions: Everton; 1st English title
- Matches: 132
- Goals: 554 (4.2 per match)
- Top goalscorer: Jack Southworth (26 goals)
- Biggest home win: Derby County 9–0 Wolverhampton Wanderers (10 January 1891)
- Biggest away win: Blackburn Rovers 1–7 Notts County (14 March 1891)
- Highest scoring: Derby County 8–5 Blackburn Rovers (6 September 1890)
- Average attendance: 6,413

The 1890–91 Football League was the third Football league season. After dominating and being crowned champions for the first two football league seasons Preston North End slipped to second and Everton won the league with a two-point gap. Meanwhile, there had been changes in the league since the last football league season, Stoke had not been re-elected to the football league, so joined the rival Football Alliance. They were replaced with Sunderland, who were nicknamed "the team of all talents" at the time.

== Final league table ==
The table below is reproduced here in the exact form that it can be found at the Rec.Sport.Soccer Statistics Foundation website and in Rothmans Book of Football League Records 1888–89 to 1978–79, with home and away statistics separated.

Beginning with the season 1894–95, clubs finishing level on points were separated according to goal average (goals scored divided by goals conceded). In case one or more teams had the same goal difference, this system favoured those teams who had scored fewer goals. The goal average system was eventually scrapped beginning with the 1976–77 season. Since the goal average was used for this purpose for such a long time, it is presented in the tables below even for the seasons prior to 1894–95.

During the first five seasons of the league, that is until the season 1893–94 re-election process concerned the clubs which finished in the bottom four of the league.

Pos	Team	Pld	W	D	L	GF	GA	GAv	Pts	Qualification
1	Everton (C)	22	14	1	7	63	29	2.172	29	
2	Preston North End	22	12	3	7	44	23	1.913	27	
3	Notts County	22	11	4	7	52	35	1.486	26	
4	Wolverhampton Wanderers	22	12	2	8	39	50	0.780	26	
5	Bolton Wanderers	22	12	1	9	47	34	1.382	25	
6	Blackburn Rovers	22	11	2	9	52	43	1.209	24	
7	Sunderland	22	10	5	7	51	31	1.645	23 (Note: Sunderland were deducted two points for fielding an unregistered player.)	
8	Burnley	22	9	3	10	52	63	0.825	21	
9	Aston Villa	22	7	4	11	45	58	0.776	18	Re-elected
10	Accrington	22	6	4	12	28	50	0.560	16	Re-elected
11	Derby County	22	7	1	14	47	81	0.580	15	Re-elected
12	West Bromwich Albion	22	5	2	15	34	57	0.596	12	Re-elected

(C) Champions

=== Results ===
Home \ Away	ACC	AST	BLB	BOL	BUR	DER	EVE	NTC	PNE	SUN	WBA	WOL
Accrington		1–3	0–4	2–1	1–1	4–0	1–2	3–2	1–3	4–1	1–0	1–2
Aston Villa	3–1		2–2	5–0	4–4	4–0	2–2	3–2	0–1	0–0	0–4	6–2
Blackburn Rovers	0–0	5–1		0–2	5–2	8–0	2–1	1–7	1–0	3–2	2–1	2–3
Bolton Wanderers	6–0	4–0	2–0		1–0	3–1	0–5	4–2	1–0	2–5	7–1	6–0
Burnley	2–0	2–1	1–6	1–2		6–1	3–2	0–1	6–2	3–3	5–4	4–2
Derby County	1–2	5–4	8–5	1–1	2–4		2–6	3–1	1–3	3–1	3–1	9–0
Everton	3–2	5–0	3–1	2–0	7–3	7–0		4–2	0–1	1–0	2–3	5–0
Notts County	5–0	7–1	1–2	3–1	4–0	2–1	3–1		2–1	2–1	3–2	1–1
Preston North End	1–1	4–1	1–2	1–0	7–0	6–0	2–0	0–0		0–0	3–0	5–1
Sunderland	2–2	5–1	3–1	2–0	2–3	5–1	1–0	4–0	3–0		1–1	3–4
West Bromwich Albion	5–1	0–3	1–0	2–4	3–1	3–4	1–4	1–1	1–3	0–4		0–1
Wolverhampton Wanderers	3–0	2–1	2–0	1–0	3–1	5–1	0–1	1–1	2–0	0–3	4–0	

Updated to match(es) played on unknown. Source: the Rec.Sport.Soccer Statistics Foundation website and Rothmans.
Legend: Blue = home team win; Yellow = draw; Red = away team win.

== Team locations ==
Locations of the Football League 1890–91 teams

== Re-election process ==
The number of clubs in the Football League was to be increased by two for the 1891–92 season. In addition to the four League sides seeking re-election, six non-league clubs (five of them from the Football Alliance) also sought League membership. The voting went as follows:

Team	Votes	Result
Accrington	8	Re-elected to the League
Aston Villa	8	Re-elected to the League
Darwen	7	Elected to the League
Stoke	7	Elected to the League
Derby County	6	Re-elected to the League
West Bromwich Albion	6	Re-elected to the League
Ardwick	4	Not elected to the League
Nottingham Forest	1	Not elected to the League
Sunderland Albion	1	Not elected to the League
Newton Heath	0	Not elected to the League

== Attendances ==
No.	Club	Average
1	Everton FC	11,375
2	Blackburn Rovers FC	7,805
3	Burnley FC	7,580
4	Notts County FC	7,580
5	Preston North End FC	7,225
6	Bolton Wanderers FC	7,190
7	Aston Villa FC	6,240
8	Sunderland AFC	5,950
9	Wolverhampton Wanderers FC	5,845
10	West Bromwich Albion FC	3,920
11	Derby County FC	3,270
12	Accrington FC	2,980

== See also ==
- 1890–91 in English football
- 1890 in association football
- 1891 in association football
