= Accrington F.C. =

Former association football club in England

Accrington
- Full name: Accrington Football Club
- Nickname: The Owd Reds
- Founded: 1878
- Dissolved: 1896
- Ground: Thorneyholme Road, Accrington
- League: Lancashire Combination
- 1895–96: Record expunged
Home colours

Accrington Football Club was a football club based in Accrington, Lancashire, England. They were one of the founder members of the Football League.

== History ==
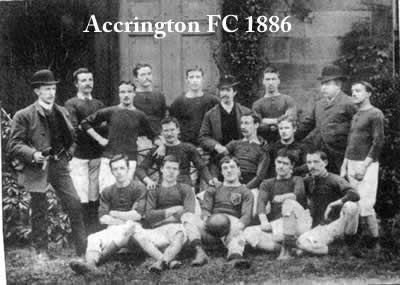
The 1886 Accrington squad

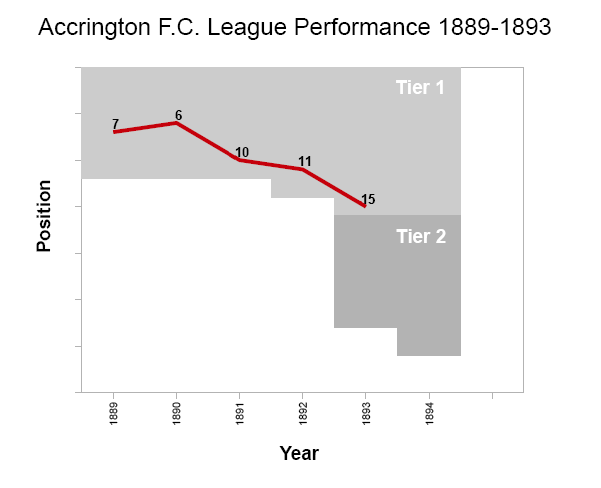
Graph showing Accrington's performance from the first season of the English Football League in 1888–89 to 1892–93 when they resigned from the league

Accrington Football Club was formed following a meeting at a local public house in 1878. It was the second association club in the town, after Enfield. The club's record appearance holder and top scorer was Johnny Kirkham, who played 117 matches and scored 37 goals during its Football League tenure.

=== Local cups ===
With backing from mill owners, the Owd Reds became one of the strongest sides in Lancashire. In 1880–81, it won the Lancashire Senior Cup for the first time, beating Blackburn Park Road 6–4 in the final. The Roadsters walked off the field with five minutes to go in protest at the refereeing, and put in an unsuccessful protest, one reporter stating that the second Accrington goal was seen as handball "by every reporter present" and the sixth Accrington goal was so far offside that "the referee (William Peirce-Dix of Sheffield) was obviously bribed or neglecting his duty as a final judge", another stating that "the greatest wrongdoer in this last piece of business connected with the already ugly career of the Lancashire Association Challenge Cup is the referee of Saturday last".

The club was part of the revolt against the Football Association in 1884 over professionalism, after being expelled from the FA the previous year for paying a player, and was a founding member of the British Football Association, in a successful ploy to have the FA overturn its ban on professionals. It won the Lancashire Senior Cup twice more; in 1887–88 by forfeit, after Preston North End refused to play the final in Blackburn, and in 1888–89. Accrington was fortunate to be in the final, turning up late to its third round tie at Halliwell, which claimed the tie; however, before the crowd had left, Accrington turned up and the tie took place, the Owd Reds winning 1–0. The final, against underdogs Higher Walton, ended 1-1 and around 6,000 turned up to Deepdale for the replay, in which the Owd Reds scored the only goal.

=== FA Cup ===
The club had less fortune in the FA Cup, as the regionalization of the early rounds in the 1880s meant it was drawn against strong Lancastrian sides. Its best run, in 1887–88, saw it beat Rossendale by an easy 11–0, and then beat Burnley 3–2 at home, coming from 2–0 down at half-time, before a crowd of at least 5,000; however the club was then drawn to host Blackburn Rovers, which had just had a three-season winning run in the competition. Harry Fecitt gave Accrington the lead against his former club, the goal followed by a burst of music from the Accrington Volunteer Band, but Rovers rallied to win 3–1.

=== Football League and decline ===
It was one of the original twelve clubs that formed the Football League on 17 April 1888. Accrington's best season was in 1889–90, when the club finished sixth in the table. However, in the 1892–93 season they finished fifteenth (of 16) and were relegated after losing a test match 1–0 against Sheffield United at Trent Bridge. Accrington then resigned from the league rather than play in the Second Division, becoming the first of the founding Football League clubs to leave the League permanently (Stoke had failed to be re-elected in 1890, but rejoined the league a year later).

After its first season in the Lancashire League, Accrington, realizing that business was better in the national competition, unsuccessfully applied for re-election to the Football League. Shortly afterwards, Accrington F.C. suffered financial problems, which eventually led to its demise. The club continued outside the league until 1896, when they finally folded following a 12–0 defeat on 14 January against Darwen in the Lancashire Senior Cup. The growth of the Football League, and the increased - and consistent - crowds of clubs in bigger population areas, had dwarfed the money available to Accrington from its benefactors, and, with bigger towns close by, Accrington had no room to breathe.

Accrington did not have a Football League club again until in 1921–22 the Lancashire Combination league's Accrington Stanley (formerly a local rival), became a member as part of a major expansion of the league.

== Colours ==
The club originally wore scarlet and black jerseys and hose, with black knickers. In 1880 the club changed to red jerseys and white knickers, changing the knickers to serge blue from 1888 to 1892.

== Ground ==
The Owd Reds played at Accrington Cricket Club's ground in Thorneyholme Road, which is still in use for that sport today.

== League and Cup history ==
Season	Division	Pos.	Pl.	W	D	L	GS	GA	P	FA Cup	Notes
1881–82	No leagues in existence									Second round	
1882–83	No leagues in existence									First round	
1883–84	No leagues in existence									Second round	Disqualified (Note: Accrington defeated Blackburn Park Road 3–2, but both clubs were disqualified)
1884–85	No leagues in existence									First round	Disqualified (Note: Accrington defeated Southport Central 3–0, but was disqualified)
1885–86	No leagues in existence									Second round	
1886–87	No leagues in existence									First round	
1887–88	No leagues in existence									Third round	
1888–89	Football League	7	22	6	8	8	48	48	20	First round	
1889–90	Football League	6	22	9	6	7	53	56	24	Second round	
1890–91	Football League	10	22	6	4	12	28	50	16	Second round	
1891–92	Football League	11	26	8	4	14	40	78	20	Second round	
1892–93	First Division	15	30	6	11	13	57	81	23	Second round	Relegated (Note: Relegated after Test Match (Sheffield United 1 Accrington 0) / Resigned from Football League)
1893–94	Lancashire League	4	22	11	4	7	51	39	26	First round	
1894–95	Lancashire League	12	26	10	2	14	62	63	22	–	
1895–96	Lancashire Combination	Record expunged								–	Folded in January
All-time League results: (Note: Includes Test match against Sheffield United (Sheffield United 1 Accrington 0 on 22 April 1893))			123	35	33	55	226	314	103		
All-time FA Cup results: (Note: Not included match against West Bromwich Albion (Accrington 3 West Bromwich Albion 1 on 18 January 1890) that was declared void)			14	5	2	7	24	29			

== International players ==
During its short existence the club had three players selected for the England national team:

- George Haworth – 5 caps (1887–1890)
- Joe Lofthouse – 1 cap (1890)
- Jimmy Whitehead – 1 cap (1893)
