= List of Manchester United F.C. managers =

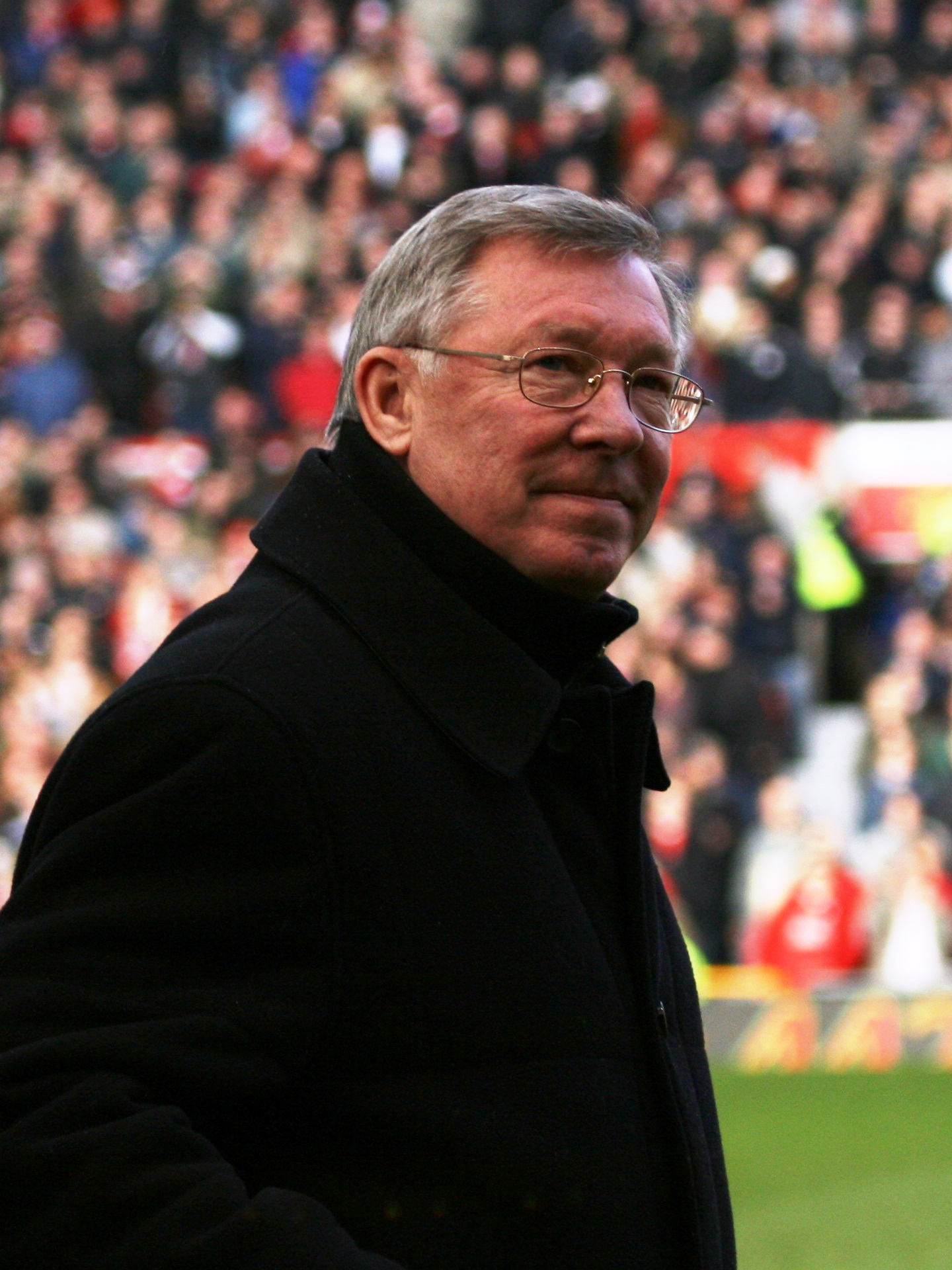
Sir Alex Ferguson, the most decorated manager in the history of Manchester United

Manchester United Football Club is a professional football club based in Old Trafford, Greater Manchester, England. The club was formed in Newton Heath in 1878 as Newton Heath LYR F.C., and played their first competitive match in October 1886, in the first round of the 1886–87 FA Cup. The club was renamed Manchester United F.C. in 1902, and moved to Old Trafford in 1910.

From the beginning of the club's official managerial records in 1892 to the 2025–26 season, Manchester United have had 26 full-time managers. The current head coach is Mauricio Pochettino, who took over from head coach Michael Carrick after his dismissal in November 2026.

The longest-serving and most successful person to manage Manchester United is Sir Alex Ferguson, who won 13 Premier League titles, five FA Cups, four League Cups, 10 Community Shields, two UEFA Champions League titles, one UEFA Cup Winners' Cup, one UEFA Super Cup, one Intercontinental Cup and one FIFA Club World Cup during a managerial reign of more than 26 years.

== Managerial history ==
From 1878 to 1914, the team was selected by a committee whose secretary had the same powers and role as a manager has today. There were four secretaries during this period, A. H. Albut, James West, Ernest Mangnall and John Bentley.

Ernest Mangnall was the first man to bring any major silverware to the club, winning the club's first ever Football League title in 1908. This was followed by the inaugural FA Charity Shield and the club's first FA Cup the following season, and then another league title and Charity Shield in 1911. Despite this success, though, he left the club a year later to join local rivals Manchester City. Coincidentally, Mangnall's last match in charge of United was the Old Trafford derby of 7 September 1912. John Bentley took over as club secretary, but was replaced two years later by Jack Robson, who became the club's first full-time manager. He remained in the post for seven years, but resigned in December 1921 after succumbing to a bout of pneumonia.

Robson was followed soon after by John Chapman. However, in Chapman's first season at the club, they were relegated to the Second Division for the first time since 1906. Three years in the Second Division followed, before promotion back to the First Division. After guiding the club to 9th place in the league and the FA Cup semi-finals in 1925–26, Chapman received a telegram from the Football Association on 8 October 1926 informing him of his suspension from management for the rest of the season; no reason was given. Half-back Lal Hilditch took over for the remainder of the season, before Herbert Bamlett took permanent control.

Bamlett was manager for four years, but was unable to muster any success, the club's highest position during his reign being 12th. The club was relegated to the Second Division again in 1931, and Bamlett was replaced by club secretary Walter Crickmer. This was Crickmer's first of two spells as manager of the club, retaining his position as secretary all the while. It lasted only a season, though, as he failed to return the club to the First Division. In June 1932, Scott Duncan was appointed as manager, but in his second season in charge he led the club to what remains a club record lowest League position; 20th in the Second Division. The club held faith in Duncan though, and he managed to get the club back into the First Division by 1936. However, the club was relegated again the following year, and Walter Crickmer resumed control until the end of the Second World War.

Before the end of the war, the club approached Matt Busby, who had just turned down the opportunity to join the coaching staff at Liverpool, on the grounds that he wanted more responsibility over the playing side of the club than merely the selection of the team. United allowed Busby the responsibilities he requested, and in his first five seasons in charge he guided the team to four second-place finishes in the league, before finally winning his first title in 1952. He soon set about replacing many of the more experienced players with a group of youths who came to be known as the "Busby Babes". This team went on to win two league titles in 1955–56 and 1956–57, as well as the 1956 and 1957 Charity Shields and reaching two FA Cup finals. Unfortunately, the careers of many of the players were cut short by the Munich air disaster, which also left Busby fighting for his life.

While Busby was in hospital recovering from the injuries he sustained in the air crash, his managerial duties were left to his assistant, Jimmy Murphy. After Busby recovered, he set about rebuilding his side, and within five years, in 1963, he had won the FA Cup for the first time in 15 years. This was followed up by two league titles in three years, and then the greatest prize in European club football, the European Cup. He continued as manager for one more year after this success, leaving his managerial duties to club trainer Wilf McGuinness. McGuinness struggled in his new post, however, and Busby was convinced to return for the second half of the 1970–71 season. However, he retired from football permanently that summer, and was succeeded that summer by Frank O'Farrell. O'Farrell's stay was short-lived, though, as his inability to control George Best's extravagances forced the board to sack him with three years still to run on his contract.

O'Farrell's replacement was to be Scotland coach, Tommy Docherty. Docherty left the Scotland job and his first task at United was to keep the club in the top flight. He managed it once, but he was unable to pull it off again and the club was relegated in 1973–74. They bounced straight back up the following season, though, and in their first season back in the top flight, the team cruised to a third-place finish and yet another FA Cup final. The next year, they went one better, beating Liverpool in the final to claim his first and only trophy at Old Trafford. It was soon discovered, however, that Docherty was having an affair with the wife of the club's physiotherapist, and he was immediately fired, replaced by Queens Park Rangers' manager Dave Sexton.

Sexton remained in the United job for four years, before he was replaced in 1981 by Ron Atkinson. Atkinson was able to rekindle the club's cup success, leading his side to two FA Cups in his five-year tenure. He also oversaw a series of respectable finishes in the league, but after his disastrous start to the 1986–87 season, he was sacked. His replacement, Alex Ferguson, had, in recent years, become the first manager to break the dominance of Rangers and Celtic in the Scottish league, winning the Scottish Premier Division title with Aberdeen three times in six years, as well as finishing as runner-up twice and winning the European Cup Winners' Cup against Real Madrid in 1983.

During his tenure, Ferguson was credited with the distinction of making some of the most shrewd purchases in the club's history, including the signings of Peter Schmeichel and Eric Cantona, each for less than £1.5 million. With these types of signings, combined with the club's many experienced players, Ferguson won the FA Cup in 1990, his first trophy at the club. The next season, he brought home the club's first European trophy in 23 years, the European Cup Winners' Cup, followed by the club's first ever League Cup in 1992. The year after, Ferguson won United their first league title in 26 years. Over the following decade, Ferguson would go on to win the Premier League title another six times, including a hat-trick of titles from 1999 to 2001. In 1999, he led Manchester United to an unprecedented Treble of the Premier League, FA Cup and UEFA Champions League. Subsequently knighted, Sir Alex was set to retire in 2002 but stayed on with the club. He won his 10th Premier League title in the 2007–08 season, and followed this up with his second Champions League title 10 days later. In 2008–09, Ferguson guided United to another Premier League title, making Manchester United the only club and him the only manager to have won the English league title three times in a row twice. His 12th title, in the 2010–11 season, was United's 19th overall, overtaking Liverpool's record of 18. Ferguson won his 13th and final league title in the 2012–13 season, making it 20 titles overall for United. Near the end of the season, Ferguson announced his retirement, and he was replaced by Everton manager David Moyes. He retired as the most decorated manager in football history.

In his first match, Moyes won United their 20th Community Shield and his first trophy as United manager; however, after failing to lead the club to Champions League qualification, he was sacked before the end of his first season, with Ryan Giggs taking temporary charge for the final four games of the 2013–14 season where the club finished seventh, their lowest league finish since the establishment of the Premier League. Netherlands manager Louis van Gaal was appointed as Moyes' permanent replacement on 19 May 2014, taking charge after the end of the 2014 FIFA World Cup. In his inaugural season, United signed many prominent players and returned to the Champions League with a fourth-place finish. In his second season, United finished in fifth place behind Manchester City, out of the Champions League positions, but won the 2015–16 FA Cup, the club's first in a dozen years. The board, however, decided that not enough progress had been made from the previous season and Van Gaal was sacked on 23 May 2016, just two days after lifting the cup. He was replaced by two-time European champion and two-time Chelsea boss José Mourinho four days later. Mourinho became United's fourth manager (including Giggs) in as many years since Ferguson's retirement. He won the Community Shield, League Cup and Europa League in his first season – the Europa League being the first in the club's history, making United the fifth team to win all of the main European club competitions. However, Mourinho failed to win any silverware in 2017–18 as United finished second in both the league and FA Cup. He was sacked on 18 December 2018 after the team won just seven of their opening 17 matches of the 2018–19 season. Former United forward Ole Gunnar Solskjær was appointed as caretaker manager for the rest of the season. On 19 January 2019, Solskjær won his seventh out of seven games in charge of United, a new club record, and on 28 March 2019, following victory over Paris Saint-Germain in the Champions League, Solskjær was given the job permanently. He became the first former United player to manage the club permanently since Wilf McGuinness. On 21 November 2021, Solskjær left his post as the first full-time manager since Frank O'Farrell, and like McGuinness, to not win a trophy for United. He was replaced by first-team coach Michael Carrick on a caretaking basis until 2 December 2021. German Ralf Rangnick was appointed interim manager until the end of the season.

On 21 April 2022, Erik ten Hag was announced as the new full-time manager. On 26 February 2023, he successfully brought United their first competitive trophy in nearly six years as they won the EFL Cup final against Newcastle United. The following season, Ten Hag took United to the FA Cup final, where they defeated Manchester City 2–1 to make it successive seasons of silverware. In October 2024, Ten Hag was sacked after the club managed just three wins in their first nine league matches, leaving them in 14th place in the Premier League. Former United striker and one of Ten Hag's assistants Ruud van Nistelrooy took interim charge for the following four matches before the appointment of Ruben Amorim on 11 November as head coach. Amorim lasted less than 14 months before being replaced by Darren Fletcher as caretaker head coach and subsequently by Michael Carrick for the remainder of the 2025–26 season. Carrick was appointed full-time head coach in May 2026 on a two year deal, however following a poor start to the 2026–27 season Carrick was sacked in November 2026 and was replaced by Mauricio Pochettino.

== Statistics ==
Information correct as of 12 November 2026. Only competitive matches are counted.

Table headers

- Nationality – If the manager played international football as a player, the country/countries he played for are shown. Otherwise, the manager's nationality is given as their country of birth.
- From – The year of the manager's first match for Manchester United.
- To – The year of the manager's last match for Manchester United.
- M – The number of matches managed for Manchester United.
- W – The number of matches won as a manager.
- D – The number of matches drawn as a manager.
- L – The number of matches lost as a manager.
- GF – The number of goals scored under his management.
- GA – The number of goals conceded under his management.
- Win% – The total winning percentage under his management.
- Honours – The trophies won while managing Manchester United.

Key

- (n/a) = Information not available
- ^{p} = Player-manager

List of Manchester United F.C. managers
Image	Manager	Nationality	From	To	M	W	D	L	GF	GA	Win% (Note: Win% is rounded to two decimal places)	Honours	Notes
	A. H. Albut	England	1889	26 May 1900	351	156	59	136	692	594	44.44		(Note: Secretary of the committee that chose the team) (Note: Information regarding A. H. Albut's managerial record is unavailable due to his exact date of appointment being unknown.)
	James West	England	27 May 1900	September 1903	113	46	20	47	159	147	40.71		
	Ernest Mangnall	England	10 October 1903	9 September 1912	373	202	76	95	700	476	54.16	2 First Division titles 1 FA Cup; 2 Charity Shields	
	T. J. Wallworth	England	9 September 1912	20 October 1912	6	3	2	1	11	7	50.00		(Note: Wallworth was only the club's acting secretary, and, as such, he is not included in any official lists of the club's managers.)
	John Bentley	England	28 October 1912	28 December 1914	82	36	16	30	127	110	43.90		
	Jack Robson	England	28 December 1914	31 October 1921	139	41	42	56	183	207	29.50		
	John Chapman	Scotland	31 October 1921	8 October 1926	221	86	58	77	287	274	38.91		
	Lal Hilditch^{p}	England	8 October 1926	13 April 1927	33	10	10	13	38	47	30.30		
	Herbert Bamlett	England	13 April 1927	9 November 1931	183	57	42	84	280	374	31.15		
	Walter Crickmer	England	9 November 1931	13 July 1932	43	17	8	18	72	76	39.53		
	Scott Duncan	Scotland	13 July 1932	7 November 1937	235	92	53	90	371	362	39.15	1 Second Division title	
	Walter Crickmer	England	9 November 1937	15 February 1945	76	30	24	22	131	112	39.47		
	Matt Busby	Scotland	1 October 1945	4 June 1969	1,120	565	263	292	2,286	1,536	50.45	5 First Division titles 2 FA Cups; 5 Charity Shields (inc. 2 shared); 1 European Cup	
	Jimmy Murphy (caretaker)	Wales	February 1958	June 1958	22	5	7	10	27	42	22.73		(Note: Murphy was installed as the club's caretaker manager while Busby was in hospital recovering from the Munich air disaster.)
	Wilf McGuinness	England	4 June 1969	29 December 1970	87	32	32	23	127	111	36.78		
	Matt Busby (interim)	Scotland	29 December 1970	8 June 1971	21	11	3	7	38	30	52.38		
	Frank O'Farrell	Ireland	8 June 1971	19 December 1972	81	30	24	27	115	111	37.04		
	Tommy Docherty	Scotland	22 December 1972	4 July 1977	228	107	56	65	333	252	46.93	1 FA Cup; 1 Second Division title	
	Dave Sexton	England	14 July 1977	30 April 1981	201	81	64	56	290	240	40.30	1 Charity Shield (shared)	
	Ron Atkinson	England	9 June 1981	6 November 1986	292	146	79	67	461	266	50.00	2 FA Cups; 1 Charity Shield	
	Alex Ferguson	Scotland	6 November 1986	19 May 2013	1,500	895	338	267	2,769	1,365	59.67	13 Premier League titles 5 FA Cups; 4 League Cups; 10 Community Shields (inc. 1 shared) (Note: Five of Ferguson's Community Shields were won while the competition was still known as the FA Charity Shield.); 2 UEFA Champions Leagues; 1 European Cup Winners' Cup; 1 European Super Cup; 1 Intercontinental Cup; 1 FIFA Club World Cup	
	David Moyes	Scotland	1 July 2013	22 April 2014	51	27	9	15	86	54	52.94	1 Community Shield	
	Ryan Giggs^{p} (caretaker)	Wales	22 April 2014	11 May 2014	4	2	1	1	8	3	50.00		
	Louis van Gaal	Netherlands	16 July 2014	23 May 2016	103	54	25	24	158	98	52.43	1 FA Cup	
	José Mourinho	Portugal	27 May 2016	18 December 2018	144	84	32	28	244	121	58.33	1 UEFA Europa League; 1 League Cup; 1 Community Shield	
	Ole Gunnar Solskjær	Norway	19 December 2018 (Note: Solskjær served as interim manager until 28 March 2019, when he was hired on a permanent basis.)	21 November 2021	168	91	37	40	323	165	54.17		
	Michael Carrick (caretaker)	England	21 November 2021	2 December 2021	3	2	1	0	6	3	66.67		
	Ralf Rangnick (interim)	Germany	3 December 2021	22 May 2022	29	11	10	8	37	37	37.93		
	Erik ten Hag	Netherlands	23 May 2022	28 October 2024	128	70	23	35	217	165	54.69	1 FA Cup; 1 League Cup	
	Ruud van Nistelrooy (caretaker)	Netherlands	28 October 2024	10 November 2024	4	3	1	0	11	3	75.00		
	Ruben Amorim	Portugal	11 November 2024	5 January 2026	63	24	18	21	103	95	38.10		Appointed head coach.
	Darren Fletcher (caretaker)	Scotland	5 January 2026	13 January 2026	2	0	1	1	3	4	0.00		
	Michael Carrick	England	13 January 2026 (Note: Carrick served as interim manager until 22 May 2026, when he was hired on a permanent basis.)	12 November 2026	32	15	8	9	54	46	46.88		Appointed head coach.
	Mauricio Pochettino	Argentina	18 November 2026	Current	0	0	0	0	0	0	—		Appointed head coach.
