= Jim Hart (baseball manager) =

American baseball executive and manager

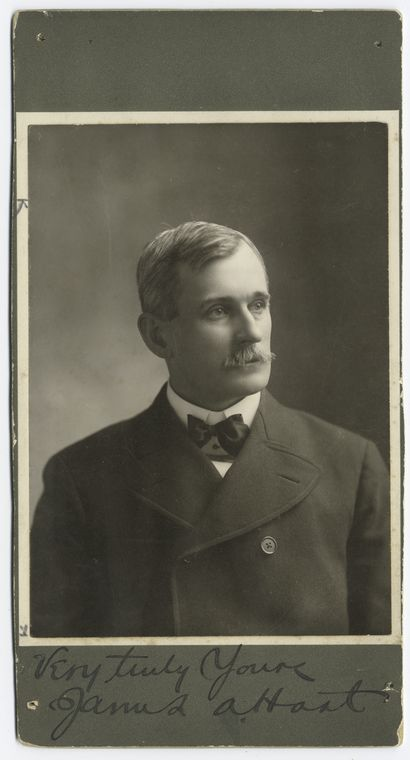
- Manager / Executive
- Born: July 10, 1855; Fairview, Pennsylvania, U.S.
- Died: July 18, 1919 (aged 64); Chicago, Illinois, U.S.
- Batted: Unknown Threw: Unknown

MLB debut
- April 19, 1885, for the Louisville Colonels

Last MLB appearance
- October 5, 1889, for the Boston Beaneaters

MLB statistics
- Games managed: 383
- Win–loss record: 202–174
- Winning %: .537
- Managerial record at Baseball Reference

Teams
- Louisville Colonels (1885–1886); Boston Beaneaters (1889)

James Abner Hart (July 10, 1855 – July 18, 1919) was an American professional baseball manager in the late 19th century. Some later sources identify Hart’s middle name as “Aristotle.” In the major leagues of the era, he managed the Louisville Colonels and the Boston Beaneaters for parts of three seasons. During the 1890s, he managed baseball teams in the United Kingdom.

== U.S. career ==
In 1885 and 1886, Hart managed the Louisville Colonels of the major-league American Association. He then served as manager of the minor-league Milwaukee Brewers in 1887 and 1888. In 1889, Hart managed the Boston Beaneaters of the National League. Hart was the first Boston manager to not have played for the team.

In 1891, Hart, who was secretary of the Chicago White Stockings (later the Chicago Colts and then the Chicago Cubs), succeeded Albert Spalding as president of the team. Hart was part-owner of the Colts team, and in the 1895 season, the entire Colts team was arrested for creating a disturbance on a Sunday, after which Hart bailed every player out.

== U.K. career ==
Hart went to the U.K. in the 1890s. The professional National League of Baseball of Great Britain was started in 1890. A letter was sent to Albert Spalding in America requesting help in establishing a league. The British requested eight to ten players to coach and convert the existing players, whose primary game was usually soccer. Spalding sent Hart as a skilled manager along with several players: William J. Barr, Charles Bartlett, J. E. Prior and Leech Maskrey.

The original intention had been to have eight teams, but initially there were just four: Aston Villa, Preston North End Baseball Club, Stoke City and Derby Baseball Club. The first three used Jim Hart to decide the line-up of their teams, while Francis Ley at Derby made his own decisions. Hart was a director of Preston North End Baseball Club Limited.

== Proposed innovation ==
An 1894 newspaper article reveals a proposal by Hart - the addition on numbers to the backs of player uniforms for identification by fans, with scorecards being printed with player names matching the numbers. (See also Uniform number (Major League Baseball)) This proposal would not be implemented in the Major Leagues on a permanent basis, however, until 1929.
