= Preston North End Baseball Club =

Short lived English professional baseball club

Information
- League: National League
- Location: Preston, United Kingdom
- Ballpark: Deepdale
- Founded: 1890
- Folded: 1892
- President: 'Sir' John Woods

Preston North End Baseball Club were a short lived English professional baseball club, who played their home games at Deepdale, competing for the 1890 National League of Baseball of Great Britain. Preston North End Baseball Club Limited were formally established on 21 June 1890, with £2,000 in £10 shares, with the Directors being Thomas Slaney, William Sudell, J. Brown (both of Preston North End), Morton Betts, Jim Hart and Newton Crane, and were registered by Richard Barnes.

== Ballpark ==
Due to being owned by the president of Preston North End and playing games during summer, when football was not played, the baseball club were able to use Deepdale Stadium.

== 1890 National League of Baseball of Great Britain ==
Preston hosted Derby Baseball Club on 21 June 1890, the first baseball game to be played at Deepdale, with Derby winning 6–9. A crowd estimated to be either 300 or 500 spectators cheered on Preston in their second game, versus Aston Villa at Perry Barr Stadium, Birmingham. It was noted that this crowd was nearly three times larger than the opening day attendance. Interestingly, it was reported that "it was openly whispered around the field on Saturday that Mr. Fancis Ley, the presiding deity of the Derby baseball club had promised the Deepdale players so much a man in the event of taking down the Brums". This is telling, as the league ended acrimoniously, amid accusations of cheating. Things remained unsettled for Preston in the early weeks of the championship, when some of the players, who had been paid to practice since May, reportedly refused to sign professional terms for the club.

In August Preston travelled with Aston Villa to put on an exhibition game at Cathkin Park in Glasgow. At this point the captain of Preston, Leech Maskrey returned to his native United States, having been presented with a gold watch chain and fob by his teammates. In November 'Sir' John Woods, Chairman of both Preston North End and Preston North End Baseball Club visited Philadelphia, and made comments to the Philadelphia Inquirer regarding the success of baseball in Britain, comments which were subsequently picked up and printed by the local press in Preston. Woods appears to have claimed that his baseball club had won the national championship and that his football were the "champion association football club of the world"! Woods went on to praise his long time partner in organising sports in Preston, William Sudell, for his efforts in establishing baseball in England, stating that Spalding had personally come to Preston North End to ask for Sudell and Woods to take on the responsibility for creating a national baseball championship. Financially the season had been a success, with Preston charging spectators a 3d. admission fee per game, and "their expenses were nothing like that amount".

=== Professional roster ===
- H. Brown – Right field (also was an umpire for some games of the championship)
- J. Brown – Pitcher
- ? Colford – Short stop and right field
- Samuel Dobson – Centre field
- George Drummond – Right field
- ? Gillespie – Short stop, second base, right field and pitcher
- Billy Hendry – Second base and first base
- Billy Hogan – Right field, pitcher and short stop
- W. Livesey – Third base
- Leech Maskrey – Catcher (Also player-coach and captain)
- Moses Sanders – Left field
- William Stewart – Right field, first base and centre field
- James Trainer – First base

W. Livesey was a sprinter of some regional notoriety who played as a reserve for Preston North End, local rugby union and as a professional baseball player for Preston North End. He was killed in 1893.

J. Brown, Colford and Maskrey were all American professionals.

== 1890 Amateur Championship Baseball Cup winners ==
In August 1890 an amateur side was formed. On 29 September, at Perry Barr Stadium in Birmingham, the Preston amateur side met with their counterparts from Aston Villa. Preston scored an amazing 42 runs, which was said to be a British record. F. Brown, captain of the amateur side, was presented with the Amateur Championship Baseball Cup of Great Britain, the trophy was provided by Spalding and Co. and was put on display in Preston Town Hall.

=== Amateur roster ===
- F. Brown – Catcher
- W. Brown – Catcher
- Fred Dewhurst – Outfielder (unknown position)
- John Drummond – Second base
- J. Eastham – Right field
- Jack Gordon – Centre field
- Robert Holmes – Pitcher
- J. Healey – Left field
- Bob Howarth – Outfielder (unknown position)
- Bob Kelso – Short stop
- W. McKenna – Short stop
- Jimmy Ross – Third base
- Nick Ross – First base

== Post professionalism and demise ==
Preston North End were adamant that they were committed to professional baseball and would be fielding both professional and amateur teams in the 1891 season but by June 1891 the local press were bemoaning that there were no professional teams for Preston to play, and that Derby, who had been professional in 1890, were unwilling to play Preston without assurances the game wouldn't be "fixed". The conclusion was that the people of Preston should follow baseball organisers in Derby and establish a prominent local amateur community first, before attempting professionalism again. In any case the two clubs managed to arrange a four-game series, with Preston Secretary Mr Nuttall agreeing to two games at each stadium. Crowds of 700 then 1,000 attended the two games of the series hosted at Preston which suggests that locally in Preston baseball remained a viable professional sport. In May 1892 Preston took on a representative 'All England' team for 2,000 spectators at Belle Vue Stadium. Mr Lawson, President of an amateur New York Baseball Club was received in Preston by Suddell, who arranged for a baseball game to be played at Deepdale for his entertainment.

In October 'Sir' John Woods died at his home in Preston, aged just 42. Woods was a partner in the famous Preston tobacco manufacturers W.H. and J Woods and along with Sudell was one of the founders in athletic meetings in Preston, that led to the formation of Preston North End Preston North End, of whom he was still a Committee member at the time of his death. In their next game, versus Blackburn Rovers, the football club players wore black armbands and the flag on the main gate was flown at half mast. The baseball club then appears to have become fully defunct.

== Shelved plans for a revival ==
In August 1933 it was proposed that a new "first class" Preston Baseball Club be formed for the following year, and that it would apply to join the Lancashire Baseball League. A game under the code of the English Baseball Union was played at Preston on 26 August, to promote the sport ahead of this new club's formation. This match, and the endeavour to bring baseball back to Preston, was organised by J. Pickworth-Hutchinson. This exhibition game between a Preston team featuring no men from Preston took place at Farringdon Park, a Liverpool representative team were the opponents. It was hoped that, as in 1890, both sides would feature prominent footballers from their respective local Football League clubs, crowds of over 5,000 was expected. Pickworth-Hutchinson hoped that the rosters of the clubs in the new Lancashire League would once again be full of football stars, hoping to keep fit during the summer off-season.

== Honours ==
- Amateur Championship Baseball Cup:
  - 1890

== See also ==
- Baseball in the United Kingdom
- 1890 National League of Baseball of Great Britain
- Derby Baseball Club
