= Sim Bullas =

English baseball player (1863–1908)

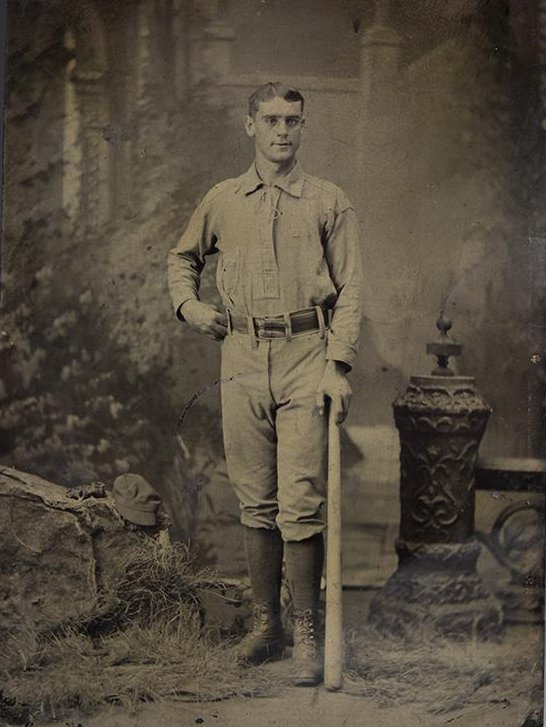
- Catcher
- Born: January 11, 1863; England
- Died: January 14, 1908 (aged 45); Cleveland, Ohio, United States
- Batted: Right Threw: Right

MLB debut
- May 2, 1884, for the Toledo Blue Stockings

Last MLB appearance
- June 23, 1884, for the Toledo Blue Stockings

MLB statistics
- At bats: 45
- RBI: 0
- Home runs: 0
- Batting average: .089
- Stats at Baseball Reference

Teams
- Toledo Blue Stockings (1884)

Simeon Edward Bullas (January 11, 1863 – January 14, 1908) was an English born professional baseball player who played catcher in the American Association for the 1884 Toledo Blue Stockings.

American newspapers state that Bullas was born in Cleveland, Ohio, on January 1, 1863 although Baseball Reference points to evidence that he was in fact born in Dudley, Staffordshire, England and emigrated to Cleveland, Ohio as a young child As a teenager, he won notice playing for the Malleables and the Shamrocks, two Cleveland amateur teams. He signed with a minor league team in Youngstown, Ohio, in 1883, and played for minor league teams in Oil City, Pennsylvania; Hamilton, Ontario; and Newcastle, Delaware. He made his major league debut with the Toledo Blue Stockings, but left after a year to play for the Chattanooga Lookouts.

Bullas left baseball in 1887 and began working in a foundry in Cleveland owned by British industrialist Francis Ley. In 1892, Ley sent Bullas to the United Kingdom to catch for the Derby Baseball Club, a professional baseball team in the National League of Baseball of Great Britain. After a single season there, he returned to Cleveland. In 1893, former professional baseball players in Cleveland organized a one-off team to play against other retired veterans in other cities. Bullas was loaned to the "old leaguers" team from Detroit, Michigan, who lacked a catcher.

From 1890 until his death, Bullas worked as a stagehand and ticket takers at the Euclid Avenue Opera House in Cleveland.

Sim Bullas died of pneumonia at his home in Cleveland on January 14, 1908. He was buried in Woodland Cemetery in Cleveland.
