= Deepdale =

English football stadium

Deepdale Stadium
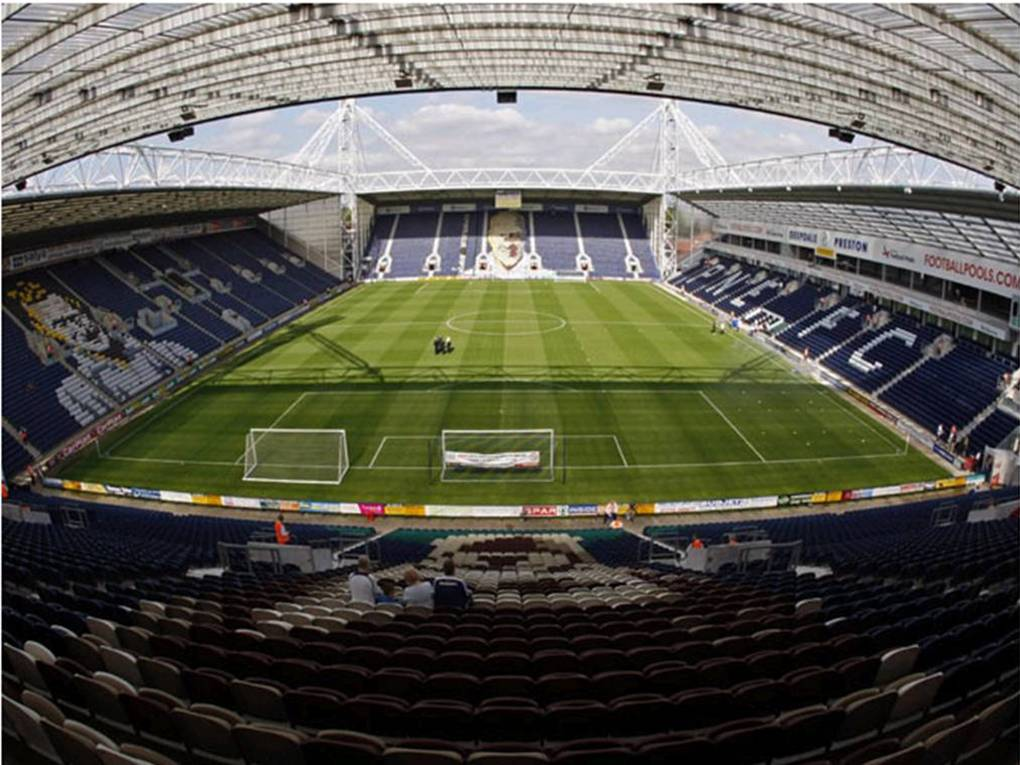
- UEFA

- Location in Preston
- Full name: Deepdale Stadium
- Location: Sir Tom Finney Way, Preston, Lancashire, PR1 6RU, England
- Coordinates: 53°46′20″N 2°41′17″W
- Owner: Preston North End F.C.
- Operator: Preston North End F.C.
- Capacity: 23,404
- Field size: 110 by 77 yards (101 m × 70 m)

Construction
- Built: 1875
- Opened: 1878 (for PNE)
- Renovated: 1995, 1998, 2001

Tenants
- Preston North End F.C. (1878–present); Lancashire Lynx (1996–2000)

Deepdale is a football stadium in the Deepdale area of Preston, England that is the home ground of Preston North End. Built in 1875 and in use since 1878, Deepdale is recognised as being one of the oldest continuously used football stadiums in the world, although the club's claim that it is the oldest is contested.

== History ==
The land on which the stadium stands was originally Deepdale Farm. It was leased on 21 January 1875 by the town's North End sports club and originally used for cricket and rugby. It hosted its first association football match on 5 October 1878. On 21 June 1890, Preston North End Baseball Club played the first professional baseball game at Deepdale, with Derby Baseball Club winning 9–6.

=== Old Deepdale ===
As football grew in popularity, it became necessary to have raised areas, so the idea of football terracing was formed. In the 1890s Preston built the West Paddock, which ran along the touch line and a tent was erected to house the changing rooms. By the turn of the century, crowds were regularly over 10,000 and in 1921 they had to expand again. The Spion Kop was built and the West Paddock was extended to meet the Kop end. The pitch was removed to allow the building of the Town End, which was completed in 1928 but was destroyed by fire only five years later and had to be rebuilt. The Pavilion Stand, a relatively small stand of two tiers holding the changing rooms and offices, was built and opened in 1934. The record league attendance for Preston North End at Deepdale is 42,684 v Arsenal in the First Division, 23 April 1938. The women's team Dick, Kerr Ladies also used to play at Deepdale, regularly attracting crowds of tens of thousands.

==== 1913 terrorist incident ====
An attempt was made to destroy the ground in 1913. As part of the suffragette bombing and arson campaign, suffragettes carried out a series of bombings and arson attacks nationwide to publicise their campaign for women's suffrage. In April 1913, suffragettes attempted to burn down Ewood Park's grandstand but were foiled. In the same year, suffragettes succeeded in burning down Arsenal's then South London stadium, and also attempted to burn down Blackburn Rovers' ground. More traditionally male sports were targeted in order to protest against male dominance.

=== Plastic pitch ===
In 1986, Preston North End decided to lay an all-weather pitch to try to generate some extra income for the club by renting the pitch to local teams to play on, to reduce the number of postponed matches as well as enabling the use of the Deepdale pitch as a training ground. It was one of four football stadiums in the English league to feature a plastic pitch, but this proved to be unpopular with the fans and was finally ripped up in 1994, by which time it was the last remaining plastic pitch in the English league.

=== Renovation ===
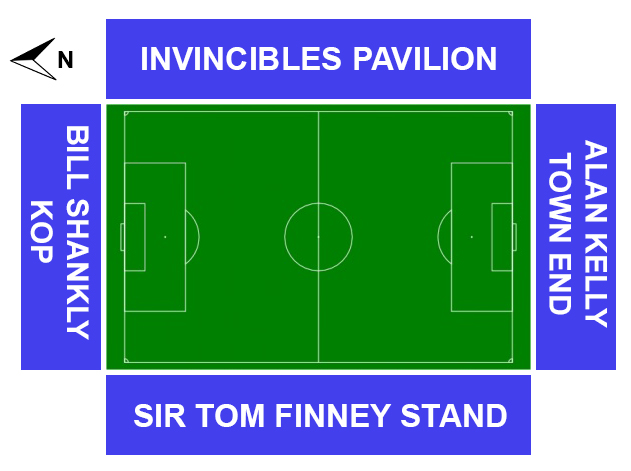
Deepdale layout

The original plans for the re-developed stadium were inspired by the Luigi Ferraris Stadium in Genoa, Italy. The regeneration of Deepdale began in 1995 when the old West Stand was demolished to make way for the new £4.4m Sir Tom Finney Stand which includes press areas and restaurants. The next stand to be developed was the Bill Shankly (1913–1981) Kop in 1998, followed by the Alan Kelly (1936–2009) Town End in 2001, which replaced the popular Town End terrace. In 2008, a 25-metre screen was also erected on the roof of the Bill Shankly Kop.

The old 'Pavilion' stand, was replaced by the 'Invincibles Pavilion' for the 2008–09 season, named after the Preston North End team of the 1888–89 season who were the first League champions, the first team to complete the League and FA Cup Double, and the only English team to complete a season unbeaten in both League and Cup. The Invincibles Pavilion includes a row of executive boxes and a restaurant which overlooks the pitch as well as the Stadium Control Room, PA Box and Big Screen Control Room and an NHS walk-in centre has also been built into the stand.

Deepdale is now an all-seater stadium with a total capacity of 23,404, as follows:

- Sir Tom Finney Stand: 7,893
- Bill Shankly Kop: 5,933
- Alan Kelly Town End: 5,859
- Invincibles Pavilion: 3,719

== Away end ==
At Deepdale, the area designated for visiting supporters is in the Bill Shankly Kop, a stand located behind one of the goals at the north end of the stadium. The stand has a steep incline and provides clear views of the pitch, helping create an engaging atmosphere for travelling fans.

Ticket allocations for away supporters typically range around **3,000 seats**, but for matches with a larger travelling following the full stand can be assigned, offering up to **6,000** places. Facilities in the away end include turnstiles dedicated to visiting fans, access to refreshments and concourse toilets, and an away ticket office open before kick‑off for collections and sales.

The allocation and matchday arrangements are managed in coordination with the visiting club and local safety authorities, and away supporters are reminded of stadium regulations regarding behaviour, banners, and prohibited items.

== Sir Tom Finney statue ==
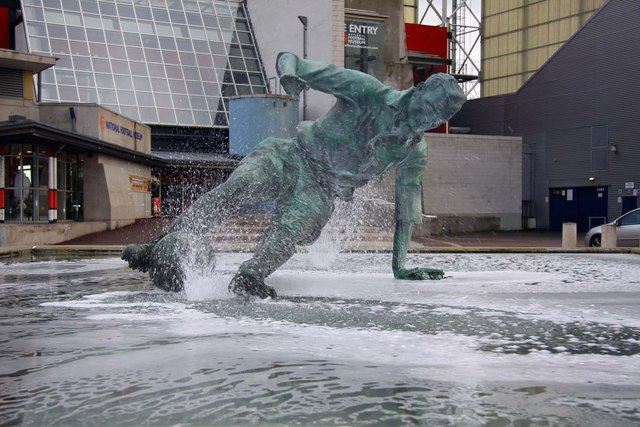
The Splash, statue of Sir Tom Finney (1922–2014)

Outside the Sir Tom Finney Stand, is a statue of the famous player himself, sculpted by Preston-born sculptor Peter Hodgkinson. The statue, commissioned for Finney's 80th birthday and unveiled in July 2004, was inspired by a photo taken at the Chelsea versus PNE game played at Stamford Bridge, in 1956.

The game was in 1956. There had been a big downpour just before the kick off. The match would not have been played today because there were huge pools of water on the playing surface. I was going past a defender and the ball ran in to a pool of water. It was a fantastic photograph and it won the Sports Photograph of the Year award. The sculpture is a true likeness.

— Sir Tom Finney

== International use ==
Deepdale was used during the 2005 UEFA Women's Championship for three group games and a semi-final, for an England Under-21s game against Iceland in March 2011, and two England Under-19s Elite Qualifying Round matches against Slovenia and Switzerland in the 2011–12 season.

== National Football Museum ==
Between 2001 and 2010 the National Football Museum was located in the Bill Shankly Kop stand at Deepdale. The project, started in 1995, was part funded by a National Lottery Heritage grant. Including items such as the match ball from the 1966 World Cup Final and a cap from the world's first ever football international, the museum attracted around 100,000 visitors a year. A proposal to move to Wembley Stadium in 2008 was resisted, but the removal of external funding lead to the museum's relocation to Urbis in Manchester in 2010.

== See also ==
- List of stadiums in the United Kingdom by capacity
- Lists of stadiums
