= T. J. Wallworth =

English football manager and secretary

T. J. Wallworth (born in Bolton, Lancashire), was an English acting secretary of Manchester United from 9 September 1912 to 20 October 1912; the term "manager" was not used at Manchester United until the arrival of Jack Robson in 1914. Wallworth was made secretary following Ernest Mangnall's resignation in August 1912 and remained in the post until the appointment of John Bentley in October 1912.
