= Baseball Ground =

Former football stadium in Derby, England

- BBG
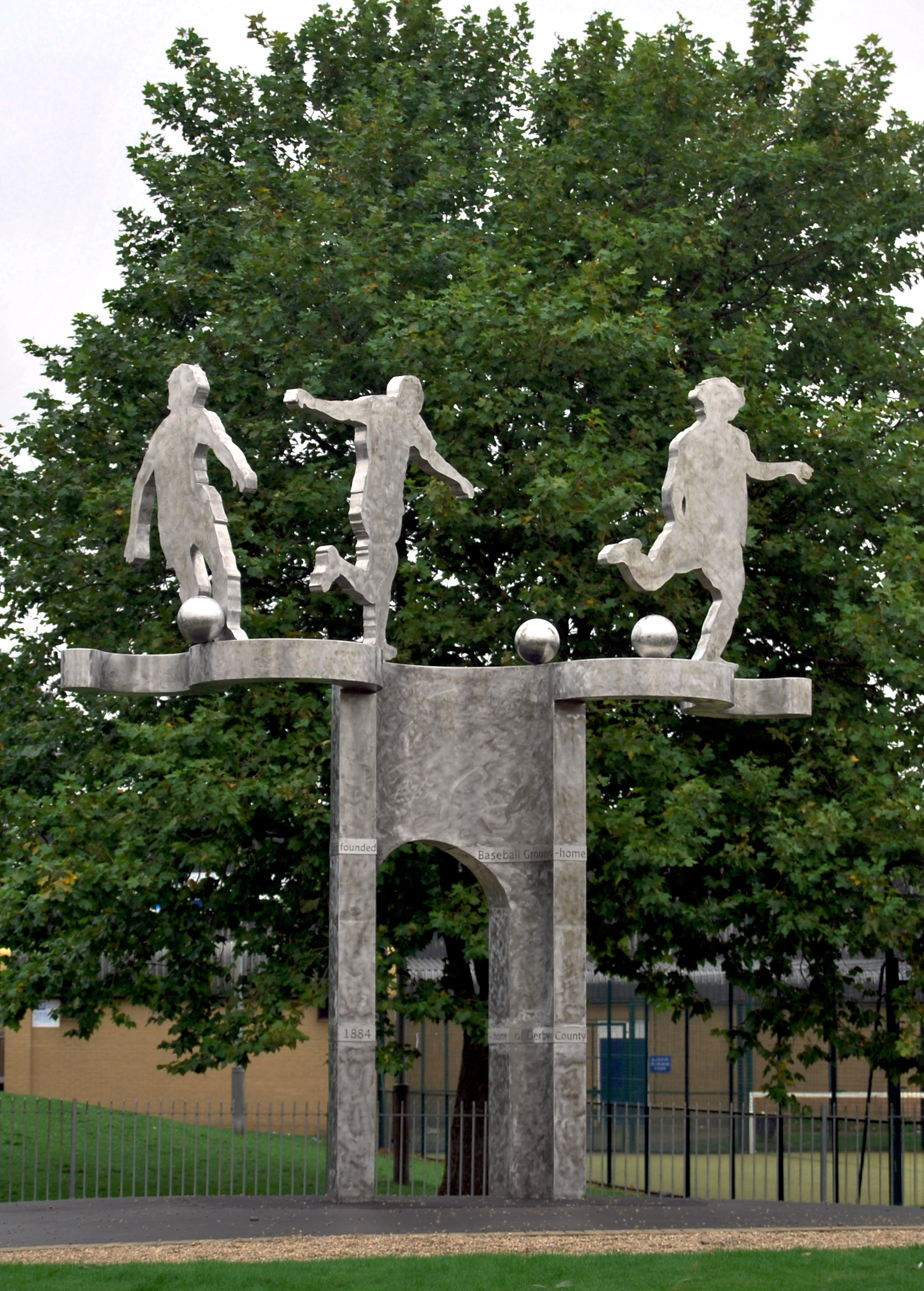
- Commemoration of the Baseball Ground
- Interactive map of Baseball Ground
- Former names: Ley's Baseball Ground (until c. 1895)
- Location: Derby
- Coordinates: 52°54′17″N 1°28′7″W
- Owner: Sir Francis Ley (until 1924); Derby County (from 1924)
- Operator: Ley's Malleable Castings Vulcan Ironworks (until 1896); Derby County (from 1896)
- Capacity: 4,000 (original capacity); 42,000 (highest capacity, 1969–1980); 18,300 (capacity at closure)
- Surface: Grass

Construction
- Groundbreaking: 1889
- Opened: 1890
- Closed: 2003
- Demolished: 2003–2004

Tenants
- Derby Baseball Club (1890–1898); Derby County (1895–1997); Derby County Reserves (1895–2003)

The Baseball Ground was a stadium in Derby, England, that was first used for baseball, as the home of Derby Baseball Club from 1890 until 1898, and then for football, as the home of Derby County from 1895 until 1997. The club's reserve and youth sides used it until 2003, when it finally closed as a sports stadium after 113 years (108 of them as a football stadium) and was demolished.

== History ==
As the name suggests, the stadium was originally used for baseball. It was originally called Ley's Baseball Ground and was part of a complex of sports grounds (Ley's Recreation Centre) built and owned by businessman Sir Francis Ley for workers at his foundry, Ley's Malleable Castings Vulcan Ironworks. The stadium was the focal point of the complex and was part of a personal quest by Ley to establish professional organised baseball in the United Kingdom. His Ley's Recreation Club was formed in 1890 and went on to become known as Derby Baseball Club, prior to being dissolved by Ley and replaced with a new Derby Baseball Club, all in 1890.

The Ground was bordered by Shaftesbury Crescent (west-northwest); Vulcan Street (south-southwest); the Ley foundry (east-southeast); and an extension of Cambridge Street (north-northeast) roughly corresponding to Columbo Street. The original stand was built along Vulcan, with standing-room areas along other edges of the field. The diamond was in roughly the southwest corner of the lot. Over the years, additional stands were built around the pitch and were tagged with names corresponding to their orientation with respect to the streets (Vulcan and Columbo) and nearby neighborhoods (Normanton and Osmaston).

The stadium was home to Derby Baseball Club, the baseball club was running away with the first British professional baseball championship, the National League which was established in 1890. However, pressure from other teams in the league over the number of American players Derby used forced them to resign before the end of the league's first season.

Derby County Football Club was formed in 1884, as an offshoot of the Derbyshire County Cricket Club. The football club played on a pitch that was part of the Derby cricket ground, which at that time was in the middle of a racecourse. This site, which had minimal facilities, was chosen to host five FA Cup semi-finals, the replay of the 1886 FA Cup Final and an England international match in 1895. Derby had occasionally used Ley's Baseball Ground for their home matches due to horse racing meetings taking priority. With the baseball club in decline, Derby County made it their permanent home in 1895 and renamed it The Baseball Ground. A party of Gypsies were forced to move and legend has it that, before leaving, they put a curse on the ground, preventing Derby County winning the FA Cup. The ground became the property of the club in 1924 when it was purchased from Ley's heirs for £10,000. The Baseball Ground was once used for an international match: England beat Ireland 2–1 in a British Home Championship match on 11 February 1911.

At its height, the Baseball Ground could accommodate around 42,000 spectators. The record attendance was 41,826 for a match against Tottenham Hotspur in 1969, just after Derby County were promoted under the management of Brian Clough, at the beginning of the most successful era in the club's history. Clough guided Derby County to the league title in 1972 and his successor Dave Mackay oversaw another title triumph in 1975.

However, attendances fell at the turn of the 1980s as Derby were relegated from the First Division in 1980, and in 1984 they fell into the Third Division, though an upswing in form followed and they were back in the First Division by 1987. Perimeter fencing was erected between the stands and the pitch during the 1970s to combat pitch invasions by hooligans, but this was dismantled in April 1989, within days of the Hillsborough disaster in which 97 Liverpool fans were fatally injured, most of them crushed to death against perimeter fencing. This resulted in policing levels in games at the Baseball Ground being increased by 50%.

=== Closure ===
Derby County remained at the stadium until 1997, when they moved to Pride Park. The site had first been identified in August 1993, although difficulties with decontaminating the land led to the project being abandoned within 18 months in favour of rebuilding the Baseball Ground into a 26,000-seat stadium. In the meantime, the Baseball Ground had been gradually converted into an all-seater stadium, although its capacity was reduced to just over 18,000 - inadequate for a second-tier club with ambitions of winning promotion back to the top flight.

However, these plans were abandoned in February 1996 and Pride Park was confirmed as the location for a new stadium. Construction work began later in 1996, with the new stadium scheduled to be ready in time for the 1997–98 season. It was, however, confirmed that the Baseball Ground would be retained for reserve and youth team matches for at least a few years after the new stadium's completion. Construction of the new stadium began later that year.

The last league match to be played there was a Premier League fixture against Arsenal (where 18,287 people watched Derby lose 3–1, although their top flight status was secured one season after promotion), though the stadium continued to be used for reserve team games for a few seasons afterwards.

In late 2003, several months after the youth team played its final game there, the Baseball Ground was finally demolished to make way for housing. The former ground has since been redeveloped to around 150 new homes and, in September 2010 a commemorative statue was unveiled on the site. The 15 feet (4.6 m) high metalwork featuring the silhouettes of three footballers dribbling and shooting was commissioned by the builders Spirita and Strata and designed by artist Denis O'Connor. A fan, George Glover, 'made history' by scoring the last goal at the Baseball Ground in a game between fans.

== Structure and facilities ==
After the Taylor Report was published, the stadium was slowly converted to become all-seater from terracing. Consequently, its capacity dropped to 17,451 in the 1995–96 season. This was inadequate for the ambitions of Derby County, who were chasing promotion to the Premier League during the early to mid-1990s, finally achieving it as Division One runners-up in 1996. The stadium featured two 3-tier stands at either end, both with the lowest tier not facing completely straight towards the pitch (due to the previous configuration for baseball) giving a wedge-like appearance at one end. Also, in one corner was a unique stand that was more house-like, mainly for media use.

== Transport ==
In 1990, a halt was built to serve the stadium called Ramsline Halt, although only four trains ever stopped there.
