= Francis Ley =

English industrialist (1846–1916)

Sir Francis Ley Bt.
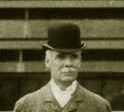
- from a photo with his Baseball team
- Born: 3 January 1846; Winshill, Derbyshire
- Died: 17 January 1916 (aged 70); Epperstone
- Education: Burton Grammar School and privately
- Occupation: Businessman
- Spouses: Georgina Townsend; Alison Catherine Jobson
- Children: five
- Parent(s): George and Sarah Ley

Sir Francis Ley, 1st Baronet (3 January 1846 – 27 January 1916) was an English industrialist. He founded Ley's Malleable Castings Vulcan Ironworks in Derby. He (re-)introduced baseball into the United Kingdom town of Derby with the Ley's Recreation Club (later known as Derby Baseball Club) and owned Ley's Recreation Centre from 1890 to 1924, which was home to Derby County Football Club.

In 1905, Ley was created a Baronet, of Epperstone Manor and, in the same year, served as High Sheriff of Nottinghamshire.

== Biography ==
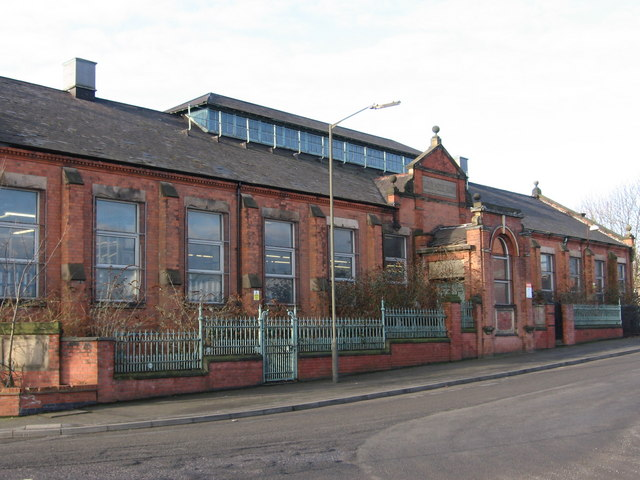
The mess room for Ley's Malleable Castings in Colombo Street, Derby

Francis Ley was born on 3 January 1846 in Winshill which at the time was in south-west Derbyshire (now in Staffordshire). He was the only son of George Phillips Ley and Sarah (born Potts). He started work at Andrew Handyside & Co. as a draughtsman and learnt about engineering. At the age of 28 he established a malleable iron castings foundry on Osmaston Road, Derby in 1874. The business became the Ley's Malleable Castings Company Ltd.

The Vulcan Iron Works at Osmaston Road occupied an 11-acre site by the Birmingham and Derby Junction Railway. In the London Gazette of 14 April 1876 Ley was granted a patent for "improvements in apparatus for locking and fastening nuts on fish plate and other bolts".

In 1878 he was sued for patent infringement by an American drive chain belt company; the case was settled and Ley's company was awarded sole manufacturing rights. By the 1880s Ley was demolishing his old works and rebuilding on a grander scale. The new factory was to include expensive sporting facilities. Ley was never sporting himself but he was an enthusiast for sport and sat on the board of Derbyshire County Cricket Club.

The Vulcan iron foundry was closed and demolished in 1986.

== Sport ==
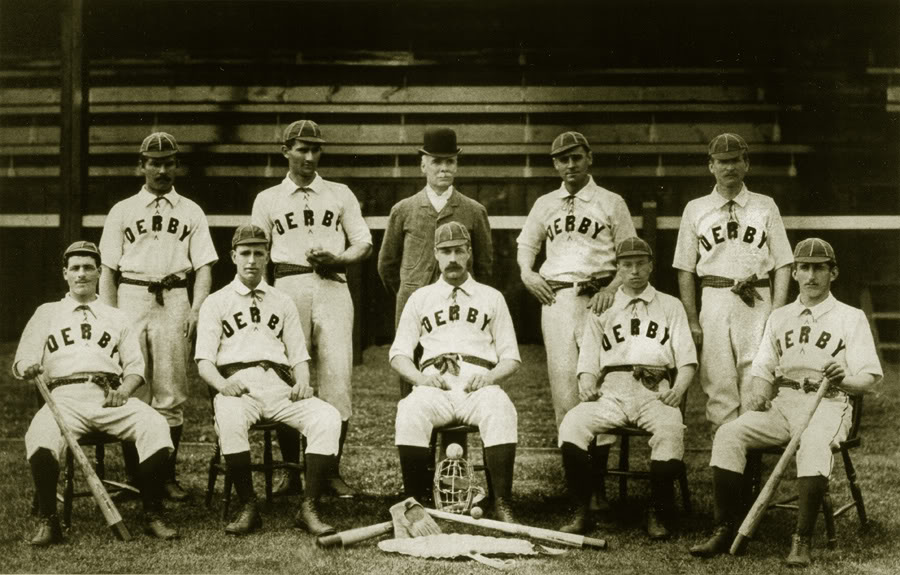
The 1890 Derby Baseball team with Francis Ley at centre.

Ley visited the United States of America in 1889, and was impressed by the game of baseball. Some people had been intrigued by Albert Spalding's world tour with his baseball team when it played in England in 1889. Ley decided that, as a way of ensuring a healthier and more productive workforce, an investment should be made in promoting recreation for his workers. During his journey to the States, Ley had seen the way in which baseball fields had been laid out by companies and factories for the use by their workers and decided to follow suit on his return to Derby. Consequently, Ley had what was to be called "Ley's Recreation Centre" built; a 12-acre (49,000 m^{2}) park for the use of workers with cricket and baseball facilities.

The National Baseball League of Great Britain and Ireland was started in 1890 and a letter was sent to Spalding in America requesting help in establishing a league. The British requested eight to ten players to coach and convert the existing players whose primary game was usually football. Spalding, who also sold sporting goods, was enthusiastic and sent a skilled manager, Jim Hart and players: William J. Barr, Charles Bartlett, J.E.Prior and Leech Maskrey.

The intention had been to have eight teams but initially there were just four Aston Villa, Preston North End, Stoke and Derby Baseball Club. The first three used Hart to decide the line-up of their teams, but Ley, who had more experience of baseball, made his own decisions. Derby ran away with the first professional championship; however, pressure from other teams in the league over the number of American professionals (three) on the team led to Derby withdrawing when they would have been the first British champions. Derby did win the amateur British title three times in the 1890s.

Derby County Football Club become tenants of Ley's grounds in 1895. Ley's Derby Baseball Club continued on, dominating baseball until 1900, at which point (at Ley's behest) local football clubs formed baseball clubs to join the league, including a Derby County Baseball Club. The Baseball Ground continued to be used under that name as the home of Derby County F.C. until 1997.

Ley's grounds were used for a variety of sports. A picture below shows Ley's 1912 cricket team. Remarkably it contains three players who were capped for England at football. These were S. Bloomer on the right of the back row, H. Barnes on the left but one of the middle row and J. Bagshaw who is first on the front row.

== Family ==
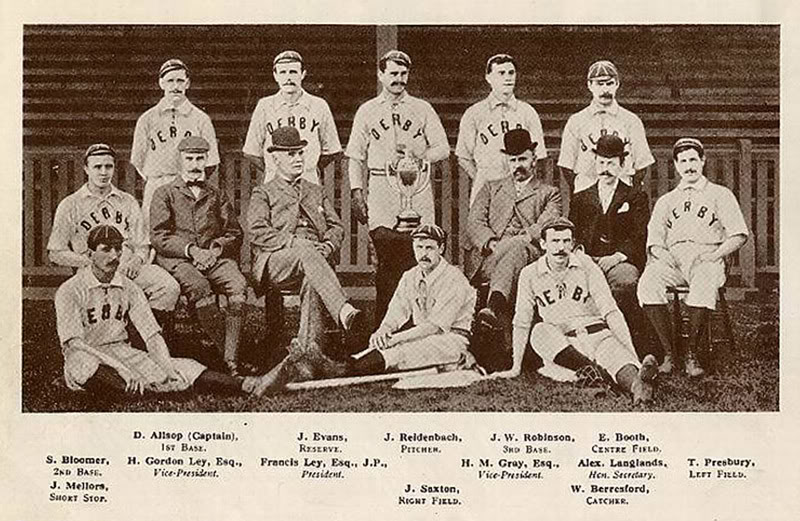
Another Derby Baseball Club team – which on the middle row from left includes Steve Bloomer, Ley's son, H. Gordon Ley and Ley himself

Ley first married Georgina Townsend and they had a son and two daughters. His first son, Henry Gordon Ley (1874–1944), is pictured left with his father. His daughter Ethel Ley (1873–1953) married in Epperstone on 16 December 1902 Henry John Boyd-Carpenter (1865–1923), a son of William Boyd Carpenter, Bishop of Ripon, and himself a colonial official in Egypt, where he was Chief Inspector to the Ministry of Public Instruction, then Inspector General of Schools.

Following his first wife's death he married Alison Catherine Jobson in 1888. They had two sons who both joined the Armed Forces. Christopher Francis Aden Ley was the elder, born in 1893. He joined the South Nottinghamshire Hussars and became a captain in the Royal Flying Corps. He died in March 1918 having survived the 1915 Gallipoli campaign and outlived his younger brother. Maurice Aden Ley was two years younger and a Lieutenant; he died in November 1914.

== Honours and legacy ==
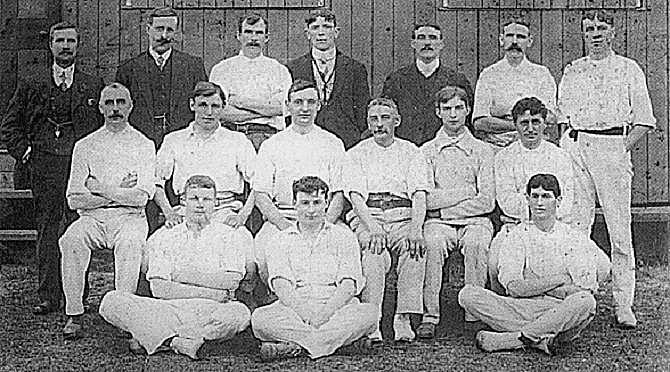
A 1912 Ley's Cricket team that includes three members of the England Football team

Ley bought Epperstone Manor in Nottinghamshire and he was created a Baronet, of Epperstone Manor, on 27 December 1905. Earlier the same year he was appointed High Sheriff of Nottinghamshire. When Ley died he owned the company and Derby County F.C.'s sports ground. He also owned 6,500 aces of farmland and was the Lord of the manor at Epperstone, Lazonby, Staffield, Glassonby around Kirkoswald in Cumbria. His Manor and grounds have been converted to residential dwellings, and there is an industrial estate named after him in Derby.

== Notes ==
Baronetage of the United Kingdom
New creation	Baronet (of Epperstone Manor); 1905–1916	Succeeded by Henry Gordon Ley
Honorary titles
Preceded by Thomas Lewis Kekewich Edge	High Sheriff of Nottinghamshire; 1905	Succeeded by Joseph Frederick Laycock
