= William McGregor (football) =

Scottish football administrator (1846–1911)

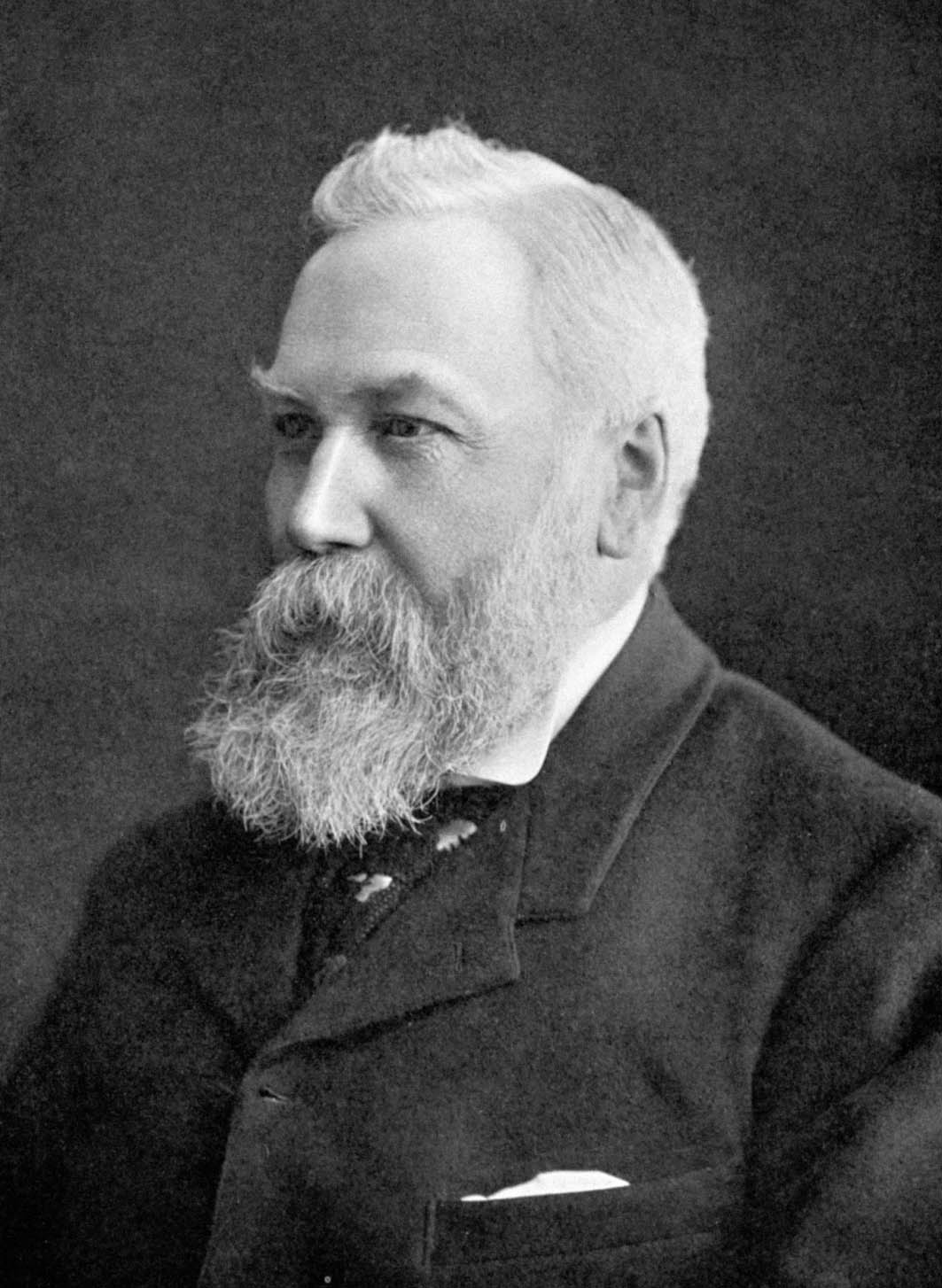
- Born: 13 April 1846; Braco, Perthshire, Scotland
- Died: 20 December 1911 (aged 65); Birmingham, England
- Occupations: Draper, director of Aston Villa
- Known for: Founder of The Football League
- Spouse: Jessie McGregor
- Children: 2

William McGregor (13 April 1846 – 20 December 1911) was a Scottish association football administrator in the Victorian era who was the founder of the Football League (now English Football League), the first organised association football league in the world.

After moving from Perthshire to Birmingham to set up business as a draper, McGregor became involved with local football club Aston Villa, which he helped to establish as one of the leading teams in England. He served the club for over 20 years in various capacities, including president, director and chairman. In 1888, frustrated by the regular cancellation of Villa's matches, McGregor organised a meeting of representatives of England's leading clubs, which led to the formation of the Football League, giving member clubs a guaranteed fixture list each season. This was instrumental in the transition of football from an amateur pastime to a professional business.

McGregor served as both chairman and president of the Football League and was also chairman of The Football Association (the FA). He was recognised by the FA for his service to the game shortly before his death in 1911, and was posthumously honoured by the local football authorities and Aston Villa.

== Personal life ==
Born in Braco in Perthshire, Scotland, McGregor first became interested in football after watching a match between locals and visiting artisans at Ardoch. He served an apprenticeship as a draper in Perth, and in 1870, following the example of his brother Peter, moved to Birmingham, and opened his own drapery business on the corner of Brearley Street and Summer Lane on the outskirts of the Jewellery Quarter. Upon his arrival in the English Midlands he became involved with a local football club, Calthorpe F.C., which had been formed by a fellow Scot, Campbell Orr. McGregor was enthusiastic enough about the game to arrange for his shop to close early on Saturdays to allow him to watch matches, and he later sold football kits at the shop, which became a popular meeting place for football enthusiasts.

McGregor was married to Jessie, and the couple had a daughter and a son, also named Jessie and William. When his wife died in 1908, they were living at 130 Birchfield Road, Handsworth. A teetotaller, McGregor was a supporter of the temperance movement, and was active in the local branch of the Liberal Party until his membership lapsed in 1882 due to the increasing amount of time he devoted to football. He was involved in the early attempts to establish a baseball league in the United Kingdom, and served as the honorary treasurer of the Baseball Association of Great Britain and Ireland.

Despite his commitment to sport, he continued his drapery business throughout his life. McGregor was a committed Christian who was widely respected for his honesty and integrity. He worshipped for forty years at the Congregational church in Wheeler Street, Aston. His pastor, the Revd. W.G. Percival said that the best thing about him "was not so much the genial, kindly, honest sportsman, but the Christian behind it all". He described him as "a man of absolutely unblemished personal character".

== Association with Aston Villa ==
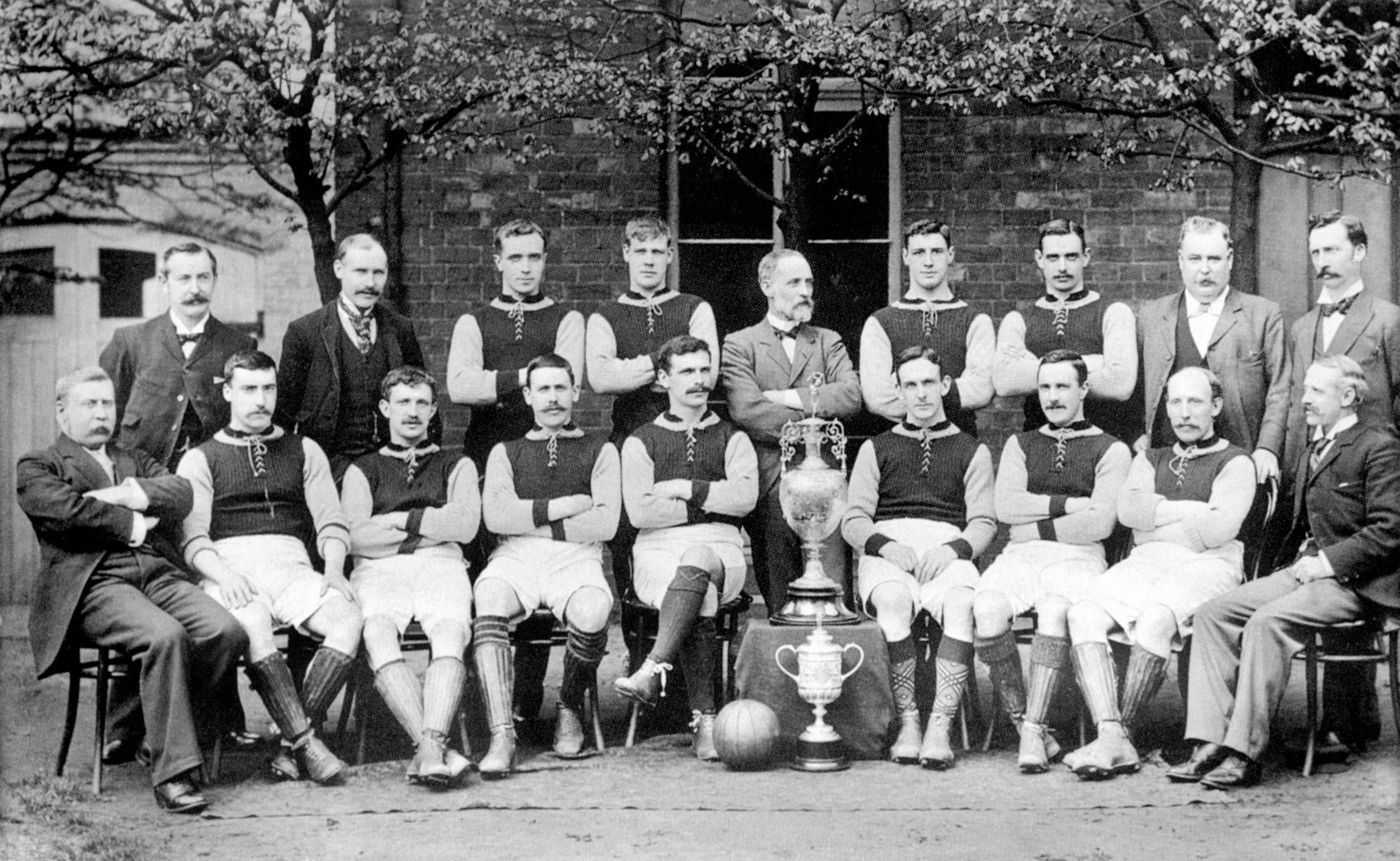
The Aston Villa team of 1896–97 with the First Division Championship and the FA Cup

In 1877, McGregor was invited to become a committee member of Aston Villa, a football club formed three years earlier. He also umpired matches for the club.^{[A]} At the time the club played at Aston Park, close to the premises of McGregor's business. He became interested in joining Villa due to the strong Scottish contingent in the club's ranks, the team's exciting style of play, and the club's connection to a Wesleyan Chapel. He quickly assumed the post of club administrator, helping the impecunious club to survive its financial troubles. After some of Aston Villa's possessions were seized by bailiffs, McGregor allowed the club to use his shop as a store to prevent further seizures. Under McGregor's leadership, Aston Villa won their first trophy, the Birmingham Senior Cup, in 1880, shortly after which McGregor became the club's president.

The following year McGregor became a member of the club's board of directors. Villa's standing within the game continued to grow, and, in 1887, the club became the first from the Midlands to win the FA Cup, defeating local rivals West Bromwich Albion in the final. In 1895, McGregor became vice-chairman, and went on to become the club's chairman in 1897. During his time at the club he was noted for his organisational skills and ambition, and was responsible for adopting the lion rampant depicted on the Royal Standard of Scotland, as the club's crest.

== Founder of the Football League ==
As the 1880s progressed, the balance of power within English football began to change. The first national competition, the FA Cup, had previously been dominated by amateur clubs from privileged backgrounds, such as Wanderers and Old Etonians. However the 1883 FA Cup Final saw the first victory by a working-class team, Blackburn Olympic. At this time professionalism was not permitted. Clubs from urban areas in the north were strong advocates of the practice, but the southern amateur teams and the FA authorities were firmly opposed. Though not initially an advocate of professionalism, McGregor came to favour its introduction. By 1885 the issue threatened to split the FA when a group of clubs, predominantly from Lancashire, announced their intention to leave and form a rival British Football Association if professionalism was not accepted. An emergency FA conference was called in response. Representing Aston Villa, McGregor spoke in favour of professionalism, the only delegate from the Midlands to do so, and was one of the few delegates to admit that his club had been paying players. Though not as outspoken as stronger proponents, such as Preston North End's William Sudell, McGregor was well respected. The conference ended with the FA accepting professionalism, although each club was permitted only to pay players who had been born or lived for at least two years within six miles of its home stadium.

Professionalism brought fresh complications for club administrators. Many friendlies were cancelled due to opponents' FA Cup or county cup matches taking precedence or clubs simply failing to honour a fixture in favour of a more lucrative match elsewhere. This made it hard for the clubs to pay players' wages on a regular basis. McGregor took action after seeing Villa matches cancelled, to the increasing frustration of the club's fans, on five consecutive Saturdays. On 2 March 1888, he wrote to the committee of his own club, Aston Villa, as well as to those of Blackburn Rovers, Bolton Wanderers, Preston North End and West Bromwich Albion, suggesting the creation of a league competition that would provide a number of guaranteed fixtures for its member clubs each season. Corinthian F.C. founder Nicholas Lane Jackson, writing in 1899, stated that McGregor took his inspiration from the existing league set-up used in American baseball, although McGregor himself cited the County Cricket Championship as his inspiration. McGregor's letter to the clubs read:

Every year it is becoming more and more difficult for football clubs of any standing to meet their friendly engagements and even arrange friendly matches. The consequence is that at the last moment, through cup-tie interference, clubs are compelled to take on teams who will not attract the public.

I beg to tender the following suggestion as a means of getting over the difficulty: that ten or twelve of the most prominent clubs in England combine to arrange home-and-away fixtures each season, the said fixtures to be arranged at a friendly conference about the same time as the International Conference.
This combination might be known as the Association Football Union, and could be managed by representative from each club. Of course, this is in no way to interfere with the National Association; even the suggested matches might be played under cup-tie rules. However, this is a detail.
My object in writing to you at present is merely to draw your attention to the subject, and to suggest a friendly conference to discuss the matter more fully. I would take it as a favour if you would kindly think the matter over, and make whatever suggestions you deem necessary. I am only writing to the following – Blackburn Rovers, Bolton Wanderers, Preston North End, West Bromwich Albion, and Aston Villa, and would like to hear what other clubs you would suggest.
I am, yours very truly, William McGregor (Aston Villa F.C.)

P.S. How would Friday, 23 March 1888, suit for the friendly conference at Anderton's Hotel, London?

McGregor chose 23 March as the date of his proposed meeting because it was the day before the FA Cup final and representatives of the country's top clubs would be in London. Representatives from ten clubs attended, including the FA Cup finalists West Bromwich Albion and Preston North End, but it quickly became clear that clubs from the South of England were not interested in McGregor's proposal and none attended. A second meeting was held in Manchester on 17 April, and details concerning the new competition were finalised. McGregor's suggested name for the competition, "The Association Football Union" was rejected as too similar to that of the Rugby Football Union and "The Football League" was chosen, despite McGregor's opposition on the grounds that he felt it might invoke associations with the unpopular Irish Land League. The term English League was avoided, to leave the possibility of future applications from Scottish clubs. McGregor also proposed a rule that only one club from each town should be included. The other founders agreed to this rule, which caused controversy, as it meant Birmingham team Mitchell St. George's were denied membership in favour of McGregor's Aston Villa. Twelve clubs kicked off the first season of League football in September 1888.

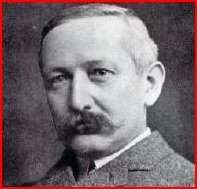
John Bentley, McGregor's successor as Football League president, criticised McGregor for his failure to attend many meetings during his later spell as League president.

McGregor served as the first chairman of the League's Management Committee. One of the committee's main jobs was handling issues of discipline, but committee members were not barred from involvement in decisions involving their own clubs. In fact, the first disciplinary meeting saw fines issued to three of the four clubs with representatives on the committee. McGregor was re-elected unopposed in 1891. Earlier he had spoken of his pleasure that "of the 132 matches in which the League clubs have taken part and in which about 300 players have taken the field, not a single fatal accident has to be recorded". A year later he oversaw the expansion of the Football League into two divisions when the rival Football Alliance was merged into the competition, but he relinquished his post later that year due to ill health, which caused him to miss meetings.

After stepping down as chairman, he was unanimously elected to an honorary position of president, a role he kept until 1894, and was named the first-ever life member of the League in 1895. The role was that of a figurehead with little actual authority, but he was used as a mediator to resolve league disagreements. In the second half of the decade McGregor's failure to attend many committee meetings led to criticism from John Bentley, his successor as president. Bentley's criticism achieved the desired effect; from 1899 until his health deteriorated in 1910, McGregor seldom missed a meeting. During this period McGregor was noted for his reserved nature. He was silent for large parts of committee meetings, but would contribute enthusiastically on the occasions he felt his input was necessary.

== Other football activities ==
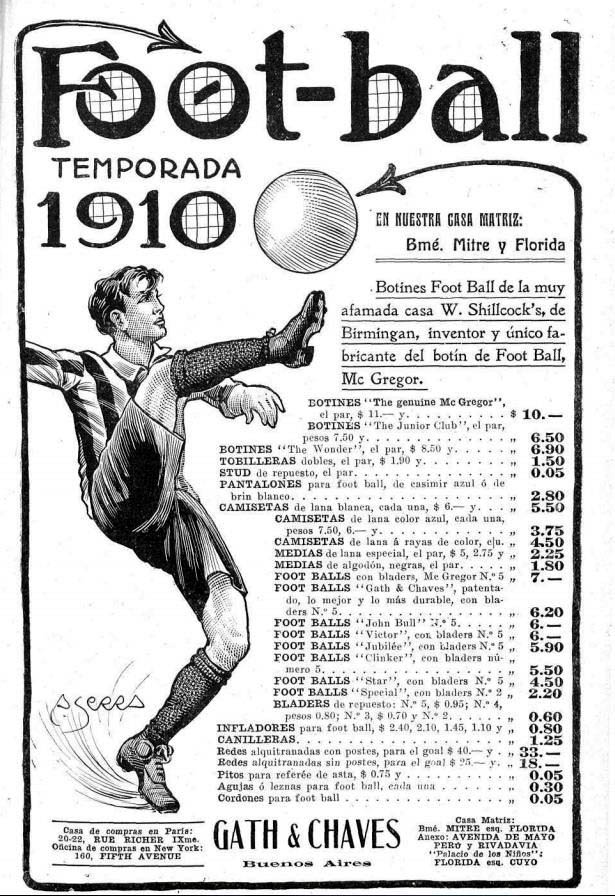
Gath & Chaves advertisement promoting "foot-ball" products, including boots endorsed by McGregor in Argentina in 1910

Between 1888 and 1894 McGregor also served as chairman of The Football Association (the FA), English football's overall governing body, which had existed since 1863. He became known as a football celebrity, writing a weekly column for the Birmingham Gazette and endorsing products such as footballs, and a type of football boot which the manufacturer billed as the "McGregor lace-to-toe boot". Though he held many different administrative posts in his lifetime, McGregor never played the sport competitively; his only on-pitch involvement was occasional goalkeeping during Aston Villa practices in the 1870s.

== Baseball ==
In 1890 McGregor was appointed President of the Aston Villa baseball club, for the upcoming professional 1890 National League of Baseball of Great Britain.

== Death and legacy ==
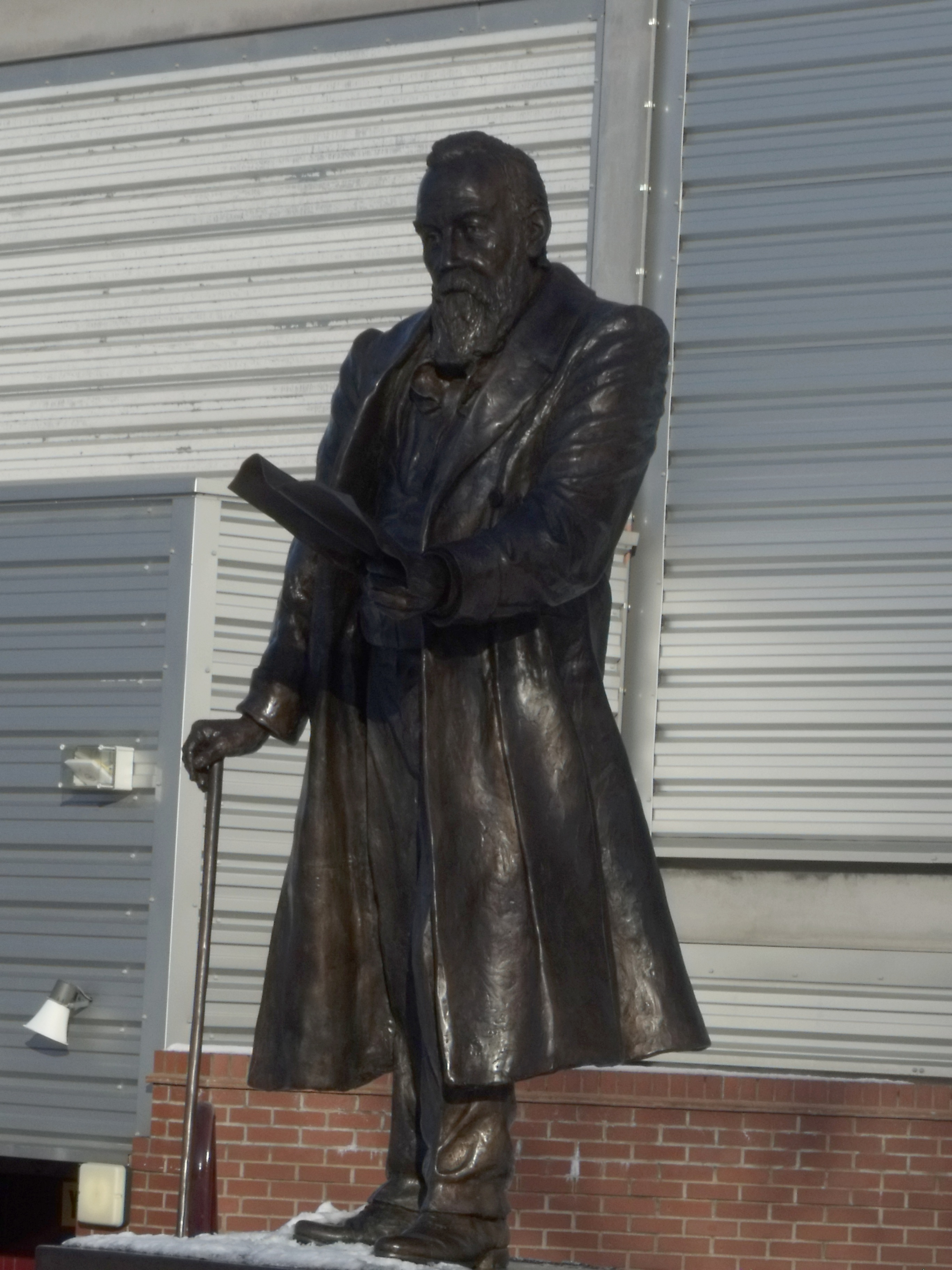
The statue of McGregor outside Villa Park

Although McGregor envisaged the League as a friendly union, within which clubs would share ticket revenues and work together in their mutual best interests, the immediate effect of its creation was that football came to be treated as a business for the first time, as opposed to something that players and officials simply regarded as a pastime. All the clubs involved experienced significant increases in their turnover, which at Aston Villa, McGregor's own club, increased more than sixfold between 1889 and 1899. The wages paid to players, however, remained low due to restrictions imposed by the FA, so clubs were able to use their increased profitability to build larger stadiums and accommodate ever larger crowds of spectators. Although the League initially contained a small number of clubs, all of which were based in the northern half of the country, by the early years of the twentieth century it included clubs from all parts of England. At its peak nearly 100 clubs played in the Football League, and it remained the pre-eminent competition in English football until the 1990s, when the top clubs broke away to form the Premier League. In keeping with McGregor's views on mutual support and co-operation, gate receipts were shared amongst the clubs until the 1980s, which helped to ensure that a select few wealthy clubs were not able to dominate the competition. McGregor himself had little interest in the business aspect of football, and was adamant that the Football League should not challenge the longstanding authority of the FA. The success of the Football League directly inspired the creation of similar competitions in other countries, beginning with Scotland, where the Scottish Football League was formed in 1890.

In May 1910, McGregor was taken ill and later confined to a nursing home. His condition worsened towards the end of 1911. His last public appearance was a committee meeting on 4 December, and he underwent an operation on 19 December. However, after a brief improvement in his condition he relapsed and died the following day. Although a devout Congregationalist, he is buried in the grounds of the Church of England parish church of St Mary, in Handsworth, alongside his wife, who died in 1908. McGregor is remembered as the "father of The Football League", an Aston Villa legend, and a legend of football in general.

Shortly before his death, the FA presented McGregor, who was at that time a vice-president of the association, with a long service medal. After his death, Aston Villa dedicated a bed in the children's ward of one of Birmingham's hospitals in his honour, and the Birmingham County Football Association unveiled a commemorative drinking fountain, which is now preserved at Villa Park, current home of his former club. In the modern era, Aston Villa selected him as one of the twelve inaugural members of its Hall of Fame, and named a hospitality suite at Villa Park after him. In 2008, the Aston Villa Supporters' Trust announced plans to further honour him with a bronze statue outside the stadium. The statue, by sculptor Sam Holland, is displayed outside the Directors' Entrance of the Trinity Road Stand, and was unveiled on 28 November 2009. The Trust also raised £1,000 to restore and rededicate McGregor's grave in 2011.

== Notes ==
- A. In the 1870s the concept of the referee had not been introduced to football. Matches were officiated by two umpires, one supplied by each of the two teams involved.
