= Dan Allsopp =

English footballer

Personal information
- Full name: Dennis Watkin Allsopp
- Date of birth: 13 February 1871
- Place of birth: Derby, England
- Date of death: 1921 (aged 49–50)
- Position: Goalkeeper

Senior career*
Years	Team	Apps	(Gls)
- Derby Junction
1892–1900	Nottingham Forest	206	(0)
- * Club domestic league appearances and goals

Dennis Watkin Allsopp (13 February 1871 – 1921) was a footballer who played in The Football League for Nottingham Forest. A goalkeeper, he also played for Derby Junction.

Allsop made his league debut for Nottingham Forest at the Town Ground on 24 December 1892 in the 3–1 victory against Wolverhampton Wanderers. In his last competitive appearance at West Bromwich Albion on 16 April 1900, Forest lost 8–0.

== Professional Baseball ==
In 1890 Allsopp played professional baseball for Derby Baseball Club in the National League of Baseball of Great Britain.

== Career statistics ==
Appearances and goals by club, season and competition
Club	Season	League			United Counties League		FA Cup		Total	
Club	Season	Division	Apps	Goals	Apps	Goals	Apps	Goals	Apps	Goals
Nottingham Forest	1892-93	First Division	10	0	-	-	0	0	10	0
Nottingham Forest	1893-94	First Division	25	0	5	0	4	0	34	0
Nottingham Forest	1894-95	First Division	27	0	7	0	3	0	37	0
Nottingham Forest	1895-96	First Division	29	0	-	-	1	0	30	0
Nottingham Forest	1896-97	First Division	29	0	-	-	4	0	33	0
Nottingham Forest	1897-98	First Division	26	0	-	-	6	0	32	0
Nottingham Forest	1898-99	First Division	34	0	-	-	3	0	37	0
Nottingham Forest	1899-1900	First Division	26	0	-	-	6	0	32	0
Nottingham Forest	Total		206	0	12	0	27	0	245	0
Career total			206	0	12	0	27	0	245	0

== Honours ==
Nottingham Forest

- FA Cup winner: 1898
