= Moses Sanders =

English footballer

Personal information
- Full name: Moses Sanders
- Date of birth: 26 September 1873
- Place of birth: Preston, England
- Date of death: 1941 (aged 67–68)
- Position: Half back

Senior career*
Years	Team	Apps	(Gls)
- Crewe Alexandra
1890–1891	Accrington	17	(1)
1891–1899	Preston North End	210	(20)
1899–1900	Woolwich Arsenal	4	(1)
- Dartford
Total		231	(22)
- * Club domestic league appearances and goals

Moses Sanders (26 September 1873 – 1941) was an English footballer who played in the Football League for Accrington, Preston North End and Woolwich Arsenal.

== Professional baseball ==
In 1890 Sanders played left field professionally for Preston North End Baseball Club in the National League of Baseball of Great Britain.
