= William Sudell =

British football businessman

Major William Sudell
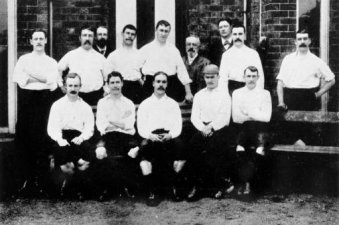
- William Sudell (back row, third from left) with his 1888–89 double-winning Preston North End team
- Born: 17 July 1850; Preston, England
- Died: 5 August 1911 (aged 61); Cape Town, South Africa
- Occupation(s): Mill manager, Chairman of Preston North End

Major William Sudell (1850–1911) was an English association football player and administrator, who was the first chairman of Preston North End. He joined the Preston Nelson sports club on 3 August 1867, aged 17. Initially a player of several sports, by his mid-twenties he had become chairman of the club. In 1880 the club decided to play football exclusively, and from the following year Sudell managed the team.

To aid the performances of his team, Sudell recruited several Scottish players, giving them nominal jobs in the cotton mill he managed. After a dispute arising from payments to players resulted in Preston's withdrawal from the 1884 FA Cup, Sudell became an outspoken proponent of professionalism. His actions resulted in the acceptance of professionalism by the Football Association (FA), and led to Preston becoming the leading team of the early professional era. Under Sudell's leadership, Preston North End became founder members of the Football League, and won a league and cup double, going unbeaten for the entire season.

Sudell's career as a football administrator ended in disgrace, when in 1895 he was found guilty of fraudulently redirecting funds from the mill to the football club. Sudell was sentenced to three years' imprisonment. Upon his release, he emigrated to South Africa, where he died in 1911.

== Football career ==
Born in Preston in 1850, descended from an old Preston family that included a Preston Guild Mayor, Sudell joined the Preston Nelson sports club in August 1867, aged 17. During this period the club were recruiting many young sportsmen from the area to play new sports, in order to relieve financial pressures. Sudell proved adept at several sports including swimming, cycling, cricket and rugby. The club played its first game of association football in 1878, against Eagley, with Sudell a member of the team. However, Sudell did not go on to play on a regular basis; only two other football matches featuring him as a player are known.

Sudell became the chairman of the sports club, which by then was known as Preston North End, in 1874 or 1875, while still in his mid-twenties. In 1880 the club voted to play football exclusively, and the following year Sudell took responsibility for the management of the team. From 1883 the club fielded several Scottish players, after Sudell went on a recruitment expedition to Scotland. The club arranged jobs for the players, and supplemented their income with off-balance sheet payments. At this time professionalism was not permitted, but such payments were common among Lancashire clubs.

After Preston won an FA Cup match against Upton Park in 1884, the Londoners protested, seeking the result to be overturned due to professionalism in the Preston ranks. This sparked a series of events which threatened to split the FA. Under Sudell's instruction, Preston withdrew from the competition. Fellow Lancashire clubs Burnley and Great Lever followed suit. The protest gathered momentum, to the point where more than 30 clubs, predominantly from the north, announced that they would set up a rival British Football Association if the FA did not permit professionalism. At the FA conference called to discuss the issue, Sudell was a member of the committee. He argued passionately for the acceptance of professionalism, but met opposition from southern-based amateur clubs, who viewed sport solely as a pastime. Backed by figures such as the more moderate but influential William McGregor of Aston Villa, the advocates of professionalism won the day and secured its acceptance. However, each club was permitted to only pay players who had been born or who had lived within six miles of the home stadium for at least two years.

With professionalism legalised, Preston flourished. Keen to make use of tactics, Sudell was the first person to use a blackboard to dictate positions and strategy to his players. In 1887, Preston recorded the biggest win in the history of the FA Cup, beating Hyde 26–0 in the first round. The club progressed to the final having amassed a run of 42 consecutive wins in all competitions, but were beaten in the FA Cup Final by West Bromwich Albion.

During this time moves were afoot to prevent cancellation of matches by creating a new competition with a "fixity of fixtures". The brainchild of Aston Villa's William McGregor, the competition became known as The Football League. Sudell himself suggested the name "Football League", as an alternative to McGregor's suggestion, "Association Football Union". Plans to create the competition had been ongoing for a period of months without Preston's involvement, but as the most skilful team McGregor was keen to interest them. Once involved, Sudell was eager for the embryonic League to assert primacy in relation to other competitions, joining with J. J. Bentley to propose that "The clubs forming the League shall support each other and bind themselves to carry out in the strictest sense the arrangements for matches between them, and not allow them to be cancelled on account of any cup competition or other matches". Sudell was more financially minded than the egalitarian McGregor, and urged the League to dispense with proposals for equal sharing of gate money and residential requirements for players.

The League kicked off in September 1888, with Preston one of the 12 founder members. North End proved superior to their opponents, winning the title with several matches to spare. This allowed the club to concentrate on the FA Cup, which they duly won by defeating Wolverhampton Wanderers. In completing the League and Cup double Preston remained unbeaten for the entire season. The team, nicknamed the "Invincibles", contained ten Scots, tempted south by the money on offer as professionalism was still banned in Scotland. Wishing for a grander gesture to celebrate his team's success than the League committee's suggestion of a flag bearing the club's name, Sudell convinced the League to spend 50 guineas on a trophy. However, despite being responsible for the creation of the trophy, Preston North End have not won it since.

For the first four years of the League's existence, Sudell acted as honorary treasurer. In 1892, with his health declining, Sudell relinquished his position, and was succeeded by Stoke's Harry Lockett. He left Preston North End the following year. In 1894 the League gave him £50 for a testimonial.

== Outside football ==
Sudell worked in a cotton mill, where thanks to his numeracy he quickly worked his way up the ranks; eventually he became manager. His military title came from service in the local Volunteer Force rifle unit, a precursor of the Territorial Army. He was initially commissioned as quartermaster in the 11th Lancashire Rifle Volunteer Corps in August 1874, he resigned that commission in February 1879, to take a commission as lieutenant in the same unit. He was promoted captain on 23 June 1886, and was granted the honorary rank of major on 19 October 1889; the unit had now become part of the 1st Volunteer Battalion of the Loyal North Lancashire Regiment. In March 1890 Sudell agreed to form a professional baseball club at Preston North End Baseball Club for the upcoming 1890 National League of Baseball of Great Britain. Professional football clubs were chosen as ideal partners for new baseball clubs. He retired on 30 July 1892, and was permitted to retain his rank, and continue wearing the battalion's uniform.

=== Embezzlement ===
After his time as Preston chairman, in 1895, Sudell was convicted of embezzling thousands of pounds from the cotton mill at which he worked, in order to fund players' wages and expenses, though he did not gain personally. The fraud, totalling £5,326, resulted in a three-year prison sentence. Upon his release, Sudell emigrated to South Africa. In Cape Town, Sudell enjoyed a successful second career as a popular sports writer and footballing missionary. A member of the editorial staff of the South African News, he became one of the foremost sporting experts in the colony. Sudell rebuilt his life. According to this account Sudell became a successful rugby journalist, dying from pneumonia on 5 August 1911.
