= William Hogan (footballer) =

English footballer

Personal information
- Date of birth: 1871
- Place of birth: Aldershot, England
- Position: Winger

Senior career*
Years	Team	Apps	(Gls)
1889–1890	Church		
1890–1895	Fleetwood Rangers		
1895–1896	Leicester Fosse	0	(0)
1896–1897	Grimsby Town	1	(0)
1897–1???	Nelson		
- * Club domestic league appearances and goals

William Hogan (1871 – after 1896) was an English professional footballer who played as a winger. When Hogan signed for Leicester he was "recognised as one of the best baseball players in England" and was wanted by Preston North End.

== Professional baseball ==
Hogan was a professional pitcher for Preston North End Baseball Club in the 1890 National League of Baseball of Great Britain.
