= Leech Maskrey =

American baseball player (1854–1922)

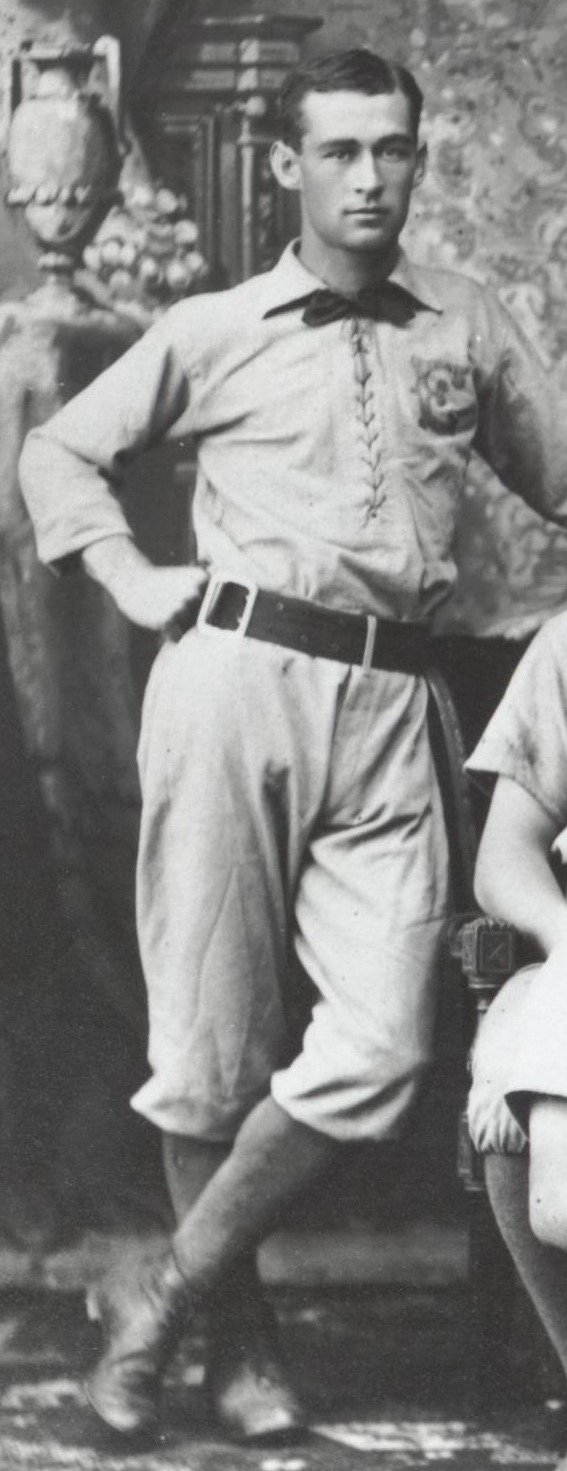
- Maskrey with the Louisville Eclipse in 1882
- Outfielder
- Born: February 11, 1854; Mercer, Pennsylvania, U.S.
- Died: April 1, 1922 (aged 68); Mercer, Pennsylvania, U.S.
- Batted: Right Threw: Right

MLB debut
- May 2, 1882, for the Louisville Eclipse

Last MLB appearance
- July 7, 1886, for the Cincinnati Red Stockings

MLB statistics
- Batting average: .225
- Home runs: 2
- Runs scored: 190
- Stats at Baseball Reference

Teams
- Louisville Eclipse/Colonels (1882–1886); Cincinnati Red Stockings (1886)

Samuel Leech Maskrey (February 11, 1854 – April 1, 1922) was an American outfielder in Major League Baseball. He played five seasons in the majors, from 1882 to 1886, for the Louisville Eclipse/Colonels and Cincinnati Red Stockings. His brother, Harry Maskrey, was his teammate on the 1882 Eclipse.

== Biography ==
After spending the 1887 to 1889 seasons playing minor league baseball, Maskrey was part of a contingent sent to England in 1890 by Albert Spalding at the behest of the newly-formed professional National League of Baseball of Great Britain. He was signed by Preston North End Baseball Club as player-coach and was club captain. This organization had sent a letter to the American Spalding requesting help in establishing a league. They requested eight to ten players to coach and convert the existing players (whose primary game was usually soccer). Spalding sent a skilled manager, Jim Hart, along with players Maskrey, William J. Barr, Charles Bartlett, and J. E. Prior. Maskrey was the only one of the players who had played in the majors to that point, and he stayed there for one season as a player-manager of Preston North End.

Following his time in England, Maskrey returned to the U.S. minor leagues in 1891, where he played for the Tacoma team in the Pacific Northwestern League. After spending the 1892 season with the Atlanta Firecrackers of the Southern Association, part of which he spent as a player-manager, he retired and went into the hotel business with his brother Harry.
