= Derby Baseball Club =

Defunct professional baseball club from Derby England

Information
- League: National League
- Location: Derby, United Kingdom
- Ballpark: Baseball Ground
- Founded: 1890, re-founded 1890
- Folded: 1890 then again in 1900
- League championships: 1895, 1897, 1899
- Colors: White, Black, Grey
- Ownership: Francis Ley

Current uniforms
Home

Derby Baseball Club is a defunct professional baseball club from Derby England, formed as Ley's Recreation Club by Francis Ley in 1890 and dissolved in the same year. A new Derby Baseball Club was formed (with Ley as chairman) in 1890 to succeed his dissolved club, this new Derby Baseball Club played until 1900, winning numerous National League titles in the 1890s, albeit as amateurs.

== History ==
Baseball was introduced to Derby by Francis Ley, an industrialist who owned Ley's Malleable Castings. Following a visit to the United States of America in 1889, Ley decided that, as a way of ensuring a healthier and more productive workforce, an investment should be made in promoting recreation for his workers.

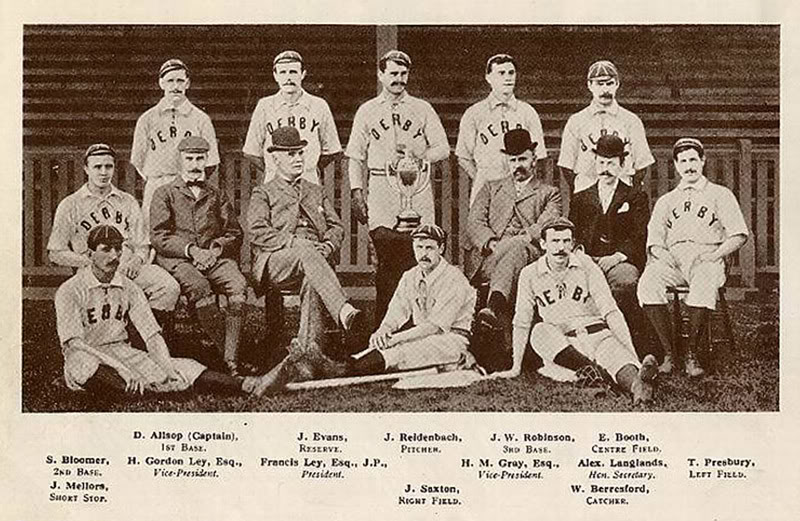
The Derby Baseball Club, with Steve Bloomer on 2nd base and Jack Robinson on 3rd. Francis Ley is in the bowler hat.

== Ballpark ==
During his journey to the States, Ley had seen the way in which baseball fields had been laid out by companies and factories for the use by their workers and decided to follow suit on his return to Derby. Consequently, Ley had the Ley's Recreation Centre (later renamed Baseball Ground) built; a 12-acre (49,000 m^{2}) park for the use of workers with cricket and baseball facilities. The Baseball Ground eventually became the home stadium of football club Derby County.

== Uniform ==
It was stated that for their first ever game Derby's uniforms were very similar to those worn by Blackburn Rovers and were supplied by Thompson and Sons of Babbington Lane. For the 1890 National League of Baseball of Great Britain season Derby played in grey uniforms, with blue lettering to the front.

== First ever game ==
In March 1890 local press featured advertisements appealing for "professionals aged 20 to 25" and "cricketers who can field smartly" to attend Ley's Recreation Centre to help form a new club.

In May 1890 Ley's Recreation Club hosted Erdington in “the first baseball match ever played in Derby”. Due to the expert coaching of Americans Bryan, Bullas and Reidenbach Ley's team stormed to a 23–0 lead after just two innings, at which point the Americans competed the rest of the game on the side of Erdington. The game closed out with a 23–11 win for Ley's Recreation Club. The Ley's roster for the game was:

- Dan Allsopp
- Edwin Booth
- William C. Bryan
- Sim Bullas
- H. M. Middleton
- ? Millar
- W. North
- S. Presbury
- John Reidenbach

In the following days the local press had dropped the Ley's Recreation Club name in favour of ‘The Derby Baseball Club’.

== National League of Baseball of Great Britain ==
Ley was not in attendance, in October 1889, when supporters of a proposed National League of Baseball of Great Britain met at the Criterion, London, to formally establish the new baseball association, though he was elected as a provisional officer. Representatives of Preston North End, Gloucester County Cricket Club, Essex County Cricket Club, Staffordshire County Cricket Club, Aston Villa and the National Rounders Association all were represented and elected as officers to the association, with Newton Crane elected to the chair. In March 1890 William Sudell agreed to form a professional baseball club at Preston North End and Francis Ley agreed to form a professional baseball club for Derby. It was proposed that a twelve club National League will be formed, with teams to be based at Wolverhampton, Liverpool, Accrington, Manchester, Bolton, Stoke-on-Trent and Birmingham.

In June the first annual meeting of the National League of Baseball of Great Britain was held at the Queens Hotel, Birmingham, with the constitution being drawn up. Thomas Slaney (president) and Harry Lockett (administrator) of the Stoke Baseball Club), Francis Ley (president of Derby Baseball Club), William McGregor (President of the Aston Villa Baseball Club) and James Allard on behalf of the absent William Sudell (president of the Preston North End Baseball Club) were all in attendance, Morton Betts was in the chair. A National League schedule was confirmed for the four clubs, Francis Ley agreed to supply the pennants and badges for the winning club.

On 4 August Secretary Alexander Langland of Derby officially ‘retires’ the club from the National League, with immediate effect, citing financial losses and low attendances. On 5 August Ley wrote to the Derby Daily Telegraph to propose that the ‘retired’ Derby take on other local baseball clubs for a local challenge cup, donating £52 10s. towards a cup for the winning club. On 8 August the Derbyshire Advertiser and Journal stated that “owing to the decision of the National League requiring the Derby club to not pitch Reidenbach, the American pitcher, in remaining championship matches, the Derby club have withdrawn from the league.” Ley threatened that he intended to cease the activities of the club altogether, and had refused A. G. Spalding’s request for Derby to finish their National League fixtures. It was stated that Reidenbach and Bullas, American professionals at Derby, are the only Americans in the employ of Ley, in order to allow them to play for Derby.

On 8 August Morton Betts, Secretary of the National League of Baseball of Great Britain issued a statement, in response to “incorrect statements” given to regional press by Ley, on events leading up to Derby ‘retiring‘ from the National League. It was stated that on the 9 July Ley agreed to only use his professional American pitchers in games versus Aston Villa, and that under this new arrangement Derby had lost four out of their six matches, harming their championship prospects to the degree that Ley broke a number of bye-laws, under threat of his Derby club withdrawing from the league, including refusing to field a nine on 6 August and giving the League Board no option but to erase the National League record of Derby. On 11 August the Birmingham Daily Post wrote that three of the four National League clubs were being financed by Spalding Bros, whereby Derby were financed by Ley, leading to various financial disagreements.

On 15 August the Derby Daily Telegraph published an article claiming that the Derby had won the National League, under Section 21 of the league constitution, under which it was said the club with the highest win percentage will be the winner of the pennant. The club claimed that up until their ‘withdrawal’ from the National League, on 5 August, they would have a win percentage that would have been unachievable for the remaining clubs, based on their completed season stats to that date. In reality Aston Villa were the first and only professional baseball champions of Great Britain, being awarded the pennant for the season, with Derby's record expunged from the official stats.

Derby Baseball Club 1890 National League players:

- Dan Allsopp
- H. Bates
- Edwin Booth
- William C. Bryan
- Sim Bullas
- James Mellors
- H. M. Middleton
- W. North
- S. Presbury
- John Reidenbach

== Dissolution and new Derby Baseball Club ==
In August 1890 a meeting at the Athenaeum, Derby, took place to discuss the idea of forming a new baseball club for the town. It was noted that Ley was to be elected as chairman of the new club, given that his old club had been dissolved. Ley agreed to the town's new baseball club being tenants of the Ley's Recreation Centre (known later as the Baseball Ground) rent free until the club was making a profit. It was reported that “for all practical purposes it (the dissolved club) was Ley’s Recreation Club” and the new club would be the real Derby Baseball Club. Ley also maintained his claim that his dissolved works club had actually won the 1890 National League of Baseball of Great Britain and not Aston Villa, who were the official pennant winners. Ley also agreed to supply all uniforms and equipment.

It was questioned by the local population at the meeting who the new Derby club would have as opposition, if they were to remain outside the National League, to which Ley agreed to donate 50 Guineas to establish a ‘Ley’s Challenge Cup‘ for the new town club to compete for. By June 1891 Ley had withdrawn his offer of funds for the proposed Challenge Cup and stated that he believed baseball was dead in Derby. This lull, however, was short lived, with the Derby baseball club once again taking its place in the national championship within weeks of Ley's prediction of the death of baseball.

== Success at last ==
Steve Bloomer, and the Derby County goalkeeper Jack Robinson both made their first appearances for Derby Baseball Club on 5 May 1894 in a 33-4 win against a team selected from the other clubs who were affiliated to the Derby Baseball Association. Ley led the new Derby Baseball Club to a period of national dominance until 1900, winning the (now amateur) national League title in 1895, 1897 and 1899. A photograph of the 1897 roster shows football star Steve Bloomer still played at that time for Ley's Derby Baseball Club.

== Derby County name confusion ==
Throughout 1899 Ley set about encouraging regional football clubs to form baseball clubs, with the view to forming a new baseball league. As a result, a number of new rivals to Derby Baseball Club emerged, including a Nottingham Forest Baseball Club and a new Derby based club... Derby County Baseball Club.

In the 1900 season both Derby Baseball Club and Derby County Baseball Club existed in the same league, which appears to have led to confusion in modern history. In May 1900 a joint advertisement regarding season tickets for both clubs appeared in regional press, with both clubs having their own secretaries. In fact Ley's Derby Baseball Club was never commonly known as Derby County Baseball Club, so the new club appears to be short lived and the only time a real Derby County Baseball Club actually existed, contrary to popular modern belief.

Local news reports from the 1900 season make it appear that Derby Baseball Club were the continuation of Ley's official Derby club, with players including Saxton, Berresford and Booth still being on the Derby Baseball Club roster. In February 1900 a Derby Baseball Club roster was reported to still include Steve Bloomer, however on 27 June 1900 it was reported that Derby Baseball Club had defeated Derby County, sending Derby Baseball Club top of the National League. The Derby County Baseball Club roster for the game featured Steve Bloomer. Had Bloomer defected to the newly formed Derby County Baseball Club? At this point both clubs appear to disappear, though it seems apparent Ley's two successive Derby Baseball Clubs, formed from his Ley's Recreation Club, were never universally known as Derby County Baseball Club.

== Notable players ==
- (England) Dan Allsopp
- (England) Steve Bloomer
- (United States) William C. Bryan
- (United States) Sim Bullas
- (United States) John Reidenbach
- (England) Jack Robinson

== Honours ==
- British Champions: 3
  - 1895, 1897, 1899

== See also ==
- Baseball in the United Kingdom
- 1890 National League of Baseball of Great Britain
- British baseball
