= 1890 National League of Baseball of Great Britain =

The 1890 National League of Baseball of Great Britain was the first, and to date only, professional baseball championship for the national baseball title of Great Britain. The National League's headquarters were located at 38 Holborn Viaduct, London. Aston Villa were the National League champions, despite Derby Baseball Club leading the league for much of the season, following their contentious dismissal from the championship, mid-season. Aston Villa were officially known as Birmingham Baseball Club Limited, with their uniforms emblazoned with 'Birmingham AV' on the jersey, despite being officially part of the famous football club. As a result, in some reports of the day, they were referred to as Birmingham. Preston Amateurs were the Amateur League champions, beating Birmingham Amateurs 43–15 and 42–7 in a best of three finals. A large number of leading football and cricket professionals of the era were involved, alongside American professional baseball players.

== Events ==
- 10 February – Morton Betts, honorary Secretary of the National League appeals to professional football clubs to form baseball clubs.
- 5 March – It is reported that the National League of Baseball of Great Britain has asked for A. G. Spalding to send several American professionals to the United Kingdom to be distributed across National League clubs.
- 6 March – William Sudell agrees to form a professional baseball club at Preston North End and Francis Ley agrees to form a professional baseball club for Derby from his Ley’s Recreation Club. Professional football clubs were chosen as ideal partners for new baseball clubs. It is suggested that a twelve club National League will be formed, with teams to be based at Wolverhampton, Liverpool, Accrington, Manchester, Bolton, Stoke and Birmingham.
- 22 March – A maximum salary of £15 per month, plus travel expenses, is offered to American professional baseball players to join National League clubs in the United Kingdom.
- 6 June – The first annual meeting of the National League of Baseball of Great Britain is held at the Queens Hotel, Birmingham, with the constitution being drawn up and agreed upon. The constitution broadly followed the rules and regulations of the American leagues. It is reported that ninety Baseball clubs now exist in the United Kingdom. Thomas Slaney (president) and Harry Lockett (administrator) of the Stoke Baseball Club), Francis Ley (president of Derby Baseball Club, William McGregor (president of the Aston Villa Baseball Club) and James Allard on behalf of the absent William Sudell (president of Preston North End Baseball Club) were all in attendance, Morton Betts was in the chair. A National League schedule was confirmed for the four clubs, with Aston Villa hosting Stoke on the 21 June on opening day. A 42-game season is agreed upon, Francis Ley will supply the pennants and badges for the winning club.
- 14 June – Newton Crane, President of the National League and Morton Betts, Secretary and all elected officers from the league committee reiterate their commitment to expanding the league across the United Kingdom following the first season.
- 14 July – Aston Villa issue a formal apology to Francis Ley for unsporting behaviour of their players at Derby Baseball Club and accept the fines given to them by the National League.
- 4 August – Secretary Alexander Langland of Derby Baseball Club officially 'retires' the club from the National League, with immediate effect, citing financial losses and low attendances
- 4 August – In a meeting at the Athenaeum, Derby, a new baseball club for the town of Derby was formed. It was noted that Francis Ley was to be elected as chairman of the new club, given that his old club had been dissolved. Ley agreed to the new Derby Baseball Club being tenants of the Ley's Recreation Centre (known later as the Baseball Ground) rent free until the club was making a profit. It was reported that "for all practical purposes it (the dissolved club) was Ley's Recreation Club" and the new club would be the real Derby Baseball club. Ley also maintained his claim that his dissolved works club had actually won the 1890 National League pennant and not Aston Villa.
- 5 August – Francis Ley writes to the Derby Daily Telegraph to propose that the 'retired' Derby Baseball Club take on other local baseball clubs for a local challenge cup, he donates £52 10s. towards a cup for the winning club.
- 8 August – The Derbyshire Advertiser and Journal state that "owing to the decision of the National League requiring the Derby club to not pitch Reidenbach, the American pitcher, in remaining championship matches, the Derby club have withdrawn from the league." Francis Ley confirmed that he intended to cease the activities of the club, and had refused A. G. Spalding's request for Derby Baseball Club to finish their National League fixtures. It is confirmed that Reidenbach and Bullas, American professionals at Derby, are the only Americans in the employ of Francis Ley, in order to allow them to play for Derby.
- 8 August – Morton Betts, secretary of the National League of Baseball of Great Britain issues a statement, in response to continued "incorrect statements" given to regional press by Francis Ley, on events leading up to Derby Baseball Club 'retiring' from the National League. It is stated that on the 9 July Francis Ley agreed to only use his professional American pitchers in games versus Aston Villa, that under this new arrangement Derby lost four out of their six matches, harming their championship prospects to the degree that Francis Ley broke a number of bye-laws under threat of his Derby club withdrawing from the league, including refusing to field a nine on 6 August and giving the League Board no option but to erase the National League record of Derby.
- 11 August – The Birmingham Daily Post claims that three of the four National League clubs are being financed by Spalding Bros, whereby Derby Baseball Club are financed by Francis Ley, leading to various financial disagreements.
- 15 August – The Derby Daily Telegraph publishes an article claiming that the Derby Baseball Club have actually won the National League, under Section 21 of the league constitution, under which it is said the club with the highest win percentage will be the winner of the pennant. The club claim that up until their 'withdrawal' from the National League, 5 August, they would have a win percentage that would have been unachievable for the remaining clubs, based on their completed season stats to that date.
- 3 September – Aston Villa and Preston North End Baseball Club are both accused of cheating during the season.
- 12 November – Preston North End Baseball Club reflect on being crowned winners of the Amateur League. It is reported that attendances of the Preston North End National League had exceeded 5,000 per game.

== Champions ==
- National League: Aston Villa
- Amateur League: Preston Amateurs

=== National League final standings ===
Team	Played	Won	Lost	Pct.	Games back
Aston Villa	25	17	8	0.680	-
Preston North End Baseball Club	27	17	10	0.630	1.0
Stoke	24	4	20	0.167	12.5
Derby Baseball Club	-	-	-	-	-

Derby Baseball Club expelled from the National League championship mid-season, record expunged.

== Rosters ==
=== Aston Villa ===
- Frank Barr
- William Barr (player-manager)
- Arthur Brown
- James Cowan
- Fred Dawson
- Abel Devey
- John Devey
- Harry Devey
- Will Devey
- H. E. Simon
- Joey Simmonds
- Frank Stevenson
- Harry Widdowson

=== Derby Baseball Club ===
- Dan Allsopp
- H. Bates
- Edwin Booth
- William C. Bryan
- Sim Bullas
- James Mellors
- H. M. Middleton
- W. North
- S. Presbury
- John Reidenbach

=== Preston North End ===
- H. Brown
- J. Brown
- ? Colford
- Samuel Dobson
- George Drummond
- Billy Hendry
- Billy Hogan
- W. Livesey
- Leech Maskrey (player-coach)
- Moses Saunders
- William Stewart
- James Trainer

W. Livesey was a sprinter of some regional notoriety who played as a reserve for Preston North End, local rugby union and as a professional baseball player for Preston North End. He was killed in 1893.

=== Stoke ===
- ? Ainsworth
- Charles B. Bartlett (player-coach)
- William Dunn
- John Eccles
- ? Holdford
- Edgar Montford
- ? Morrell
- ? Powner
- James Prior
- Bill Rowley
- Wilmot Turner
- Alf Underwood

Edgar Montford was one of two footballing brothers who played for Stoke City in the era, Edgar was part of the Stoke City football squad of 1889-90 so it is assumed this was the brother who was a professional baseball player in the same year. Harry Montford had left Stoke City for Leek by 1890.
