= James West (football manager) =

English football manager and secretary

Personal information
- Place of birth: England

Managerial career
- Years: Team
- 1897–1900: Lincoln City
- 1900–1903: Newton Heath/Manchester United

James West was the second full-time secretary and de facto manager of football club Newton Heath, the precursor to Manchester United (the term "manager" was not in common usage at the club until the arrival of Jack Robson in 1914).

== Career ==
West oversaw Newton Heath's financial collapse and near bankruptcy, followed by the club's rebirth as Manchester United on 28 April 1902.
