= John Bentley (football manager) =

English footballer (1860–1918)

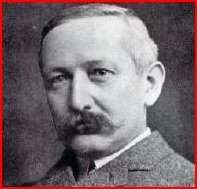

Personal information
- Full name: John James Bentley
- Date of birth: 1860
- Place of birth: Chapeltown, Lancashire, England
- Date of death: 2 September 1918 (aged 57–58)
- Place of death: Chapeltown, Lancashire, England

Senior career*
| Years | Team | Apps | (Gls) |
| 1878–1885 | Turton | | |

Managerial career
- 1885–1886: Bolton Wanderers
- 1887–1895: Bolton Wanderers
- 1899–1912: Turton
- 1912–1914: Manchester United
- * Club domestic league appearances and goals

John James Bentley (1860 – 2 September 1918) was an English football player and manager, captain, and variously secretary, treasurer and president of Turton F.C., secretary of Bolton Wanderers, the fourth full-time secretary of Manchester United, president of the Football League and vice-president of The Football Association.

== Early life ==
Turton F.C. is one of the oldest football clubs in the world; records show that Christ Church F.C. (now Bolton Wanderers) were "initiated by Turton into the technicalities of the London Association Game". Turton played many famous sides including Bolton Wanderers, Blackburn Rovers, Everton, Nottingham Forest, Preston North End and Sheffield Wednesday, and many lesser known local teams such as Westhoughton, Astley Bridge and Darwen F.C. Records show that most of them "retired well beaten", until the introduction of professionals "put the boot on the other leg".

Many of these teams came to Turton for guidance, learning the newly established rules of the game; as such Turton F.C. played a substantial role in the development of the game as we now know it. Records show Turton hosting matches as far back as 1830, though it was not until August 1874 that members voted "that the Rules of the London Football Association be adopted".

== Career ==
Bentley's first match for Turton F.C. was against Westhoughton in November 1878, at the age of eighteen. Bentley stepped in when Turton were a man down. After "showing his paces" he became a regular in the team, proving himself to be an excellent half-back. From 1879 onward, he was sending in match reports to local newspapers. He wrote up the Turton matches under the pen name "Free Critic" and, freely critical of his own performances, contributed regular articles to the Bolton Weekly Journal "Cricket and Football Field".

Bentley was playing for Turton F.C. in September 1880, when at the invitation of Darwen F.C. the two teams formed the Lancashire County Football Association. Challenges were sent to the Manchester Association, Bolton Wanderers, Cob Wall (Blackburn), Blackburn Rovers, Birch Association, Astley Bridge and Christ Church (Blackburn) Clubs for matches.

Bentley was first team captain in 1881 when Sheffield Wednesday came to Turton for an FA Cup match, soon becoming first secretary and then treasurer of Turton F.C.

In 1882, aged 22, he set himself up as an accountant in Acresfield, Bolton. His business thrived, and by 1885 he had given up playing, becoming a collector of income tax and the secretary of Bolton Wanderers. He was described at this time as "bold but extravagant, a genius who lived in the future, inspired by a vision of what football could become".

In 1886, he left his Bolton accountant's office to work in Manchester as assistant editor, and later editor, of The Athletic News. He became a regular columnist in the Daily Express, Daily Mail and Football chat, a weekly magazine.

In 1887, William McGregor contacted Bentley about the formation of a football league, because of his influence over Lancashire football. He became a founder committee member of the football league, becoming president on McGregor's retirement in 1894, holding the position until 1910 when he became a life member of the Football League management committee.

After leaving Bolton Wanderers, he became the secretary of Manchester United in 1912. However, he was rather less successful in this role than his predecessor, Ernest Mangnall; he took little interest in the running of the team and largely left the players to their own devices. As a result, the club slumped from being title challengers to barely avoiding relegation, and Bentley handed over to Jack Robson in 1914. He remained involved with Manchester United until retiring from club administration, in 1916, due to ill health. He became vice-president of the FA. Throughout he maintained contact with Turton FC, and was president of the club in the early years of the 20th century.

== Personal life and death ==
Bentley was born in June 1860 in Chapeltown, a small village to the south of Darwen, between Bolton and Blackburn. His father ran the grocer's shop on Chapeltown high street, next door to the Chetham Arms public house. His older brothers Thomas and William joined in with the first games played under the Harrow rules, but John was too young to play until the Association Rules had been introduced.

Bentley married and had three children.

Bentley died aged 58, on 2 September 1918 at Fairhaven, Lytham St Annes. He was buried in St Anne's Churchyard, Chapeltown, on 5 September 1918.

== Honours ==
Turton FC

- Lancashire Junior Cup: 1899–1900, 1901–02, 1902–03, 1904–05
- Lancashire Amateur Shield: 1912–13
