= 1888–89 Wolverhampton Wanderers F.C. season =

English football club season

Wolverhampton Wanderers
1888–89 season
- Club secretary: Jack Addenbrooke
- Football League: 3rd
- FA Cup: Runners-up
- Top goalscorer: League: Harry Wood (13); All: Harry Wood (14)
- Highest home attendance: 10,000 (vs The Wednesday, 2 March 1889)
- Lowest home attendance: 2,000 (vs Bolton, 10 November 1888)
- Average home league attendance: 4,545 (league only)
Home colours

The 1888–89 season was the first season of competitive league football in the history of English football club Wolverhampton Wanderers. They played in the inaugural season of the newly formed Football League. The club finished in third place in the league, and as runners-up in the FA Cup.

The team scored the first goal in Football League history when they took the lead against Aston Villa on the league's opening day. This match, as with all other home games for Wolves, was staged at Dudley Road in Wolverhampton, the only league campaign in which the club have not been based at Molineux.

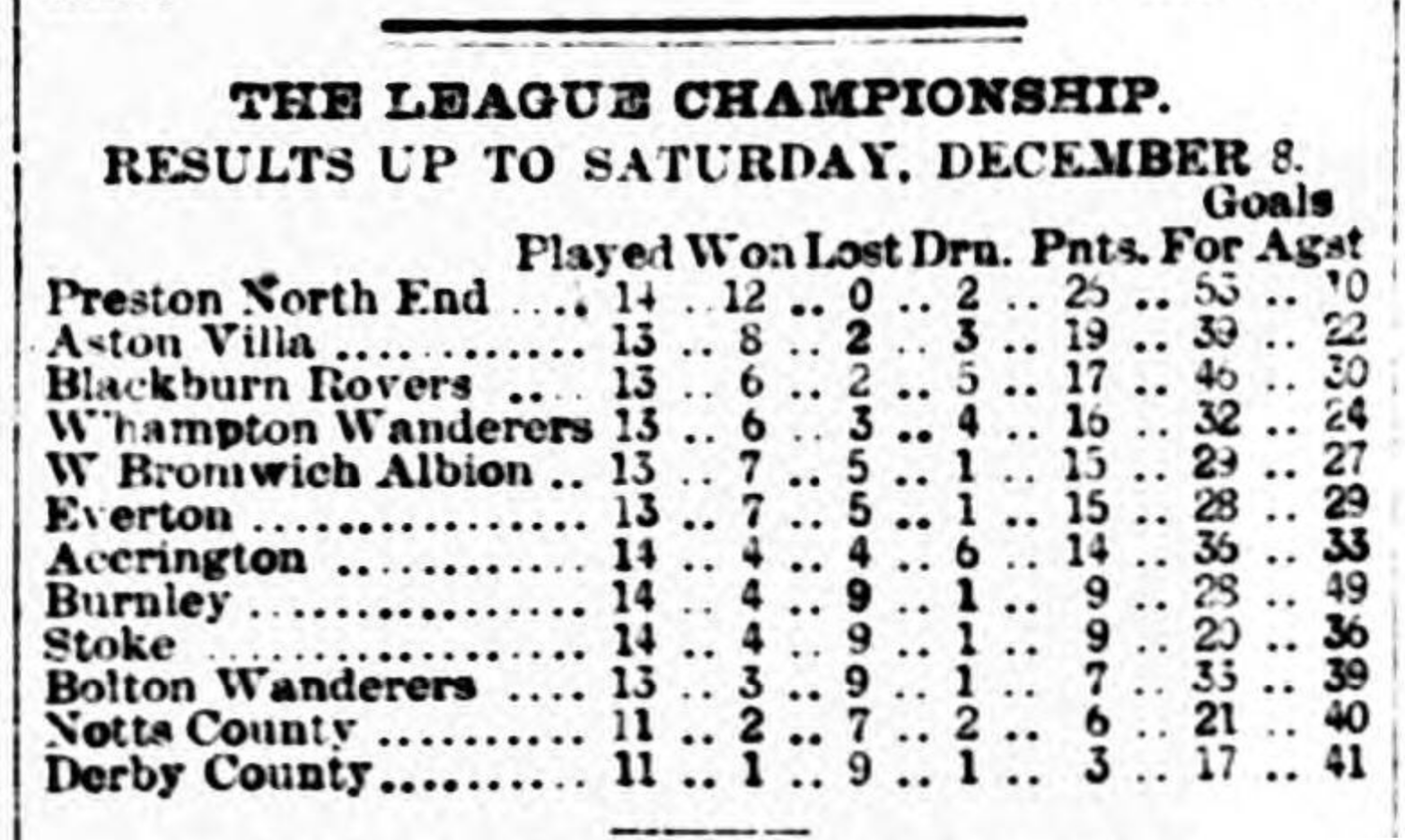
Saturday 8 December 1888

== Results ==
=== Football League ===
A total of twelve teams competed in the inaugural Football League in the 1888–89 season. Each team would play every other team twice, once at their stadium, and once at the opposition's. Two points were awarded to teams for each win, one point per draw, and none for defeats.

8 September 1888 1	Wolverhampton Wanderers	1–1	Aston Villa	Wolverhampton
	Cox (o.g.)		Green	Stadium: Dudley Road; Attendance: 2,500

15 September 1888 2	Wolverhampton Wanderers	0–4	Preston North End	Wolverhampton
			Gordon; Ross; A Goodall; J Goodall	Stadium: Dudley Road; Attendance: 5,000

22 September 1888 3	Wolverhampton Wanderers	4–1	Burnley	Wolverhampton
	Hunter; Knight; White		A. Brady	Stadium: Dudley Road; Attendance: 4,000

29 September 1888 4	Wolverhampton Wanderers	2–2	Blackburn Rovers	Wolverhampton
	Cooper; Wykes		Southworth	Stadium: Dudley Road; Attendance: 5,000

6 October 1888 5	Accrington	4–4	Wolverhampton Wanderers	Accrington
	Barbour; Brand; Holden		Knight; Wood; Fletcher; Stevenson (o.g.)	Stadium: Thorneyholme Road; Attendance: 4,000

13 October 1888 6	Burnley	0–4	Wolverhampton Wanderers	Burnley
			Wood; Knight; Hunter	Stadium: Turf Moor; Attendance: 4,000

20 October 1888 7	Blackburn Rovers	2–2	Wolverhampton Wanderers	Blackburn
	Haresnape; Unknown		Wood; Brodie	Stadium: Leamington Road; Attendance: 3,500

27 October 1888 8	Preston North End	5–2	Wolverhampton Wanderers	Preston
	Gordon; Ross; J Goodall		Brodie; Wykes	Stadium: Deepdale; Attendance: 5,000

3 November 1888 9	Wolverhampton Wanderers	4–1	Derby County	Wolverhampton
	Wood; Brodie		Lees	Stadium: Dudley Road; Attendance: 6,000

10 November 1888 10	Wolverhampton Wanderers	3–2	Bolton Wanderers	Wolverhampton
	Brodie; Cooper; Knight		Brogan; McGuinness	Stadium: Dudley Road; Attendance: 2,000

17 November 1888 11	Stoke	0–1	Wolverhampton Wanderers	Stoke-on-Trent
			Brodie	Stadium: Victoria Ground; Attendance: 2,000

24 November 1888 12	Aston Villa	2–1	Wolverhampton Wanderers	Birmingham
	Goodall		Brodie	Stadium: Wellington Road; Attendance: 6,000

8 December 1888 13	Wolverhampton Wanderers	4–0	Accrington	Wolverhampton
	Brodie; Cooper; Knight			Stadium: Dudley Road; Attendance: 3,000

15 December 1888 14	Wolverhampton Wanderers	2–1	West Bromwich Albion	Wolverhampton
	Brodie; Hunter		Pearson	Stadium: Dudley Road; Attendance: 3,000

22 December 1888 15	Wolverhampton Wanderers	4–1	Stoke	Wolverhampton
	Brodie; Wood; Wykes		Sloane	Stadium: Dudley Road; Attendance: 3,000

29 December 1888 16	Bolton Wanderers	2–1	Wolverhampton Wanderers	Bolton
	Weir unknown (o.g.)		Cooper	Stadium: Pike’s Lane; Attendance: 5,500

5 January 1889 17	West Bromwich Albion	1–3	Wolverhampton Wanderers	West Bromwich
	Woodhall		Brodie; Hunter; Cooper	Stadium: Stoney Lane; Attendance: 4,000

12 January 1889 18	Derby County	3–0	Wolverhampton Wanderers	Derby
	Cooper; L. Plackett; Higgins			Stadium: Racecourse Ground; Attendance: 2,000

19 January 1889 19	Notts County	3–0	Wolverhampton Wanderers	Nottingham
	Cursham; E. May			Stadium: Trent Bridge; Attendance: 3,000

26 January 1889 20	Wolverhampton Wanderers	5–0	Everton	Wolverhampton
	Lowder; Brodie; Knight; Wood			Stadium: Dudley Road; Attendance: 3,500

9 February 1889 21	Everton	1–2	Wolverhampton Wanderers	Liverpool
	Chadwick		Knight; Wood	Stadium: Anfield; Attendance: 6,000

23 February 1889 22	Wolverhampton Wanderers	2–1	Notts County	Wolverhampton
	Knight; Wood		Jackson	Stadium: Dudley Road; Attendance: 4,000

Final table

Pos	Team	Pld	W	D	L	F	A	GA	Pts
1	Preston North End	22	18	4	0	74	15	4.93	40
2	Aston Villa	22	12	5	5	61	43	1.42	29
3	Wolverhampton Wanderers	22	12	4	6	51	37	1.38	28
4	Blackburn Rovers	22	10	6	6	66	45	1.47	26

Source: Statto

Results by round

Round	1	2	3	4	5	6	7	8	9	10	11	12	13	14	15	16	17	18	19	20	21	22
Result	D	L	W	D	D	W	D	L	W	W	W	L	W	W	W	L	W	L	L	W	W	W
Position	5	9	7	6	7	5	5	7	6	4	4	5	4	4	3	3	3	3	4	3	3	3

Source: Statto.com
W = Win; D = Draw; L = Loss

=== FA Cup ===
2 February 1889 R1	Wolverhampton Wanderers	4–3	Old Carthusians	Wolverhampton
	Wykes; Knight; Mason			Stadium: Dudley Road; Attendance: 6,000

16 February 1889 R2	Wolverhampton Wanderers	6–1	Walsall Town Swifts	Wolverhampton
	Knight; Brodie; Hunter; Lowder			Stadium: Dudley Road; Attendance: 5,000

2 March 1889 R3	Wolverhampton Wanderers	3–0	The Wednesday	Wolverhampton
	Wykes; Fletcher			Stadium: Dudley Road; Attendance: 10,000

16 March 1889 SF	Wolverhampton Wanderers	1–1	Blackburn Rovers	Crewe
	Wykes			Stadium: Alexandra Road; Attendance: 15,000

23 March 1889 SF Rep.	Blackburn Rovers	1–3	Wolverhampton Wanderers	Crewe
			Hunter; Allen; Wood	Stadium: Alexandra Road; Attendance: 9,000

30 March 1889 Final	Preston North End	3–0	Wolverhampton Wanderers	London
	Dewhurst 15'; Ross 25'; Thomson 70'			Stadium: Kennington Oval; Attendance: 22,250; Referee: Francis Marindin

== Players ==
Pos.	Name	League		FA Cup		Total	
Pos.	Name	Apps	Goals	Apps	Goals	Apps	Goals
HB	(England) Harry Allen	22	0	6	1	28	1
FW	(England) Nick Anderson	2	0	0	0	2	0
FB	(England) Dickie Baugh	22	0	6	0	28	0
GK	(England) Jack Baynton	18	0	6	0	24	0
HB	(England) John Benton	1	0	0	0	1	0
FW	(England) John Brodie	18	11	4	1	22	12
HB	(England) Alec Cannon	7	0	2	0	9	0
FW	(England) Joe Cooper	21	6	0	0	21	6
HB	(England) R. Dudley	1	0	0	0	1	0
HB	(England) Albert Fletcher	16	1	6	1	22	2
FW	(England) Tommy Hunter	20	4	6	2	26	6
FW	(England) Tommy Knight	17	7	6	5	23	12
HB	(England) Arthur Lowder	18	1	6	1	24	2
FB	(England) Charlie Mason	20	0	6	1	26	1
GK	(England) William Rose	4	0	0	0	4	0
FW	(England) T. Tomkyes	1	0	0	0	1	0
FW	(England) Walter White	4	2	0	0	4	2
FW	(England) Harry Wood	17	13	6	1	23	14
FW	(England) David Wykes	18	4	6	3	24	7
