= 1889 FA Cup final =

1889 FA Cup Final
- Event: 1888–89 FA Cup
| Preston North End | Wolverhampton Wanderers |
| 3 | 0 |
- Date: 30 March 1889
- Venue: Kennington Oval, London
- Referee: Francis Marindin
- Attendance: 27,000

The 1889 FA Cup final was contested by Preston North End and Wolverhampton Wanderers at the Kennington Oval.

Preston won 3–0, with goals by Fred Dewhurst, Jimmy Ross and Sam Thomson.

This completed the "Double" for the victors, Preston having already won the inaugural Football League title without losing a game, a feat which earned them the nickname "The Invincibles".

== Match details ==
30 March 1889

| Preston North End | 3–0 | Wolverhampton Wanderers |
|---|---|---|
| Dewhurst 15'; Ross 25'; Thomson 70' |

Kennington Oval, London
Attendance: 27,000
Referee: Major Francis Marindin

| Preston N.E. | W. Wanderers |

| GK | Robert Mills-Roberts |
| DF | Bob Howarth |
| DF | Bob Holmes |
| MF | George Drummond |
| MF | David Russell |
| MF | Johnny Graham |
| FR | Jack Gordon |
| FW | Jimmy Ross |
| FW | John Goodall |
| FW | Fred Dewhurst (c) |
| FL | Sammy Thomson |
Manager:
William Sudell

| GK | Jack Baynton |
| DF | Dickie Baugh |
| DF | Charlie Mason |
| MF | Albert Fletcher |
| MF | Harry Allen |
| MF | Arthur Lowder |
| FR | Tommy Hunter |
| FW | David Wykes |
| FW | John Brodie (c) |
| FW | Harry Wood |
| FL | Tommy Knight |
Manager:
Jack Addenbrooke

== Route to the Final ==
=== Preston North End ===
Round 1: Bootle 0–3 Preston North End

Round 2: Grimsby Town 0–2 Preston North End

Quarter-final: Preston North End 2–0 Birmingham St George's

Semi-final: Preston North End 1–0 West Bromwich Albion

(at Bramall Lane)

=== Wolverhampton Wanderers ===
Round 1: Wolverhampton Wanderers 4–3 Old Carthusians

Round 2: Wolverhampton Wanderers 6–1 Walsall Town Swifts

Quarter-final: Wolverhampton Wanderers 5–0 Sheffield Wednesday

Semi-final: Wolverhampton Wanderers 1–1 Blackburn Rovers

(at Alexandra Ground, Crewe)

- Replay: Blackburn Rovers 1–3 Wolverhampton Wanderers

(at Alexandra Ground, Crewe)
