= 1896 FA Cup final =

1896 FA Cup Final
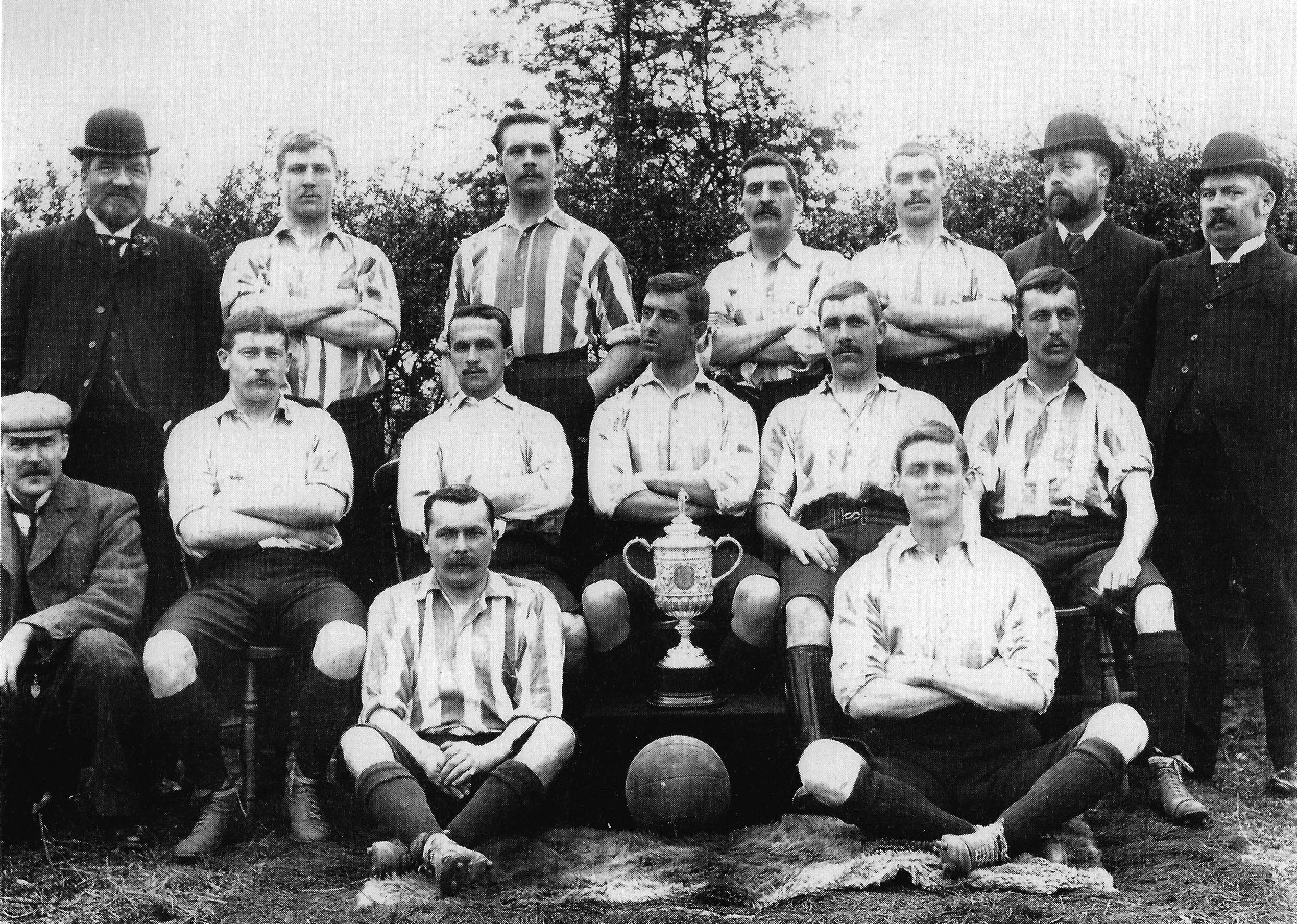
- The Wednesday players posing with the trophy
- Event: 1895–96 FA Cup
The Wednesday	Wolverhampton Wanderers
2	1
- Date: 18 April 1896
- Venue: Crystal Palace, London
- Referee: William Simpson
- Attendance: 48,836

The 1896 FA Cup final was the 25th. edition of the FA Cup finals, belonging to the 1895–96 FA Cup. It was won by The Wednesday at the Crystal Palace, in a victory over Wolverhampton Wanderers.

== Tournament format ==
Clubs competed for a new trophy, which remains the oldest surviving FA Cup trophy, although it was retired from use in 1910.

== Route to the Final ==
=== The Wednesday ===
Round 1: Southampton St. Mary's 2–3 The Wednesday

Round 2: The Wednesday 2–1 Sunderland

Quarter-final: The Wednesday 4–0 Everton

Semi-final: The Wednesday 1–1 Bolton Wanderers

(at Goodison Park)

- Replay: Bolton Wanderers 1–3 The Wednesday

(at Nottingham Forest)

=== Wolverhampton Wanderers ===
Round 1: Wolverhampton Wanderers 2–2 Notts County

- Replay: Notts County 3–4 Wolverhampton Wanderers

Round 2: Wolverhampton Wanderers 2–0 Liverpool

Quarter-final: Wolverhampton Wanderers 3–0 Stoke City

Semi-final: Wolverhampton Wanderers 2–1 Derby County

(at Villa Park)

== Match ==
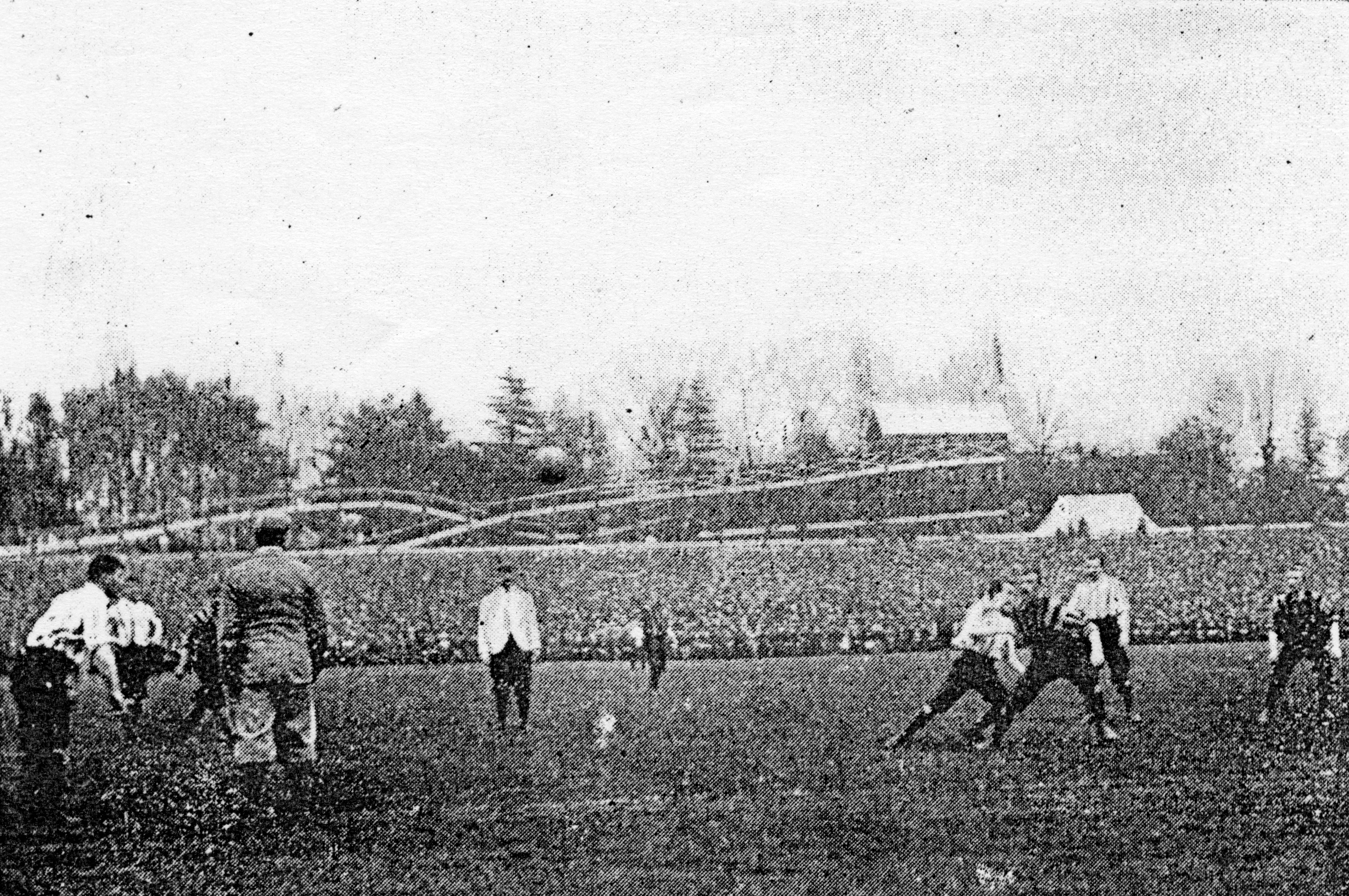
A moment of the match at Crystal Palace

Fred Spiksley became the star of the show in this Cup Final, scoring the two goals that gave the Wednesday a 2–1 win. Within the first minute, a run by Harry Davis, the outside-right, set up Spiksley to slot home the first. David Black soon equalised for Wolves with a cunning hook close to the post. Spiksley however smashed a shot against the upright which bounced into the goal and then out again. The referee gave a goal. The score stayed the same until the final whistle to give Wednesday their first FA Cup win.

== Match details ==
18 April 1896

The Wednesday	2–1	Wolverhampton Wanderers
Spiksley 1', 18'		Black 8'

Crystal Palace, London
Attendance: 48,836
Referee: William Simpson

The Wednesday	Wolverhampton Wanderers

GK	(England) Jimmy Massey
DF	(England) Jack Earp (c)
DF	(England) Ambrose Langley
MF	(Scotland) Harry Brandon
MF	(England) Tommy Crawshaw
MF	(Scotland) Bob Petrie
FW	(Scotland) Archie Brash
FW	(Scotland) Alec Brady
FW	(Scotland) Laurie Bell
FR	(England) Harry Davis
FL	(England) Fred Spiksley
Manager:
(England) Arthur Dickinson

GK	(England) Billy Tennant
DF	(England) Dickie Baugh
DF	(Scotland) Tommy Dunn
MD	(England) Billy Owen
MD	(England) Billy Malpass
MD	(England) Hill Griffiths
FW	(England) Jack Tonks
FW	(England) Charlie Henderson
FW	(England) Billy Beats
FR	(England) Harry Wood (c)
FL	(Scotland) David Black
Manager:
(England) Jack Addenbrooke
