= 1895–96 Swindon Town F.C. season =

Swindon Town
1895–96 season
- Chairman: Committee
- Ground: County Ground
- Southern League Div 1: 7th
- FA Cup: 3rd Qualifying Round
- Top goalscorer: League: Malcolm Sutherland (6); All: Malcolm Sutherland (10)
- Highest home attendance: 4,000 vs. Millwall Athletic; 19 October 1895; 4,000 vs. Reading; 21 March 1896
- Lowest home attendance: 1,200 vs. Warmley; 2 November 1895
Home colours

The 1895–96 season was Swindon Town's second season in the Southern League, the club's first season within a league structure. Swindon also competed in the FA Cup.

== Division One ==
Pos	Team	Pld	W	D	L	GF	GA	GR	Pts	Qualification or relegation
5	Chatham Town	18	9	2	7	43	45	0.956	20	
6	New Brompton	18	7	4	7	30	37	0.811	18	
7	Swindon Town	18	6	4	8	38	41	0.927	16	
8	Clapton	18	4	2	12	30	67	0.448	10	Relegation test matches, left league despite winning
9	Royal Ordnance Factories	18	3	3	12	23	44	0.523	9	Relegation test matches

Rules for classification: The system of using goal average to separate two teams tied on points was used until the 1976–77 season. The points system: 2 points for a win, 1 point for a draw and 0 points for losing.

== Results and matchday squads ==
=== Southern League Division One line-ups ===
Date	Opposition	V	Score	Goalkeeper	Outfield	Outfield	Outfield	Outfield	Outfield	Outfield	Outfield	Outfield	Outfield	Outfield
21/09/1895	Royal Ordnance Factories	A	2-1	Williams	Dibsdall	W.Richardson	Hopewell	Munro	Davies	Hames	Wright	Sutherland	D. Jones	Hayward

=== FA Cup line-ups ===
Date	Opposition	V	Score	Goalkeeper	Outfield	Outfield	Outfield	Outfield	Outfield	Outfield	Outfield	Outfield	Outfield	Outfield
12/10/1895	Trowbridge Town	A	3-1	Williams	Dibsdall	W. Richardson	Hopewell	Munro	Davies	Hames	Wright	Sutherland	D. Jones	Hayward
02/11/1895	Warmley	H	2-1	Williams	Dibsdall	W. Richardson	Hopewell	Munro	Davies	Hames	Wright	Sutherland	D. Jones	Hayward
23/11/1895	Uxbridge	A	0-5	Williams	Dibsdall	Reynolds	Hopewell	Munro	Davies	Hames	Wright	Sutherland	D. Jones	Hayward
