= Nick Anderson =

Nick Anderson may refer to:

== Arts and entertainment ==
- Nick Anderson (cartoonist), American cartoonist
- Nick Anderson (musician) (born 1995), American musician

== Sports ==
- Nick Anderson (gridiron football) (born 2000), American football player
- Nick Anderson (baseball) (born 1990), American baseball player
- Nick Anderson (basketball) (born 1968), American basketball player
- Nick Anderson (footballer) (1865–1921), English footballer

== Other ==
- Nick Anderson (chef), British chef

== See also ==
- Nicholas Anderson (disambiguation), a disambiguation page for "Nick Anderson"
- Nicky Andersen (born 1969), English footballer
