= Alec Cannon =

English footballer

Personal information
- Position: Half back

Senior career*
Years	Team	Apps	(Gls)
1888–1889	Wolverhampton Wanderers	7	(0)
- * Club domestic league appearances and goals

Alec Cannon was an English footballer who played in the Football League for Wolverhampton Wanderers.

Cannon was a reliable wing–half, who deputised for both Albert Fletcher and Arthur Lowder during his two seasons with Wolverhampton Wanderers.

== Early career ==
In his early career he played for Cannock Royal and Easington White Rose and joined Wolverhampton Wanderers in 1887.

== Season 1888–89 ==
Alec Cannon, playing as a winger, made his League debut on 8 September 1888, at Dudley Road, the then home of Wolverhampton Wanderers. The visitors were Aston Villa and the match ended as a 1–1 draw. Alec Cannon appeared in seven of the 22 League matches played by Wolverhampton Wanderers in season 1888–89 and as a winger/wing–half (seven appearances) was part of a midfield that achieved a big (three-League-goals-or-more) win on two occasions.

== 1889 onwards ==
Alec Cannon left Wolverhampton Wanderers in 1889 and joined Kidderminster Harriers or Kidderminster Olympic. Note: ENFA say Olympic and Matthews says Harriers. These clubs were great rivals and finished as Birmingham and District League Champions (Olympic) and runners–up (Harriers) in season 1889–90. Cannon later went on to assist Springhill Athletic. There appear to be no records for this club. Cannon retired in 1901.
