= 1893 FA Cup final =

1893 FA Cup Final
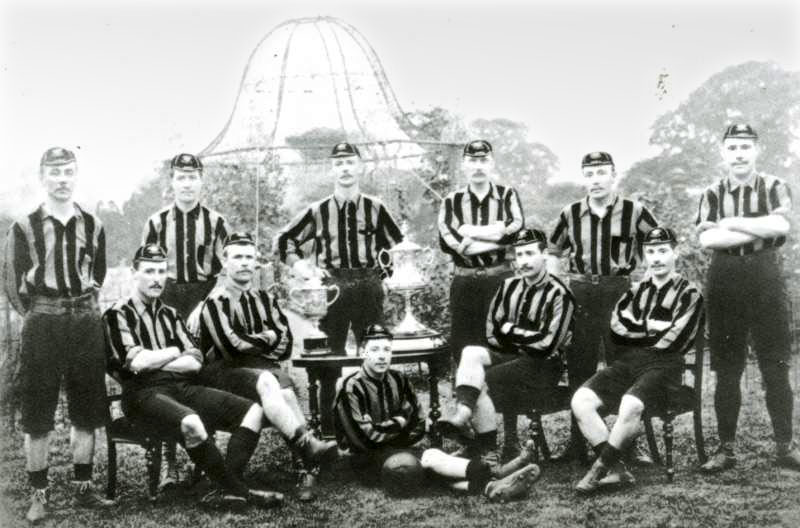
- The victorious Wolves team
- Event: 1892–93 FA Cup
Wolverhampton Wanderers	Everton
1	0
- Date: 25 March 1893
- Venue: Fallowfield Stadium, Manchester
- Referee: C. J. Hughes
- Attendance: 45,000 (official) c. 60,000 (estimate)

The 1893 FA Cup final was a football game contested by Wolverhampton Wanderers and Everton. Wolves won by a single goal, scored by Harry Allen.

This was the only time the final was staged at Fallowfield Stadium. Although the official attendance was 45,000, it is estimated that close to 60,000 spectators were actually in the ground. The overcrowding delayed the kick off and meant the pitch was often encroached upon during the game. Play was impeded so much that Everton, beaten 0–1, unsuccessfully demanded a replay afterwards, arguing the environment was not fit for a competitive match.

Everton had come into the match as favourites. Only a week earlier, they had sent their reserves to face Wolves in a league match to allow their first team time to rest before their semi-final replay. The reserves beat Wolves' Cup final team 4–2 at Molineux, boosting Everton's confidence.

== Route to the Final ==
=== Wolverhampton Wanderers ===
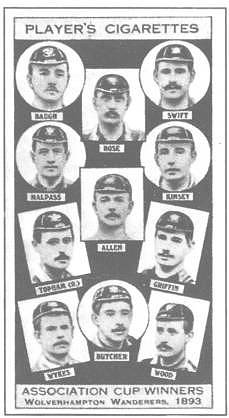
Wolverhampton Wanderers players displayed on a cigarette card

Round 1: Wolverhampton Wanderers 1–1 Bolton Wanderers

- Replay: Bolton Wanderers 1–2 Wolverhampton Wanderers

Round 2: Wolverhampton Wanderers 2–1 Middlesbrough

Quarter-final: Wolverhampton Wanderers 5–0 Darwen

Semi-final: Wolverhampton Wanderers 2–1 Blackburn Rovers

(at the Town Ground, Nottingham)

=== Everton ===
Round 1: Everton 4–1 West Bromwich Albion

Round 2: Everton 4–2 Nottingham Forest

Quarter-final: Everton 3–0 Sheffield Wednesday

Semi-final: Everton 2–2 Preston North End

(at Bramall Lane)

- Replay: Everton 0–0 Preston North End

(at Bramall Lane)

- Replay: Everton 2–1 Preston North End

(at Ewood Park)

== Match summary ==
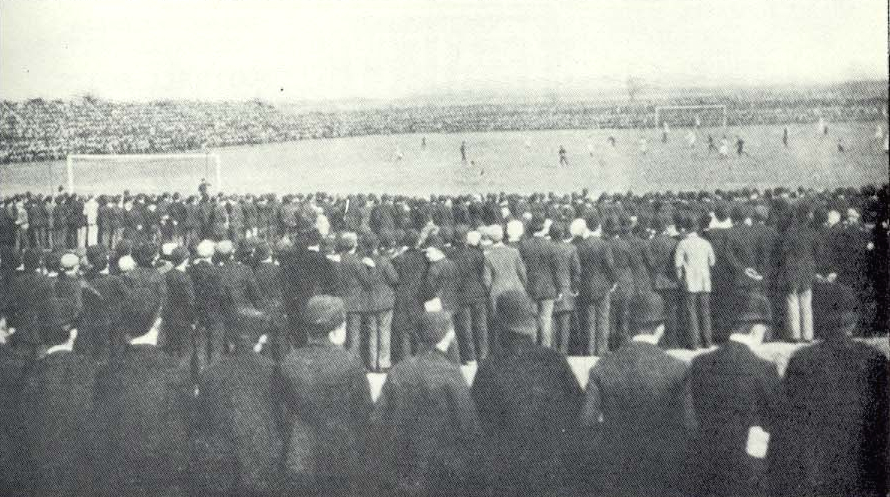
The match in progress

Everton dominated the first half but saw their wingers hindered by the stray feet of the encroaching spectators on the touchline. To counteract this obstruction, both sides began to resort to a long ball game through the centre of the field. This tactic failed to provide any goals in the opening 45 minutes.

As the second half progressed, Everton began to tire, perhaps feeling the effects of 4 games in 10 days. On the hour mark, Wolves captain Harry Allen launched a hopeful lob from distance, which was misjudged by Williams and allowed to bounce into the net. Everton complained that the crowd had impeded their attempts to clear the ball, thus presenting Allen with the opportunity in the first place.

At the final whistle, the crowd invaded the pitch to mob the victorious Wolves players who had claimed their club's first ever FA Cup triumph.

== Match details ==
1892–93 FA Cup Final
25 March 1893

Wolverhampton Wanderers	1–0	Everton
Allen 60'

Fallowfield Stadium.
Attendance: 45,000
Referee: C. J. Hughes

W. Wanderers	Everton

GK	(England) Billy Rose
DF	(England) Dickie Baugh
DF	(England) George Swift
MF	(England) Billy Malpass
MF	(England) Harry Allen (c)
MF	(England) George Kinsey
FW	(England) Robert Topham
FW	(England) David Wykes
FW	(England) Joe Butcher
FW	(England) Harry Wood
FW	(England) Arthur Griffin
Manager:
(England) Jack Addenbrooke

GK	(England) Richard Williams
DF	(England) Bob Howarth (c)
DF	(Scotland) Bob Kelso
MF	(Scotland) Dickie Boyle
MF	(England) Johnny Holt
MF	(Scotland) Alec Stewart
FW	(Scotland) Alex Latta
FW	(Scotland) Patrick Gordon
FW	(Scotland) Alan Maxwell
FW	(England) Edgar Chadwick
FW	(England) Alf Milward
Manager:
(England) Dick Molyneux
