= Joe Butcher =

English footballer

Personal information
- Full name: Joseph Henry Butcher
- Date of birth: 13 February 1875
- Place of birth: Willenhall, Staffordshire, England
- Date of death: 1945 (aged 69–70)
- Position: Forward

Senior career*
Years	Team	Apps	(Gls)
–1892	Wolverhampton East End		
1892–1895	Wolverhampton Wanderers	65	(26)
	West Bromwich Albion	0	(0)
- * Club domestic league appearances and goals

Joseph Henry Butcher (13 February 1875 – 1945) was an English footballer who played in the Football League for Wolverhampton Wanderers, with whom he won the 1893 FA Cup.

== Career ==
Butcher began his career with amateur side Wolverhampton East End, before joining the city's Football League side Wolverhampton Wanderers in 1892. He made his club debut on 24 September 1892 when he scored in a 3–0 victory over Notts County. In only his fifth appearance for the club, he netted all five goals in a 5–3 win against Accrington, a club record never bettered.

He was a member of Wolves' 1893 FA Cup winning team, playing in the 1–0 triumph against Everton that won the club their first FA Cup. Butcher had previously scored goals in both the quarter-final and semi-final to help them to the showpiece final.

The forward was Wolves' leading goalscorer in the 1893-94 season, with 14 goals, but the next campaign was an injury-hampered one and he only managed two further goals for the club. He scored a total of 30 goals in 76 appearances.

He joined local rivals and fellow First Division side, West Bromwich Albion, in Summer 1895. However, he suffered a career-ending injury before he was able to make his first team debut. This forced him into a premature playing retirement aged 21.

A copy of his contract was buried in a time capsule along with Steve Bull's during the redevelopment of Molineux in 1994.
