= John Benton =

John Benton may refer to:

- Sergeant Benton, a fictional character in the British science fiction television series Doctor Who, played by John Levene
- John Benton (curler) (born 1969), American curler
- John Benton (footballer) (1865–1932), English footballer who played for Wolverhampton Wanderers
- John F. Benton (1931–1988), professor of history at the California Institute of Technology
- John Benton (American football) (born 1963), American football coach
