= James Massey (disambiguation) =

James Massey (1934–2013) was an information theorist.

James or Jimmy Massey is also the name of:

- Jimmy Massey (1929–2015), NASCAR driver
- Jimmy Massey (footballer) (1869–1960), English football player
