= Bill Allan =

Scottish footballer (1870–1948)

Personal information
- Full name: William Allan
- Date of birth: 26 August 1870
- Place of birth: Montrose, Scotland
- Date of death: 1948 (aged 77–78)
- Place of death: Newcastle upon Tyne, England
- Position: Goalkeeper

Senior career*
Years	Team	Apps	(Gls)
- Montrose
- Orion
1890–1891	Victoria United		
1891–1896	Sheffield Wednesday	102	(0)
1897–1898	Victoria United		
1898–1899	Millwall Athletic		
1899–1900	Montrose		
- * Club domestic league appearances and goals

William Allan (26 August 1870 – 1948) was a Scottish footballer who played as a goalkeeper in the English Football League for Sheffield Wednesday. He was the Owls regular goalkeeper for their first three seasons in the league, but lost his place to Jimmy Massey and took no part in the winning run to the 1895–96 FA Cup, having already departed at the start of 1896.
