= Nicholas Anderson =

Nicholas Anderson may refer to:

- Nicholas Anderson (rower) (born 1975), American rower
- Nicholas Longworth Anderson (1838–1892), U.S. Army officer
- Nicholas Anderson (politician) (1856–1919), American businessman, farmer, and politician in Wisconsin
- Nicholas Anderson (figure skater) in 2009–2010 figure skating season

== See also ==
- Nick Anderson (disambiguation)
