= Archie Brash =

Scottish footballer

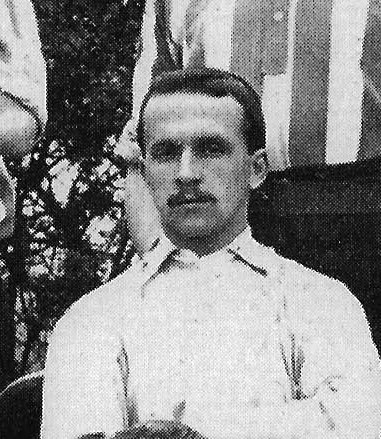

Personal information
- Full name: Archibald Taylor Brash
- Date of birth: 18 January 1873
- Place of birth: Uphall, Scotland
- Date of death: 19 November 1942 (aged 69)
- Place of death: Gorbals, Glasgow, Scotland
- Position: Winger

Senior career*
Years	Team	Apps	(Gls)
1892–1894	St Mirren	32	(14)
1894–1898	Sheffield Wednesday	93	(14)
1898–1899	Crewe Alexandra		
1899–1900	Sheffield Wednesday	26	(6)
1900–1901	Leicester Fosse	14	(5)
1901–1903	Aberdeen (1881)		
- * Club domestic league appearances and goals

Archibald Taylor Brash (18 January 1873 – 19 November 1942) was a Scottish footballer.

Brash was a diminutive right winger who signed for Sheffield Wednesday in July 1894 from St Mirren. He was a standout player for Wednesday, helping the team take the 1896 F.A. Cup trophy. However, he was dismissed from the team for drunkenness in 1898 after warnings from the executive went unheeded.

He immediately joined Crewe Alexandra before returning to Wednesday after a second chance. At Wednesday, he continued to struggle with alcoholism but was dried out before the F.A. season, when he was locked in the clubhouse to keep him sober. He was sold to Leicester Fosse in June 1900 for £110, but did not live up to his big reputation, with his drinking leading to another dismissal.

In March 1901, Brash was summoned to Sheffield Criminal Court by his wife, Mary Ann, who accused him of physical abuse and cruelty, alleging he had repeatedly attacked her, spit on her, and threatened her. Mary Ann Brash testified that she would rather commit suicide than remain married to him, but her case was dismissed by the court.

In August 1901, Brash returned to Scotland to sign for Aberdeen, where he saw out his playing career.

He died in 1942 in Glasgow of heart and lung disease.
