= Jack Tonks =

English footballer

Personal information
- Full name: Joseph Tonks
- Date of birth: 26 October 1872
- Place of birth: Wednesfield, England
- Date of death: 1951 (aged 78–79)
- Position: Winger

Senior career*
Years	Team	Apps	(Gls)
1889–1890	Walsall Unity		
1890–1894	Walsall Town Swifts		
1894–1900	Wolverhampton Wanderers	106	(20)
1900	Walsall		
Total		106	(20)
- * Club domestic league appearances and goals

Joseph Tonks (26 October 1872 – 1951) was an English footballer who played in the Football League for Wolverhampton Wanderers. Tonks was a member of the Wolves team which lost 2–1 to The Wednesday in the 1896 FA Cup Final.
