= Tommy Hunter (footballer) =

English footballer (1863–1918)

Personal information
- Full name: Thomas Hunter
- Date of birth: 1863
- Place of birth: Walsall, England
- Date of death: 1918 (aged 55)
- Place of death: Kidderminster, England
- Position: Winger

Senior career*
Years	Team	Apps	(Gls)
1888–1889	Wolverhampton Wanderers	20	(4)
- * Club domestic league appearances and goals

Thomas Hunter (1863–1918) was an English footballer who played for Wolverhampton Wanderers in season 1888–89.

== Early career ==
Tommy Hunter signed for Walsall Town in 1884. He failed to establish himself with Walsall Town but, as he was strong–running utility forward he was signed by Wolverhampton Wanderers FC in August 1886. Note: Matthews claims Hunter was at Walsall Swifts. Walsall Town and Walsall Swifts played on the same ground and amalgamated in 1888.

Hunter made a fine start to his career with the Wanderers, scoring plenty of goals in the various friendly matches played by the club. He also claimed five goals in the FA Cup in his first season, including four–in–a match in a 14–0 win against Crosswell's Brewery on 13 November 1886.

== Season 1888–89 ==
Tommy Hunter, playing as one of the two winger' made his League debut on 8 September 1888, at Dudley Road, the then home of Wolverhampton Wanderers. The visitors were Aston Villa and the match ended in a 1–1 draw.

He scored his first League goal on 22 September 1888 at Dudley Road when the visitors were Burnley. Hunter scored the fourth of Wolverhampton Wanderer's four goals as they won the match 4–1.

Hunter appeared in 20 of the 22 League matches played by Wolverhampton Wanderers during the 1888–89 season and scored four goals. Playing as a winger (20 appearances) he was part of a midfield that achieved a big (three-League-goals-or-more) win on five occasions. He also played in the 1889 FA Cup Final as Wolverhampton Wanderers lost to Preston North End 3–0.

== 1889 onwards ==
Subsequently, released by Wolves in the summer of 1889 (after picking up a knee injury) he joined Kidderminster Olympic who went onto win the Birmingham & District League in season 1889–90. In 1890 the two Kidderminster clubs, Harriers and Olympic amalgamated to become Kidderminster. During the 1890–91 season Hunter returned to Walsall Town Swifts, (Note: Since Hunter left Town in 1886 Town and Swifts had amalgamated to form Walsall Town Swifts). Hunter returned to Kidderminster Harriers in 1891. Kidderminster had found it financially unviable to remain a professional club and so returned to amateur status and returned to the Kidderminster Harriers name. Hunter became the player–manager of the Harriers and later served with Pelsall Villa (albeit only briefly) before retiring in April 1895. In 1901 Hunter became Chairman of Kidderminster Harriers, a position he held for a number of years. During his time on the Board he was also a licensee of both The Dolphin (first) and then the Cape of Good Hope. Afterwards Hunter ran a successful tobacconist shop in Kidderminster. He died at the age of 55 in 1918 of Spanish flu. He played 35 first–team matches for Wolves (20 in the League) and scored 13 goals (Four League goals).
