= Walter White (English footballer) =

English footballer

Personal information
- Full name: Walter White
- Date of birth: 1864
- Place of birth: Wolverhampton, England
- Position: Forward

Senior career*
Years	Team	Apps	(Gls)
- Coombs Wood
1888–1889	Wolverhampton Wanderers	4	(2)
- Cradley Heath St Luke's
- * Club domestic league appearances and goals

Walter White (1864 – after 1889) was an English footballer who played in the Football League for Wolverhampton Wanderers.

Born in Halesowen in 1864, he played for Coombs Wood FC from 1887 to 1888 before joining Wolverhampton Wanderers in readiness for that initial League campaign of 1888–89.

Walter White, playing as a forward, made his League debut on 8 September 1888, at Dudley Road, the then home of Wolverhampton Wanderers. The visitors were Aston Villa and the match ended as a 1–1 draw. Walter White scored his debut League goal on 22 September 1888 at Dudley Road against Burnley. Wolverhampton Wanderers won the match 4–1, White scoring the first and third of Wolverhampton Wanderers' four goals. White appeared in four of the 22 League matches played by Wolverhampton Wanderers during the 1888–89 season. Playing as a forward (four appearances), was part of a forward-line that scored three–League–goals–or–more–in–a–match once.

White was not able to establish himself in the first XI and was released by the club in April 1890, when he teamed up with Cradley St. Luke's FC. White played four times for Wolverhampton Wanderers and scored two goals, all in League matches. The date of his decease and where it happened are not known.
