= Joe Cooper (footballer, born 1865) =

English footballer

Personal information
- Full name: Joseph Cooper
- Date of birth: 1865
- Place of birth: Wolverhampton, England
- Position: Forward

Senior career*
Years	Team	Apps	(Gls)
- Milton
1888–1890	Wolverhampton Wanderers	24	(6)
1893	Woolwich Arsenal	6	(0)
- * Club domestic league appearances and goals

Joe Cooper, also known as Joseph Cooper, also known as Jeremiah Cooper (born 1865) was an English footballer who played for Wolverhampton Wanderers and Woolwich Arsenal. Joseph Cooper was a strong running inside–forward always running for the ball.

== Early career ==
Became a Youth Player in 1880 however, it is not known what football Cooper played as a youth. In 1886, now a senior player he signed for Milton FC. Milton FC was a small club based in a village north of Stoke-on-Trent. Cooper played for Milton from 1886 to 1888 and was then signed by Wolverhampton Wanderers.

== Season 1888–89 ==
Joseph Cooper, playing as one of the three forwards, made his League debut on 8 September 1888, at Dudley Road, the then home of Wolverhampton Wanderers. The visitors were Aston Villa and the match ended as a 1–1 draw.

Joseph Cooper, playing as one of the three forwards, scored his debut League goal on 29 September 1888 at Dudley Road. The visitors were Blackburn Rovers. The match ended as a 2–2 draw and Joseph Cooper scored the first of Wolverhampton Wanderers two goals.

Joseph Cooper appeared in 21 of the 22 League matches played by Wolverhampton Wanderers in season 1888–89 and, as a forward (20 appearances), was part of a forward-line that scored three–League–goals–or–more–in–a–match on eight separate occasions. In scoring six League goals in a season Cooper scored two–League–goals–in–a–match once, against Accrington, on 8 December 1888 at Dudley Road. Wolverhampton Wanderers won the match 4–0.

== 1889 onwards ==
Cooper only played three League matches in seasons 1889–90 and 1890–91 and this was because of a serious ankle injury. He left Molineux, Wolverhampton Wanderers home from 1889, in 1891 and joined a local team, Stourbridge Standard. However, Woolwich Arsenal signed him in 1893–94 and he played six Division Two League matches and a couple of FA Cup ties, scoring two goals in the latter.
