= Albert Fletcher (footballer, born 1867) =

English footballer (1867–1940)

Personal information
- Full name: Albert Thomas Fletcher
- Date of birth: 4 June 1867
- Place of birth: Nottingham, England
- Date of death: 1940 (aged 72–73)
- Position: Right half

Senior career*
Years	Team	Apps	(Gls)
1885–1886	Willenhall Pickwick		
1886–1893	Wolverhampton Wanderers	59	(1)

International career
1889–1890	England	2	(0)
- * Club domestic league appearances and goals

Albert Thomas Fletcher (4 June 1867 – 1940) was an English international footballer who played as a right half.

== Early life ==
Born in Wolverhampton, Fletcher was described as a man who was huge in both body and spirit, a real "man mountain" who nevertheless possessed a great deal of skill.

== Career ==
He signed for Willenhall Pickwick in 1885.

In 1886 Fletcher signed for Wolverhampton Wanderers when Jack Addenbrooke paid a golden sovereign for his signature from Willenhall Pickwick. Wolverhampton Wanderers joined the Football League two years after Fletcher joined the club.

Fletcher, playing as one of the two wing-halves made his League debut on 8 September 1888, at Dudley Road, the then home of Wolverhampton Wanderers. The visitors were Aston Villa and the match ended in a 1–1 draw. At the time he was 21 years 96 days old; which made him, on the first weekend of League football, Wolverhampton Wanderers' youngest player. This was surpassed one week later by David Wykes.

He scored his first and only League goal on 6 October 1888 at Thorneyholme Road, the home of Accrington. Fletcher scored the third of Wolverhampton Wanderers four goals. The match ended as a 4–4 draw.

Fletcher appeared in 16 of the 22 League matches played by Wolverhampton Wanderers during the 1888–89 season. Playing at wing—half (16 appearances) was part of a midfield that achieved a big (three—League—goals—or—more) win on four separate occasions. He also played in the 1889 FA Cup Final as Wolverhampton Wanderers lost to Preston North End 3–0.

Fletcher made 42 League appearances over the next two seasons. He also won two England caps in 1889 and 1890 when selected to play against Wales on both occasions.

He broke his leg in a match against Aston Villa and did not play during the 1891–92 season. He attempted a comeback during the 1892–93 season, but only played in one more League match, before retiring as a player. He made 120 first-team appearances for Wolves, of which 58 were Football League matches.

== Later life ==
After retirement, Fletcher remained at Molineux, the new home of Wolverhampton Wanderers (opened in 1889) and became an Assistant Trainer. In 1896 he replaced Chief Trainer Jack Lewis. He finally retired from Wolverhampton Wanderers in 1920.
