= George Swift (footballer) =

English footballer (1870–1956)

Personal information
- Full name: George Harold Swift
- Date of birth: 3 February 1870
- Place of birth: Oakengates, Shropshire, England
- Date of death: 1956 (aged 85–86)
- Position: Full-back

Youth career
- St George's Swifts
- Wellington Town
- Wellington St George's

Senior career*
Years	Team	Apps	(Gls)
- Stoke
- Crewe Alexandra
1891–1894	Wolverhampton Wanderers	59	(1)
1895–1896	Loughborough	26	(1)
1896–1902	Leicester Fosse	186	(5)
1902–1905	Notts County	16	(0)
1905–1906	Leeds City	1	(0)

Managerial career
- 1907–1910: Chesterfield
- 1911–1912: Southampton
- * Club domestic league appearances and goals

George Harold Swift (3 February 1870 – 1956) was an English footballer who won the FA Cup with Wolverhampton Wanderers, and was later the first secretary-manager of Southampton.

== Playing career ==
Swift was born in Oakengates, Shropshire and spent his early club career with Stoke and Crewe Alexandra, before he joined Football League club Wolverhampton Wanderers in 1891. He made his Wolves debut on 14 September 1891 in a 5–0 win over Accrington, one of four appearances that season.

He was an ever-present in the 1892–93 season, which included the club winning their first ever FA Cup when they defeated Everton in the final. He moved to Loughborough after the subsequent season and later played at Leicester Fosse, Notts County and Leeds City before retiring in 1906.

He represented England against Ireland in the Inter-League match at the Victoria Ground, Stoke-on-Trent, in November 1895.

== Coaching and management career ==
=== Chesterfield ===
After retiring from playing, he became trainer at Leeds City where he stayed for two seasons. Swift had a good deal of influence on onfield activities and gave manager Gilbert Gillies great support before taking the post of manager at Chesterfield in summer 1907. He spent three years at Chesterfield, with no conspicuous success. In his first season in charge, Chesterfield finished second from bottom of Football League Second Division but were re-elected. The following season (1908–09) they finished in the same position but this time failed to be re-elected. There then followed a season in the Midland League, where Chesterfield were champions at the end of the 1909–10 season. Swift left Chesterfield in May 1910 before moving south to become secretary-manager at The Dell in April 1911.

=== Southampton ===
Prior to Swift's appointment, the Saints had been "managed" by the board under the company secretary, Er Arnfield, with Bill Dawson as trainer. The board had made a concerted effort to find a manager who could end the team's dreadful run of form (which had seen them drop to 17th place in the Southern League at the end of the 1910–11 season), and interviewed 140 applicants.

Following the appointment of Swift, Dawson (who had been trainer for seventeen years) resigned and Arnfield moved to financial secretary. In the first six weeks of Swift's brief reign he spent £820 recruiting eleven new players. Unfortunately, the appointment of a full-time manager failed to stop the rot and the 1911–12 season was another disappointment with the team finishing in 16th place, resulting in Swift's resignation.

== Honours ==
=== Player ===
Wolverhampton Wanderers

- FA Cup: 1893
