= Hill Griffiths =

English footballer

Personal information
- Full name: Hillary Griffiths
- Date of birth: 1871
- Place of birth: Wednesfield, England
- Date of death: 1937 (aged 65–66)
- Position: Wing half

Senior career*
Years	Team	Apps	(Gls)
1888–1889	Wednesfield Rovers		
1890–1900	Wolverhampton Wanderers	181	(1)
Total		181	(1)
- * Club domestic league appearances and goals

Hillary Griffiths (1871–1937) was an English footballer who played in the Football League for Wolverhampton Wanderers with whom he played in the 1896 FA Cup Final.
