= 1892–93 FA Cup =

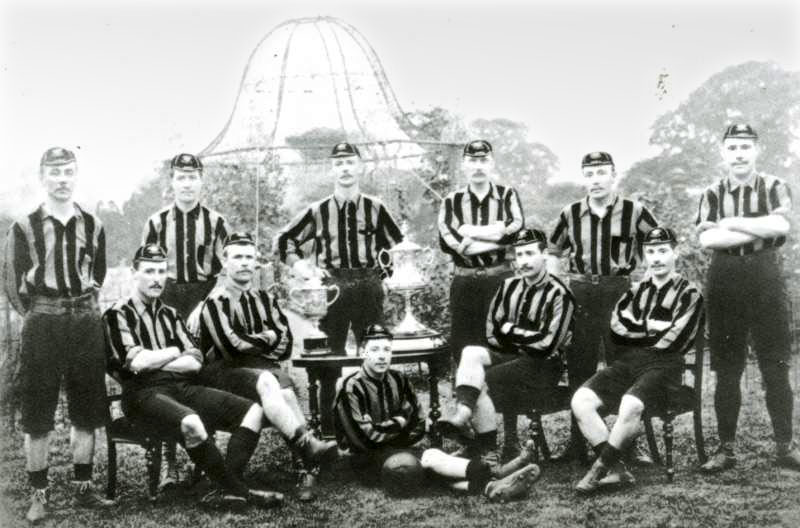
- Wolverhampton Wanderers following their FA Cup victory

Tournament details
- Country: England; Wales

Final positions
- Champions: Wolverhampton Wanderers (1st title)
- Runners-up: Everton

The 1892–93 FA Cup was the 22nd staging of the world's oldest football cup competition, the Football Association Challenge Cup, commonly known as the FA Cup. Wolverhampton Wanderers won the competition, beating Everton 1–0 in the final at Fallowfield Stadium for the only time (moved from Kennington Oval), with Wembley Stadium still 30 years away from being built. Wolves continued the recent Midlands dominance of the FA Cup, after the success of West Brom, Aston Villa and Nottingham Forest the previous season.

Matches were scheduled to be played at the stadium of the team named first on the date specified for each round, which was always a Saturday. Some matches, however, might be rescheduled for other days if there were clashes with games for other competitions or the weather was inclement. If scores were level after 90 minutes had been played, a replay would take place at the stadium of the second-named team later the same week. If the replayed match was drawn further replays would be held until a winner was determined. If scores were level after 90 minutes had been played in a replay, a 30-minute period of extra time would be played.

== Calendar ==
| Round | Date | No. of teams |
|---|---|---|
| Preliminary round | Saturday 1 October 1892 | 10 |
| First qualifying round | Saturday 15 October 1892 | 160 |
| Second qualifying round | Saturday 29 October 1892 | 80 |
| Third qualifying round | Saturday 19 November 1892 | 40 |
| Fourth qualifying round | Saturday 10 December 1892 | 20 |
| First round proper | Saturday 21 January 1893 | 32 |
| Second round proper | Saturday 4 February 1893 | 16 |
| Third round proper | Saturday 18 February 1893 | 8 |
| Semi-finals | Saturday 4 March 1893 | 4 |
| Final | Saturday 25 March 1893 | 2 |

== Qualifying rounds ==
This season saw the introduction of the Football League Second Division and the further expansion of the First Division from 14 teams to 16. As a result of this, only the First Division teams plus Darwen, Small Heath and Sheffield United from the Second Division were exempted through to the first round proper of the FA Cup. Of the remaining Second Division sides, Ardwick was entered in the preliminary round (losing to Fleetwood Rangers) while Crewe Alexandra, Bootle, Lincoln City, Burslem Port Vale, Burton Swifts, Grimsby Town, Northwich Victoria and Walsall Town Swifts were entered in the first qualifying round.

In the end only Burton Swifts, Grimsby Town and Northwich Victoria reached the competition proper, and they were joined by non-League sides Stockton, Shankhouse, Loughborough, Blackpool, Woolwich Arsenal, Marlow and Casuals. Stockton and Loughborough were featuring at this stage for the first time, with Loughborough never getting past the qualifying rounds again despite spending five seasons in the Football League from 1895.

To bring the number of teams in the first round up to 32, the FA awarded byes to this stage to Middlesbrough Ironopolis, Middlesbrough and Newcastle East End, the three clubs that had been unsuccessful in the Football League elections held during the 1892 close-season. However, by the time the first round matches were played in January 1893, Newcastle East End had taken over the assets of their defunct rival Newcastle West End and changed their name to Newcastle United.

== Results ==
=== First round proper ===
| Tie No. | Home team | Score | Away team | Date |
|---|---|---|---|---|
| 1 | Blackpool | 1–3 | Sheffield United | 21 January 1893 |
| 2 | Darwen | 5–4 | Aston Villa | 21 January 1893 |
| 3 | Burnley | 2–0 | Small Heath | 21 January 1893 |
| 4 | Preston North End | 9–2 | Burton Swifts | 21 January 1893 |
| 5 | Marlow | 1–3 | Middlesbrough Ironopolis | 21 January 1893 |
| 6 | Notts County | 4–0 | Shankhouse | 21 January 1893 |
| 7 | Nottingham Forest | 4–0 | Casuals | 21 January 1893 |
| 8 | Blackburn Rovers | 4–0 | Newton Heath | 21 January 1893 |
| 9 | The Wednesday | 3–2 Match void | Derby County | 21 January 1893 |
| Replay | Derby County | 1–0 Match void | The Wednesday | 30 January 1893 |
| Replay | The Wednesday | 4–2 | Derby County | 2 February 1893 |
| 10 | Bolton Wanderers | 1–1 | Wolverhampton Wanderers | 21 January 1893 |
| Replay | Wolverhampton Wanderers | 2–1 | Bolton Wanderers | 28 January 1893 |
| 11 | Accrington | 2–1 | Stoke | 21 January 1893 |
| 12 | Grimsby Town | 5–0 | Stockton | 21 January 1893 |
| 13 | Sunderland | 6–0 | Royal Arsenal | 21 January 1893 |
| 14 | Everton | 4–1 | West Bromwich Albion | 21 January 1893 |
| 15 | Loughborough | 1–2 | Northwich Victoria | 21 January 1893 |
| 16 | Newcastle United | 2–3 | Middlesbrough | 21 January 1893 |

=== Second round proper ===
| Tie No. | Home team | Score | Away team | Date |
|---|---|---|---|---|
| 1 | Darwen | 2–0 | Grimsby Town | 4 February 1893 |
| 2 | Blackburn Rovers | 4–1 | Northwich Victoria | 4 February 1893 |
| 3 | The Wednesday | 1–0 | Burnley | 4 February 1893 |
| 4 | Accrington | 1–4 | Preston North End | 4 February 1893 |
| 5 | Wolverhampton Wanderers | 2–1 | Middlesbrough | 4 February 1893 |
| 6 | Everton | 4–2 | Nottingham Forest | 4 February 1893 |
| 7 | Sheffield United | 1–3 | Sunderland | 4 February 1893 |
| 8 | Middlesbrough Ironopolis | 3–2 | Notts County | 4 February 1893 |

=== Third round proper ===
| Tie No. | Home team | Score | Away team | Date |
|---|---|---|---|---|
| 1 | Preston North End | 2–2 | Middlesbrough Ironopolis | 18 February 1893 |
| Replay | Middlesbrough Ironopolis | 0–7 | Preston North End | 25 February 1893 |
| 2 | Blackburn Rovers | 3–0 | Sunderland | 18 February 1893 |
| 3 | Wolverhampton Wanderers | 5–0 | Darwen | 18 February 1893 |
| 4 | Everton | 3–0 | The Wednesday | 18 February 1893 |

=== Semi-finals ===
| Tie No. | Home team | Score | Away team | Date |
|---|---|---|---|---|
| 1 | Wolverhampton Wanderers | 2–1 | Blackburn Rovers | 4 March 1893 |
| 2 | Everton | 2–2 | Preston North End | 4 March 1893 |
| Replay | Preston North End | 0–0 | Everton | 16 March 1893 |
| Replay | Everton | 2–1 | Preston North End | 20 March 1893 |

=== Final ===
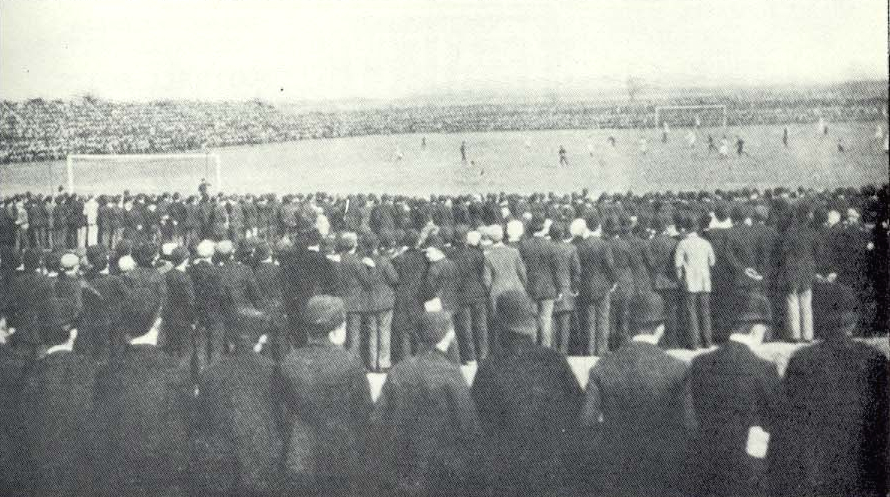
The 1893 FA Cup Final between Woves and Everton.

The Final was played on 25 March 1893 at Fallowfield Stadium. The final was contested by Wolverhampton Wanderers and Everton. Wolves won 1–0, with a single goal from Harry Allen.

==== Match details ====
25 March 1893

| Wolverhampton Wanderers | 1 – 0 | Everton |
|---|---|---|
| Allen 60' |

Fallowfield Stadium
Attendance: 45,000
Referee: C.J. Hughes (Northwich)
