= 1895–96 in English football =

Football in England
- Season: 1895–96

Men's football
- First Division: Aston Villa
- Second Division: Liverpool
- Northern League: Darlington
- Midland League: Kettering
- Southern League: Millwall Athletic
- FA Cup: The Wednesday
- FA Amateur Cup: Bishop Auckland

The 1895–96 season was the 25th season of competitive football in England.

== Events ==
Loughborough replaced Walsall Town Swifts in the Second Division.

== Honours ==
Competition	Winner
First Division	Aston Villa (2)
Second Division	Liverpool
FA Cup	The Wednesday (1)
Home Championship	Scotland

Notes = Number in parentheses is the times that club has won that honour. * indicates new record for competition

== League table ==
=== First Division ===
Pos	Team	Pld	W	D	L	GF	GA	GAv	Pts	Relegation
1	Aston Villa (C)	30	20	5	5	78	45	1.733	45	
2	Derby County	30	17	7	6	68	35	1.943	41	
3	Everton	30	16	7	7	66	43	1.535	39	
4	Bolton Wanderers	30	16	5	9	49	37	1.324	37	
5	Sunderland	30	15	7	8	52	41	1.268	37	
6	Stoke	30	15	0	15	56	47	1.191	30	
7	The Wednesday	30	12	5	13	44	53	0.830	29	
8	Blackburn Rovers	30	12	5	13	40	50	0.800	29	
9	Preston North End	30	11	6	13	44	48	0.917	28	
10	Burnley	30	10	7	13	48	44	1.091	27	
11	Bury	30	12	3	15	50	54	0.926	27	
12	Sheffield United	30	10	6	14	40	50	0.800	26	
13	Nottingham Forest	30	11	3	16	42	57	0.737	25	
14	Wolverhampton Wanderers	30	10	1	19	61	65	0.938	21	
15	Small Heath (R)	30	8	4	18	39	79	0.494	20	Qualification for test matches
16	West Bromwich Albion (O)	30	6	7	17	30	59	0.508	19	Qualification for test matches

Source: World Football
Rules for classification: 1) Points; 2) Goal average; 3) Goals scored
(C) Champions; (O) Play-off winners; (R) Relegated

=== Second Division ===
Pos	Team	Pld	W	D	L	GF	GA	GAv	Pts	Qualification or relegation
1	Liverpool (C, O, P)	30	22	2	6	106	32	3.313	46	Qualification for test matches
2	Manchester City	30	21	4	5	63	38	1.658	46	Qualification for test matches
3	Grimsby Town	30	20	2	8	82	38	2.158	42	
4	Burton Wanderers	30	19	4	7	69	40	1.725	42	
5	Newcastle United	30	16	2	12	73	50	1.460	34	
6	Newton Heath	30	15	3	12	66	57	1.158	33	
7	Woolwich Arsenal	30	14	4	12	58	42	1.381	32	
8	Leicester Fosse	30	14	4	12	57	44	1.295	32	
9	Darwen	30	12	6	12	72	67	1.075	30	
10	Notts County	30	12	2	16	57	54	1.056	26	
11	Burton Swifts	30	10	4	16	39	69	0.565	24	
12	Loughborough	30	9	5	16	40	66	0.606	23	
13	Lincoln City	30	9	4	17	53	75	0.707	22	
14	Burslem Port Vale (R)	30	7	4	19	43	78	0.551	18	Resigned from league
15	Rotherham Town	30	7	3	20	34	97	0.351	17	Resigned from league and folded
16	Crewe Alexandra (R)	30	5	3	22	30	95	0.316	13	Resigned from league

Rules for classification: 1) Points; 2) Goal average; 3) Goals scored
(C) Champions; (O) Play-off winners; (P) Promoted; (R) Relegated

=== Southern Football League ===
==== Division One ====
Pos	Team	Pld	W	D	L	GF	GA	GR	Pts	Qualification or relegation
1	Millwall Athletic	18	16	1	1	75	16	4.688	33	
2	Luton Town	18	13	1	4	68	14	4.857	27	Left to join the United League at end of season
3	Southampton St. Mary's	18	12	0	6	44	23	1.913	24	
4	Reading	18	11	1	6	45	38	1.184	23	
5	Chatham Town	18	9	2	7	43	45	0.956	20	
6	New Brompton	18	7	4	7	30	37	0.811	18	
7	Swindon Town	18	6	4	8	38	41	0.927	16	
8	Clapton	18	4	2	12	30	67	0.448	10	Relegation test matches, left league despite winning
9	Royal Ordnance Factories	18	3	3	12	23	44	0.523	9	Relegation test matches
10	Ilford	18	0	0	18	10	81	0.123	0	Relegation test matches, left league after losing

Rules for classification: The system of using goal average to separate two teams tied on points was used until the 1976–77 season. The points system: 2 points for a win, 1 point for a draw and 0 points for losing.

==== Division Two ====
Pos	Team	Pld	W	D	L	GF	GA	GR	Pts	Qualification or relegation
1	Wolverton LNWR	16	13	1	2	43	10	4.300	27	Promotion test matches
2	Sheppey United	16	11	3	2	60	19	3.158	25	Promotion test matches
3	1st Scots Guards	16	8	5	3	37	22	1.682	21	Promotion test matches
4	Uxbridge	16	9	1	6	28	23	1.217	19	
5	Old St.Stephen's	16	6	3	7	34	21	1.619	15	
6	Guildford	16	7	1	8	29	41	0.707	15	Left league at end of season
7	Maidenhead	16	4	1	11	20	49	0.408	9	
8	Chesham	16	2	3	11	15	48	0.313	7	
9	Bromley	16	2	2	12	16	49	0.327	6	Left league at end of season
10	Windsor & Eton	1	0	0	1	0	0	—	0	Resigned from league after one match, record expunged

Rules for classification: The system of using goal average to separate two teams tied on points was used until the 1976–77 season. The points system: 2 points for a win, 1 point for a draw and 0 points for losing.
