= Harry Wood (footballer, born 1868) =

English footballer (1868–1951)

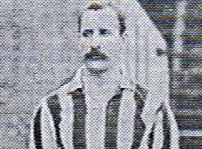
- Harry Wood in 1902

Personal information
- Full name: Harry Wood
- Date of birth: 26 June 1868
- Place of birth: Walsall, England
- Date of death: 7 July 1951 (aged 83)
- Place of death: Portsmouth, England
- Height: 5 ft 9 in (1.75 m)
- Position: Inside forward

Senior career*
Years	Team	Apps	(Gls)
1884–1885	Walsall Swifts		
1885–1891	Wolverhampton Wanderers	60	(35)
1891	Walsall Town Swifts		
1891–1898	Wolverhampton Wanderers	181	(74)
1898–1905	Southampton	158	(62)

International career
1890–1896	England	3	(1)
- * Club domestic league appearances and goals

Harry Wood (26 June 1868 – 5 July 1951) was an English professional footballer who played most of his career as an inside forward for Wolverhampton Wanderers and Southampton.

== Playing career ==
=== Wolverhampton Wanderers ===
A real gentleman, he was a model professional who played the game with great skill and enthusiasm. A pen–picture printed in 1889 described him as being "clever in ball manipulation and staidley exact distribution." He certainly gave the fans something to cheer about during his two spells with Wanderers. On leaving school Wood played briefly for Walsall Swifts, 1884–1885, joining Wolves in the summer of 1885 and making his senior debut for the Wanderers in an FA Cup tie against Derby St. Luke's on 31 October 1885. Playing as an inside–forward, he made his League debut on 6 October 1888, at Thorneyholme Road, the home of Accrington. Harry Wood also scored his debut League goal in this match when he scored to give Wolverhampton Wanderers a 2–0 lead. The match finished as a 4–4 draw. Harry Wood, when making his League debut was 20 years 102 days old; which made him, on the fifth weekend of League football, Wolverhampton Wanderers' youngest player in place of David Wykes. Harry Wood appeared in 17 of the 22 League matches played by Wolverhampton Wanderers in season 1888–89 scoring 13 goals. Harry Wood, playing as an inside–forward (17 appearances), was part of a Wolverhampton Wanderers forward–line that scored three League goals or more on eight separate occasions. Harry Wood appeared in all six FA Cup ties in season 1888–89, scoring in a semi-final reply and being on the losing side in the Final as Wolverhampton Wanderers lost 3–0 to Preston North End in the Final. Harry Wood top–scored for Wolverhampton Wanderers in season 1888–89. His 13 goals included a hat–trick scored in a 4–1 over Derby County at Dudley Road, the then home of Wolverhampton Wanderers. The date was 3 November 1888 and Wood's three was the first League hat–trick scored by a Wolverhampton Wanderers player. He also scored two in a match three times, at Turf Moor in a 4–0 win over Burnley, at Dudley Road in a 4–1 win over Stoke and again at Dudley Road in a 5–0 win over Everton

Wood's first spell at Wolves lasted six years, until July 1891 when he re–signed for Walsall Town Swifts. In his first spell Wood scored 46 goals (35 Football League) in 87 League and Cup matches for the Wanderers (60 League); He was also Wolves' top scorer in 1890–91 (jointly with Sammy Thomson). In his second he netted another 80 goals (74 League) in 202 appearances (181 League), he also top–scored in season 1892–93, finishing up with an impressive record of more than 125 goals in just under 300 first–team games.

He won three full England caps (1890–1896) and also represented the Football League. He starred in three FA Cup Finals with Wolves, those of 1889, 1893 and 1896, collecting a winners medal in his second against Everton when he led an exceptionally fine match. Wood made 289 appearances and scored 126 goals for Wolverhampton Wanderers.

=== Southampton ===
In the summer of 1898, Southampton's trainer, Bill Dawson, was on a short holiday in Stoke when he read in a local paper that Wood had not yet renewed the terms of his contract with Wolves. Dawson tracked Wood down to a Walsall pub and eventually persuaded Wood to sign for the Saints, who had just claimed the Southern League championship for the second consecutive year.

According to Holley & Chalk's The Alphabet of the Saints, "Harry Wood stands out as probably the most popular footballer to wear the Saints' colours during the Southern League era".

In his first season at The Dell Wood was an ever-present making 24 appearances and scoring 16 goals as Saints took the Southern League championship for the third time. The following season, Saints only managed third place in the league, but reached the FA cup final for the first time in their history, beating three First Division clubs along the way. Unfortunately, the Cup Final was a great disappointment as Saints were swept aside 4–0 by Bury.

In the following season, 1900–01, Saints once again took the Southern League title, with Wood scoring 10 goals and Edgar Chadwick top-scorer with 14 goals. The 1901–02 season followed a similar pattern to 1899–1900 with Saints finishing in third place and reaching their second FA Cup final, losing to Sheffield United after a replay.

In 1902–03, Saints won their sixth (and last) Southern League title with Wood only missing two games, scoring 12 goals. By now he was sharing the goal-scoring with John Fraser (15 goals), dab Fred Harrison (17 goals in only 13 games) and Joe Turner (14 goals).

Wood's cunning passing earned him the nickname "the wolf" and for seven years he captained the Saints during their most successful era. In all, he made 180 appearances for the Saints, scoring 65 goals.

In his final season at The Dell, the Saints played a testimonial match for Woods against Aston Villa. The "gate" money raised was £106 5s 6d which was boosted by donations from the Southampton public to make a total benefit cheque of £250 5s.

== After Southampton ==
After hanging up his boots, Wood was appointed trainer of Portsmouth, a position he held until 1912 when he became landlord of the Milton Arms public house, situated 200 yards from Fratton Park. Wood spent the rest of his life in Portsmouth, where he died on 5 July 1951 at the age of 83.

His son, Arthur Wood, also played for Southampton and Clapton Orient.

== Honours ==
Wolverhampton Wanderers

- FA Cup Winner: 1893
- FA Cup Finalist: 1889, 1896

Southampton

- FA Cup Finalist: 1900, 1902
- Southern League Championship: 1898–99, 1900–01, 1902–03, 1903–04
