= Town Ground (Nottingham) =

Football ground in Nottingham, England

- Interactive map of Town Ground
- Location: Nottingham, England
- Coordinates: 52.9384°N 1.1404°W
- Surface: Grass
- Record attendance: 15,000

Construction
- Opened: 2 October 1890
- Closed: 1898
- Cost: £1,000

Tenant
- Nottingham Forest

The Town Ground was a football ground in Nottingham in England. It was the home ground of Nottingham Forest, and the first ground to host a football match using crossbars and goal nets.

== History ==
In July 1890 Nottingham Forest bought "Councilor Woodward's Field", a site at the end of Arkwright Street, in order to build a new ground. The construction works cost £1,000; they included a covered 1,000-capacity stand with a standing area in front on the northern touchline, a large embankment with six steps running the whole length of the pitch on the southern touchline and an embankment with areas of uncovered seating at the western end. The ground was opened on 2 October in the 1890–91 season with a friendly match against Queen's Park, which Forest won 4–2 in front of 3,500 spectators.

In 1891 the Town Ground hosted a game between the North and the South, which was also the first match to be played using crossbars and goal nets. Forest were elected to the Football League in 1892, and the first League match at the ground was played on 10 September 1892, with Forest losing 4–3 to Stoke in front of 9,000 spectators. The ground was also used on three occasions in 1895 and 1896 by Notts County when their Trent Bridge ground was being used for cricket.

In the 1895–96 season the ground was one of the venues for the FA Cup semi-finals, with The Wednesday beating Bolton Wanderers 3–1. The record League attendance of 15,000 was set on 24 April 1897 for a promotion-relegation test match between Forest and Burnley. This was equalled on 4 September 1897 when Forest and Notts County played out a 1–1 draw in the Nottingham derby.

Forest moved to their new City Ground on 3 September 1898. The last League match at the Town Ground was a 3–1 win against Bury on 9 April 1898, watched by 6,000 spectators. The site was subsequently used for housing.
