= Tommy Knight (footballer) =

English footballer

Personal information
- Full name: Thomas Knight
- Date of birth: 1865
- Place of birth: Wolverhampton, England
- Position: Forward

Senior career*
Years	Team	Apps	(Gls)
1888–1890	Wolverhampton Wanderers	21	(8)
1890–1891	Willenhall		
1891–1892	Bilston		
1892–?	Darlaston		
- * Club domestic league appearances and goals

Thomas Knight (born 1865) was an English footballer who played for Wolverhampton Wanderers.

He preferred playing the inside-right berth. Knight joined Wolves at the age of 20/21 in August 1886 from Pickwick.

Tommy Knight, playing as a winger, made his League debut on 22 September 1888 at Dudley Road, the then home of Wolverhampton Wanderers. The visitors were Burnley who were defeated 4–1, Tommy Knight scoring the fifth and final goal of the match to put the home team 4–1 ahead. Tommy Knight appeared in 17 of the 22 League matches played by Wolverhampton Wanderers in season 1888–89 and scored seven League goals. Knight also played in all six of Wolverhampton Wanderers FA Cup ties scoring five goals in the early rounds. He appeared in the Final which was lost to Preston North End, 3–0. Playing as a winger (12 appearances) or wing–half (four appearances) Knight played in a Wolverhampton Wanderers midfield that achieved big (three–League–goals–or–more) wins on six occasions.

Knight stayed with the Wanderers until 1890, although his career came to an abrupt end on 28 September 1889 when he was injured playing at Stoke while occupying the right–back position (in an emergency). He made 33 appearances for Wolverhampton Wanderers (21 League) and scored 17 goals (eight League goals).

One source has Knight playing for Willenhall in 1890; Bilston in 1891 and Darlaston in 1892.
