= John Brodie (footballer, born 1862) =

English footballer (1862–1925

Personal information
- Full name: John Brant Brodie
- Date of birth: 30 August 1862
- Place of birth: Wightwick, England
- Date of death: 16 February 1925 (aged 62)
- Place of death: Wolverhampton, England
- Position: Forward

Senior career*
Years	Team	Apps	(Gls)
1877–1891	Wolverhampton Wanderers	42	(22)

International career
1889–1891	England	3	(1)
- * Club domestic league appearances and goals

John Brant Brodie (30 August 1862 – 16 February 1925), was an English footballer who was a pivotal figure in the formative years of Wolverhampton Wanderers.

== Early and personal life ==
Born on 30 August 1862 in Wightwick, Brodie was baptized on 6 October 1862 at St Peter's Church, Wolverhampton, as the eldest of three sons from the marriage of Henry Hugh, an iron moulder, and Eliza Brant.

On 9 April 1887, the 24-year-old Brodie married Eda Lockley at St. Luke's Church, Wolverhampton, with whom he had four children, John (1888), Harold (1892), and Phyllis (1896).

== Playing career ==
In 1877, the 15-year-old Brodie and John Baynton were among the founding members of the football club that became Wolverhampton Wanderers. The club was founded in 1877 as St. Luke's F.C. with John Baynton. The two were pupils of St Luke's Church School in Blakenhall, who had been presented with a football by their headmaster Harry Barcroft. The team played its first game on 13 January 1877 against a reserve side from Stafford Road, later merging with the football section of a local cricket club called Blakenhall Wanderers to form Wolverhampton Wanderers in August 1879.

Between 1880 and 1882, Brodie attended St Peter's teacher training and played for the Saltley College Football Club.

He played in Wolverhampton Wanderers' first-ever FA Cup tie in 1883, scoring the club's first FA Cup goal to help his side to a 4–1 win over Long Eaton Rangers. Some sources state that he was the first player to score more than 40 official goals in a single season (1883–84), including 39 goals in 17 matches for Wolverhampton in five different cup competitions and 2 goals in 4 games for a Birmingham selection. During this season, he captained the Wolves to a triumph at the 1884 Wrekin Cup, the club's first-ever trophy.

It is known that Brodie scored more than 100 goals in the pre-league era between 1882 and 1888, including 92 known goals for his club and 11 for regional selections of Birmingham and Staffordshire, thus possibly being the first footballer to have scored 100 goals in official games. Brodie also played in the Wolves' first-ever Football League match in September 1888, and later captained them in the 1889 FA Cup final, which ended in a 0–3 loss to league champions Preston North End. The following year, he scored a 5-goal haul against Stoke City in an 1889–90 FA Cup tie that Wolves was forced to replay after a protest. In October 1890, he scored his last goals for the club in a league fixture against Derby County. In total, he scored 44 goals in 65 matches for the club, including 22 goals in 42 league matches.

On 2 March 1889, Brodie made his international debut for England, already as captain, scoring once to help his side to a 6–1 win over Ireland at Anfield. In doing so, he became only the second Wolves player to gain international recognition as well as the first to captain England. His father died just 8 days later, on 10 March, a few weeks before the 1889 Cup final. He went on to earn a further two caps, against Scotland in 1890 and Ireland again in 1891.

== Later life ==
Having retired in 1891 due to a knee injury, Brodie and his wife became headmaster and mistress of a Wolverhampton primary school. He later returned to Wolves as a director.

According to both the 1901 and the 1911 United Kingdom census, Brodie was a headmaster at St. Peter's College, but on the latter occasion, he was already a widower, living with only his 15-year-old daughter Phyllis and a servant in Dean Street in Brewood. In late 1913, he married Judith Sarah Wills in London, but he then lost both his mother and his wife in 1916, as well as his eldest son John in 1920 in Niagara.

== Death ==
Brodie died at Penn Road, Penn Fields in Wolverhampton, on 16 February 1925, at the age of 62.

== Bibliography ==
- Matthews, Tony (2006). The Legends of Wolverhampton Wanderers. Derby: Breedon Books. p. 35. ISBN 1-85983-518-X.
