= Nick Anderson (footballer) =

English footballer (1865–??)

Personal information
- Full name: Nicholas Anderson
- Date of birth: 1865
- Place of birth: Wolverhampton, England
- Date of death: Unknown
- Position: Forward

Senior career*
Years	Team	Apps	(Gls)
1888–1889	Wolverhampton Wanderers	2	(0)
- * Club domestic league appearances and goals

Nicholas Anderson (1865 – unknown) was an English professional footballer, who appeared for Wolverhampton Wanderers in the inaugural season of the Football League.

Nicholas Anderson made his League and club debut on 8 September 1888, as a forward for Wolverhampton Wanderers in a 1–1 draw against Aston Villa at Wolverhampton's then home ground, Dudley Road.

He only played two of the "Wolves" 22 Football League matches in season 1888–89.

Nicholas Anderson had failed to make an impact at Dudley Road and left Wolverhampton Wanderers in May 1889.
