= Jack Baynton =

English footballer

Personal information
- Date of birth: 20 March 1859
- Place of birth: Rushock, Worcestershire, England
- Date of death: 17 May 1939 (aged 80)
- Place of death: Alfreton, England
- Positions: Goalkeeper; utility player

Senior career*
Years	Team	Apps	(Gls)
1877–1889	Wolverhampton Wanderers	18	(0)
1889–1890	Kidderminster Olympic		
- * Club domestic league appearances and goals

John Baynton (20 March 1859 – 17 May 1939) was an English footballer who played in the Football League for Wolverhampton Wanderers. Note: There is evidence that Jack Baynton was born in 1860, not 1859. According to the FreeBMD website there was no J Baynton born in 1859 in Rushock but there was in the 2nd quarter of 1860. Also, all sources agree Baynton died 17 May 1939. FreeBMD show a John Baynton died aged 79 which leads to a birth in 1860.

== Early career ==
Baynton was a pupil–teacher at St Luke's School in Blakenhall, whose football team was to become to Wolverhampton Wanderers. Baynton lined up initially for Blakenhall St. Luke's, as a centre–half, appearing in his first match on 15 March 1877. He became an officially registered footballer at the outset of the club in 1877 and appeared for them in various roles, including right-back and centre-forward. Not the tallest of defenders at just 5 ft 9ins, he then surprisingly changed positions to become a goalkeeper, and this became his favoured position. In the early days Baynton also acted as club secretary and treasurer.

He appeared in Wolves' first-ever FA Cup tie (in October 1883) and first-ever league match (in September 1888), as well as skippering them to their first-ever silverware, the 1884 Wrekin Cup. A wholehearted outfield player and team captain, who never gave less than 100 per cent, Baynton was also a very capable goalkeeper. Indeed, as a 'keeper, he once scored a goal from almost 100 yards, fly–kicking the ball downfield and between the posts when playing in a game at Dudley Road.

== Season 1888–1889 ==
Jack Baynton made his League debut on 8 September 1888, as a goalkeeper for Wolverhampton Wanderers in a 1–1 draw against Aston Villa at Dudley Road. When Jack Baynton played in goal on 13 October 1888 against Burnley he was 29 years 207 days old; that made him, on that sixth weekend of League football, Wolverhampton Wanderers' oldest player. He played in the 1889 FA Cup Final, where they lost 0–3 to league champions Preston North End. Jack Baynton missed four of the "Wolves" 22 Football League matches in season 1888-89 and was part of a defence-line that kept three clean sheets and kept the opposition to one-in-a-League-match on six occasions.

== 1889 onwards ==
He joined Kidderminster Olympic in April 1889 but retired the following year, continuing on as a teacher and he also took up refereeing and officiated in several first–class matches.
