= Arthur Lowder =

English footballer

Personal information
- Full name: Arthur Lowder
- Date of birth: 11 February 1863
- Place of birth: Wolverhampton, England
- Date of death: 4 January 1926 (aged 62)
- Place of death: Taunton, England
- Position: Left half

Senior career*
Years	Team	Apps	(Gls)
- St Luke's
1882–1891	Wolves	46	(1)

International career
1889	England	1	(0)
- * Club domestic league appearances and goals

Arthur Lowder (11 February 1863 – 4 January 1926) was an English international footballer of the 1880s and 1890s who played as a left half with Wolverhampton Wanderers.

He joined Wolverhampton Wanderers (Wolves) in 1882 from St Luke's. As a player he was an extremely hard but fair tackler, preferring the left–half berth although occasionally figuring in the forward line. He appeared in Wolverhampton Wanderers first–ever FA Cup tie in 1883. He wasn't a tall man, standing 5 ft 5ins tall, yet he loved a challenge and never gave an inch.

Arthur Lowder, playing as a wing–half, made his League debut on 8 September 1888, at Dudley Road, the then home of Wolverhampton Wanderers . The visitors were Aston Villa and the match ended as a 1–1 draw. Arthur Lowder scored his debut and only League goal on 26 January 1889 at Dudley Road, against Everton. Wolverhampton Wanderers won the match 5-0 and Arthur Lowder scored the opening goal. Lowder appeared in 18 of the 22 League matches played by Wolverhampton Wanderers during the 1888–89 season and scored one goal. Playing as a wing–half (16 appearances) he was part of a midfield that achieved a big (three-League-goals-or-more) win on five occasions. He also played in the 1889 FA Cup Final as Wolverhampton Wanderers lost to Preston North End 3–0.

Lowder was capped on one occasion by the England national football team, playing against Wales at Stoke-on-Trent on 23 February 1889. He was chosen to play in the match following the withdrawal of Alf Shelton.

Arthur Lowder retired through injury in October 1891. In later years he went over to Europe where he coached in France, Germany and Norway, before returning to England in 1924 to become Chairman of the Brewood Parish Council, a position he held for 12 years. Lowder died in Taunton, Somerset, on 4 January 1926

Arthur Lowder made a total of 71 competitive appearances (46 in the Football League) for them (scoring 3 goals - 1League goal), before retiring in 1891.

== Honours ==
Wolves

- FA Cup finalists: 1889
