= David Black (footballer, born 1868) =

Scottish footballer

Personal information
- Full name: David Gibson Black
- Date of birth: 29 March 1868
- Place of birth: Irvine, Scotland
- Date of death: 1940 (aged 71–72)
- Position: Outside left

Youth career
- –1889: Hurlford

Senior career*
Years	Team	Apps	(Gls)
1889–1891	Grimsby Town		
1891–1893	Middlesbrough		
1893–1896	Wolverhampton Wanderers	74	(15)
1896–1897	Burnley	12	(5)
1897–1898	Tottenham Hotspur	20	(8)
1898–1899	Woolwich Arsenal	0	(0)
1900–1902	Clyde		

International career
1889	Scotland	1	(1)
- * Club domestic league appearances and goals

David Gibson Black (29 March 1868 – 1940) was a Scottish international footballer who scored in the 1896 FA Cup Final for Wolverhampton Wanderers. He also played for both Tottenham Hotspur and Arsenal.

== Career ==
Black was playing for local club Hurlford when he was capped by the Scotland national team in 1889. He played and scored in a 7–0 victory over Ireland at Ibrox on 9 March.

He moved south to Middlesbrough, then of the Northern League, before joining Wolverhampton Wanderers in 1893, making his Football League on 2 September 1893 in a 7–1 loss at Nottingham Forest.

He featured regularly for Wolves between 1893 and 1896, and appeared in the 1896 FA Cup Final for them. He netted an equaliser during the final but ultimately had to settle for a runners-up medal as Sheffield Wednesday won the game 2–1.

After 84 appearances and 17 goals (in total) for the Midlanders, he moved to Burnley in 1896. His stay at Turf Moor was extremely brief though and he soon left for Tottenham Hotspur.

He spent just one full season with Spurs. At the beginning of the season he made his Southern League debut away against Sheppey United in a 3–3 draw. He played and scored in both of Tottenham's FA Cup games in that season.

Black joined Woolwich Arsenal in May 1898. However, he did not play for Arsenal at any level.

After leaving Arsenal Black returned to Scotland to play for Clyde where he stayed for two years before retiring from the game.

He died in 1940.
