= Jimmy Massey (footballer) =

English footballer

Personal information
- Full name: James Henry Massey
- Date of birth: 26 January 1869
- Place of birth: Monmore Green, Wolverhampton, England
- Date of death: 2 December 1960 (aged 91)
- Place of death: Mexborough, England
- Height: 5 ft 10 in (1.78 m)
- Position: Goalkeeper

Senior career*
Years	Team	Apps	(Gls)
- Denaby United
?−1890	Mexborough		
1890–1893	Doncaster Rovers		
1893–1901	The Wednesday	159	(0)
1902–?	Denaby United		
- South Kirkby Colliery
- Hickleton Main
1910	Conisborough St Peter's		
- * Club domestic league appearances and goals

James Massey (26 January 1869 – 2 December 1960) was an English footballer who played as goalkeeper for Denaby United, Mexborough, Doncaster Rovers and The Wednesday in the late 1800s and the early 20th century.

Born in Monmore Green, Wolverhampton Massey moved to Yorkshire where he played for Denaby and then Mexborough before signing for Doncaster Rovers in 1890, who were then playing in the Midland Football Alliance League. Two days after winning the Sheffield and Hallamshire Senior Cup on 21 March 1891 against Sheffield United, Massey represented the Sheffield and Hallamshire F.A. in a match against the Berks and Bucks F.A., something he did on other occasions too.

Massey moved to The Wednesday in 1893 where he played in the Football League until 1901. After taking the place of Bill Allan as the Owls regular goalkeeper, one of the highlights of his career was the victory in the 1896 FA Cup Final where Wednesday beat Wolverhampton Wanderers 2−1 at Crystal Palace.

In 1902 he returned to his original club Denaby United as an amateur whilst working at the local pit, he noted to the media at the time of joining Denaby that he had not played football for over two years. He continued playing for local clubs, including South Kirkby Colliery, until he lost an eye in a mining accident.

His grandson Roy Massey played League football as a centre forward for several clubs in the 1960s.

== Honours ==
Doncaster Rovers

- Midland Alliance League runners up: 1890−91
- Sheffield and Hallamshire Senior Cup winners: 1890-91

The Wednesday

- Football League Second Division winners: 1899−1900
- FA Cup winners: 1895−96
- Sheffield and Hallamshire Senior Cup winners: 1894–95, 1899–1900, 1901–02; runners up: 1897–98
