= Billy Tennant (footballer) =

English footballer

Personal information
- Full name: William Tennant
- Date of birth: 12 July 1865
- Place of birth: Wolverhampton, England
- Date of death: 6 December 1927 (aged 62)
- Height: 6 ft 0 in (1.83 m)
- Position: Goalkeeper

Senior career*
Years	Team	Apps	(Gls)
1881–1890	Willenhall Pickwick		
1890–1895	Hartshill Unity		
1895–1897	Wolverhampton Wanderers	39	(0)
1898–1901	Walsall	100	(0)
1901–1902	Grimsby Town	13	(0)
- * Club domestic league appearances and goals

William Tennant (12 July 1865 – 6 December 1927) was an English professional footballer who played as a goalkeeper.
