= Harry Allen (footballer, born 1866) =

English footballer (1866–1895)

Personal information
- Date of birth: 19 January 1866
- Place of birth: Walsall, England
- Date of death: 23 February 1895 (aged 29)
- Place of death: Walsall, England
- Position: Centre half

Senior career*
Years	Team	Apps	(Gls)
1883–1886	Walsall Swifts		
1886–1894	Wolverhampton Wanderers	123	(8)

International career
1888–1890	England	5	(0)
- * Club domestic league appearances and goals

Harry Allen (19 January 1866 – 23 February 1895) was an English international footballer, who played most of his career for Wolverhampton Wanderers, and was their captain.

== Career ==
Allen started his career with Walsall Swifts in 1883 before moving to Wolverhampton Wanderers in 1886, making his senior debut - and scoring - in a 6–0 FA Cup win over Matlock Town on 30 October 1886. Harry Allen was a formidable defender, 'rather rash at times' but nevertheless a great competitor for Wolverhampton Wanderers.

Harry Allen made his Football League debut on 8 September 1888, playing at centre–half, at Dudley Road, the then home of Wolverhampton Wanderers. The home team drew with the visitors, Aston Villa 1–1. Allen also played in the 1889 FA Cup Final, where Wolverhampton Wanderers lost 3–0 to League Champions Preston North End. Harry Allen, playing at centre–half (22 appearances), appeared in all of the Wolverhampton Wanderers 22 Football League matches in season 1888–89 and was part of a defence-line that kept four clean–sheets and restricted the opposition to one–League–goal–in–a–match on eight separate occasions. Harry Allen and Dick Baugh were the only Wolverhampton Wanderers players to appear in every League match in season 1888–89.

Despite the setback of losing a FA Cup Final, he went one step further in 1893 as he scored the only goal to lift the FA Cup against Everton and he was the Wolverhampton Wanderers team captain.

Allen's club form won him a call-up to the England team in 1888, as he made his debut in a 5–1 win over Wales on 4 February 1888. He won 5 caps in total, all in Home International fixtures spread over three years.

Illness and a back injury forced him to retire from the game though in October 1894. In total, he made 153 appearances for Wolves, scoring 8 goals. He became landlord of a pub in Wolverhampton, but died suddenly on 23 February 1895, aged 29.

== Honours ==
- FA Cup winner: 1893
- FA Cup finalist: 1889
