= Charlie Mason (footballer, born 1863) =

English footballer

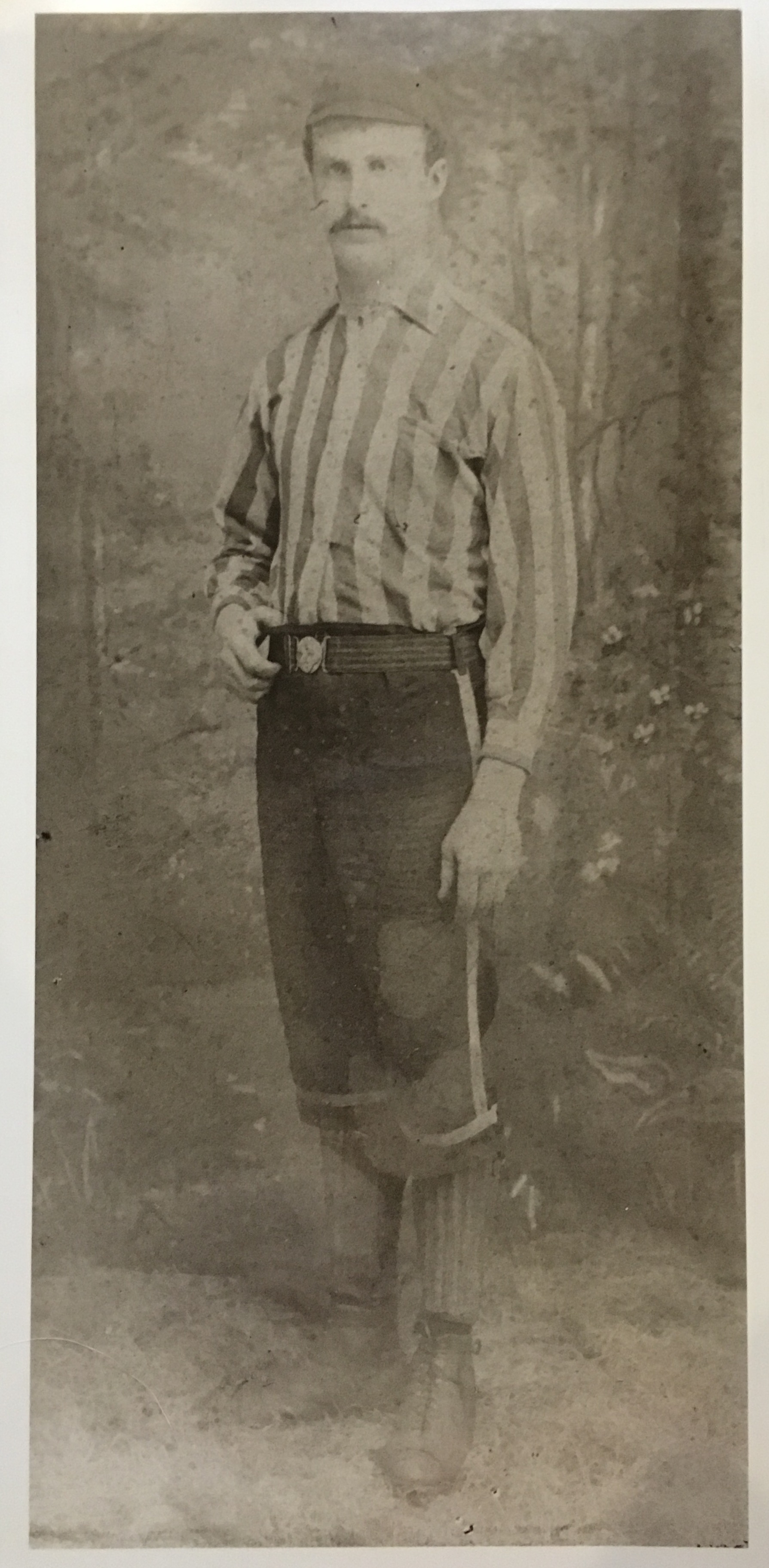

Personal information
- Date of birth: 13 April 1863
- Place of birth: Wolverhampton, England
- Date of death: 3 February 1941 (aged 77)
- Position: Left back

Senior career*
| Years | Team | Apps | (Gls) |
| 1877–1892 | Wolverhampton Wanderers | 75 | (1) |

International career
| 1887–1890 | England | 3 | (0) |
- * Club domestic league appearances and goals

Charles Mason, known as Charlie Mason, (13 April 1863 – 3 February 1941) was an English professional footballer, who played for Wolverhampton Wanderers.

Robust full–back Charlie Mason was born in Wolverhampton on 13 April 1863. Founder member of the club after leaving St. Luke's School in 1877, he went on to enjoy 15 splendid years with Wolverhampton Wanderers, making almost 300 appearances, including over 100 in the League and FA Cup competitions before announcing his retirement during the Summer of 1892.

Charlie Mason, playing as a full–back, made his League debut on 8 September 1888, at Dudley Road, the then home of Wolverhampton Wanderers. The visitors were Aston Villa and the match ended as a 1–1 draw. Mason appeared in 20 of the 22 League matches played by Wolverhampton Wanderers during the 1888–89 season. Playing as a full–back (20 appearances) he was part of a defence-line that kept three clean–sheets and kept the opposition to one–League–goal–in–a–match on eight separate occasions. He also played in the 1889 FA Cup Final as Wolverhampton Wanderers lost to Preston North End 3–0.

He became the first player in the club's history to receive a call-up to the England team in 1887, making his debut in a 7–0 thumping of Ireland on 5 February 1887. He won 3 caps in total, all in Home International fixtures spread over three years.

He died on 3 February 1941, in Wolverhampton aged 77.
