= Billy Owen =

English footballer

Personal information
- Full name: William Owen
- Date of birth: 1872
- Place of birth: Wolverhampton, England
- Date of death: 1906 (aged 33–34)
- Position: Centre half

Senior career*
Years	Team	Apps	(Gls)
1892–1893	Dudley Road Excelsior		
1893–1894	Wolverhampton Wanderers	18	(3)
1894–1895	Loughborough		
1895–1898	Wolverhampton Wanderers	88	(4)
1898–1899	Everton	13	(0)
Total		119	(10)
- * Club domestic league appearances and goals

William Owen (1872–1906) was an English footballer who played in the Football League for Everton and Wolverhampton Wanderers.
