= John Benton (footballer) =

English footballer (1865–1932)

Personal information
- Date of birth: 1865
- Place of birth: Wolverhampton, England
- Date of death: 1932 (aged 66–67)
- Position: Defender

Senior career*
Years	Team	Apps	(Gls)
1885	St. Phillips		
1886	Stafford Royal		
1887	Willenhall White Star		
1888–1889	Wolverhampton Wanderers	1	(0)
1889	Blakenhall		
1890	Wightwick		
- * Club domestic league appearances and goals

John Benton (1865 – 1932) was an English footballer who played for Wolverhampton Wanderers.

== Early career ==
Described as a burly wing–half Benton became a Youth Player in 1885 with St. Phillips FC. No records apparently exist about this club but there is a St. Phillips church in Wolverhampton, built on the edge of what is now Bradmore Recreation Ground so maybe, Benton played for a Church team. After one season at St. Phillips Benton moved North to Stafford Royal FC in 1886. Again the only reference that could be found to Stafford Royal is a ceramics manufacturer so, it is possible that Stafford Royal FC was a works–team. After one year at Stafford Royal Benton moved again to Willenhall. In 1887 he signed for Willenhall White Star to which I can found no reference. Benton joined Wolverhampton Wanderers either in 1887 or, more likely in 1888.

== Season 1888–89 ==
Jack Benton, playing as one of the two wing-halves made his Club and League debut on 15 September 1888, at Dudley Road the then home of Wolverhampton Wanderers. The visitors were Preston North End who won the match 4–0. Jack Benton appeared in one of the 22 Football League matches played by Wolverhampton Wanderers in season 1888–89.

== 1889 onwards ==
Jack Benton left Wolverhampton Wanderers and returned to non-league football in 1889. In 1889 he assisted Blakenhall (Note: St. Luke's, Blakenhall were the founding club of Wolverhampton Wanderers (see Jack Baynton. In 1890 Benton moved to Wightwick FC. Wightwick is a village on the western edge of Wolverhampton but I can find no reference to a Wightwick Football Club (see Wightwick.
