= 1895–96 FA Cup =

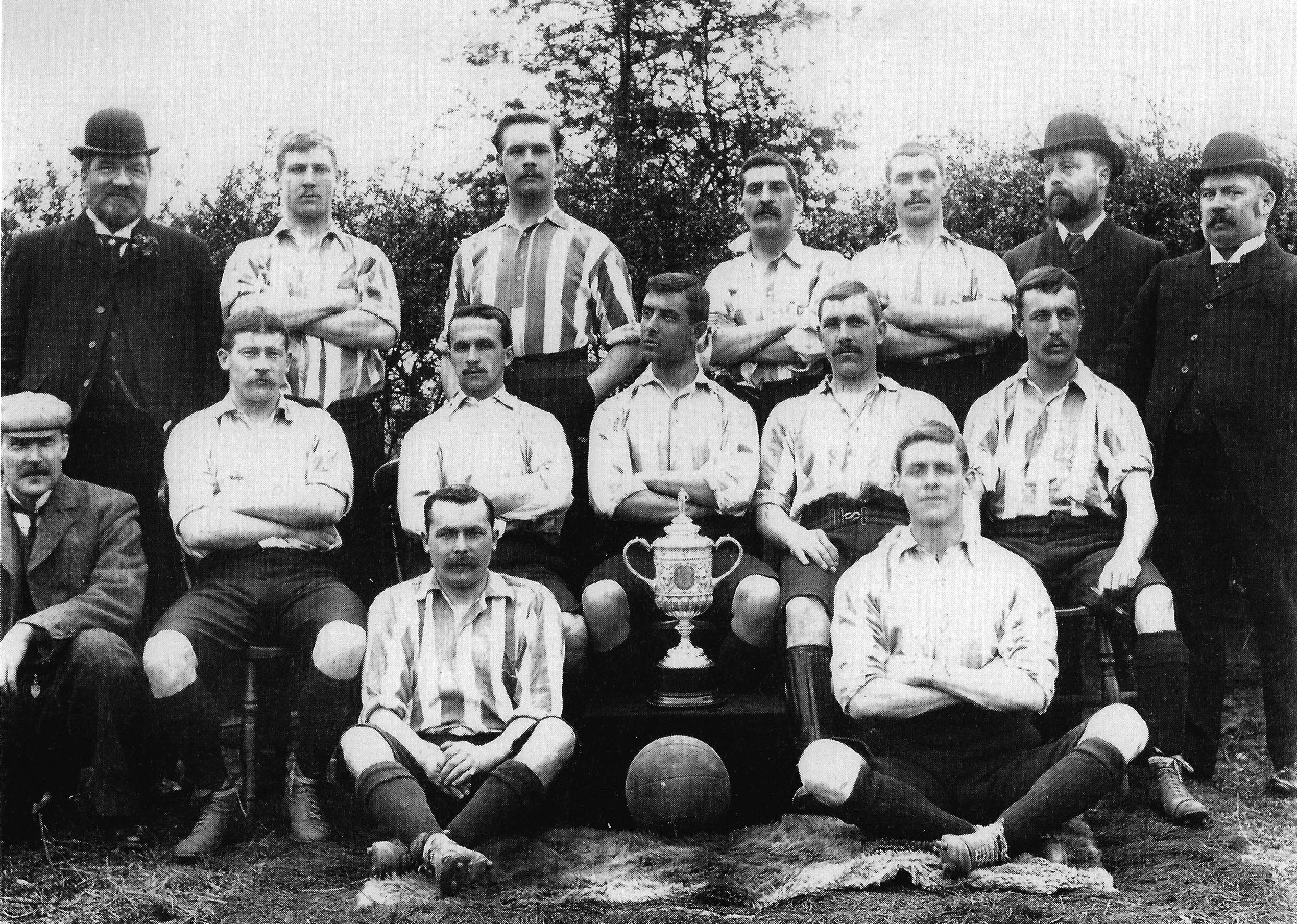
- Sheffield Wednesday team members with the FA Cup

Tournament details
- Country: England; Wales

Final positions
- Champions: The Wednesday (1st title)
- Runners-up: Wolverhampton Wanderers

The 1895–96 FA Cup was the 25th season of the world's oldest association football competition, the Football Association Challenge Cup (more usually known as the FA Cup). The cup was won by The Wednesday, who defeated Wolverhampton Wanderers 2–1 in the final of the competition, played at Crystal Palace in London. This was Wednesday's first victory in the FA Cup.

Matches were scheduled to be played at the stadium of the team named first on the date specified for each round, which was always a Saturday. If scores were level after 90 minutes had been played, a replay would take place at the stadium of the second-named team later the same week. If the replayed match was drawn further replays would be held at neutral venues until a winner was determined. If scores were level after 90 minutes had been played in a replay, a 30-minute period of extra time would be played.

== Calendar ==
The format of the FA Cup for the season had a preliminary round, four qualifying rounds, three proper rounds, and the semi-finals and final.

Round	Start date
Preliminary round	Saturday 5 October 1895
First round qualifying	Saturday 12 October 1895
Second round qualifying	Saturday 2 November 1895
Third round qualifying	Saturday 23 November 1895
Fourth round qualifying	Saturday 14 December 1895
First round proper	Saturday 1 February 1896
Second round proper	Saturday 15 February 1896
Third round proper	Saturday 29 February 1896
Semi-finals	Saturday 21 March 1896
Final	Saturday 18 April 1896

== Qualifying rounds ==
The 16 First Division sides were given byes to the first round, as were Notts County, Darwen, Burton Wanderers, Liverpool, Newton Heath and Woolwich Arsenal from the Second Division. The other Second Division sides were entered into the first qualifying round. Of those sides, only Grismby Town, Newcastle United, Crewe Alexandra and Burton Swifts qualified for the competition proper. Non-league sides Blackpool, Chesterfield, Kettering, Tottenham Hotspur, Millwall Athletic and Southampton St Mary's also qualified, with Tottenham Hotspur and Kettering appearing at this stage for the first time.

== First round proper ==
The First Round Proper contained sixteen ties between 32 teams. The matches were played on Saturday, 1 February 1896. Two matches were drawn, with the replays taking place in the following midweek.

Tie no	Home team	Score	Away team	Date
1	Blackpool	4–1	Burton Swifts	1 February 1896
2	Chesterfield	0–4	Newcastle United	1 February 1896
3	Darwen	0–2	Grimsby Town	1 February 1896
4	Burnley	6–1	Woolwich Arsenal	1 February 1896
5	Liverpool	4–1	Millwall Athletic	1 February 1896
6	Stoke	5–0	Tottenham Hotspur	1 February 1896
7	Nottingham Forest	0–2	Everton	1 February 1896
8	Blackburn Rovers	1–2	West Bromwich Albion	1 February 1896
9	Wolverhampton Wanderers	2–2	Notts County	1 February 1896
Replay	Notts County	3–4	Wolverhampton Wanderers	5 February 1896
10	Crewe Alexandra	0–4	Bolton Wanderers	1 February 1896
11	Sunderland	4–1	Preston North End	1 February 1896
12	Derby County	4–2	Aston Villa	1 February 1896
13	Burton Wanderers	1–1	Sheffield United	1 February 1896
Replay	Sheffield United	1–0	Burton Wanderers	6 February 1896
14	Newton Heath	2–1	Kettering	1 February 1896
15	Small Heath	1–4	Bury	1 February 1896
16	Southampton St Mary's	2–3	The Wednesday	1 February 1896

== Second round proper ==
The eight Second Round matches were scheduled for Saturday, 15 February 1896. There were three replays, played in the following midweek.

Tie no	Home team	Score	Away team	Date
1	Blackpool	0–2	Bolton Wanderers	15 February 1896
2	Burnley	1–1	Stoke	15 February 1896
Replay	Stoke	7–1	Burnley	20 February 1896
3	The Wednesday	2–1	Sunderland	15 February 1896
4	Grimsby Town	1–1	West Bromwich Albion	15 February 1896
Replay	West Bromwich Albion	3–0	Grimsby Town	20 February 1896
5	Wolverhampton Wanderers	2–0	Liverpool	15 February 1896
6	Everton	3–0	Sheffield United	15 February 1896
7	Newton Heath	1–1	Derby County	15 February 1896
Replay	Derby County	5–1	Newton Heath	19 February 1896
8	Newcastle United	1–3	Bury	15 February 1896

== Third round proper ==
The four Third Round matches were scheduled for Saturday, 29 February 1896. There were no replays needed.

Tie no	Home team	Score	Away team	Date
1	The Wednesday	4–0	Everton	29 February 1896
2	Bolton Wanderers	2–0	Bury	29 February 1896
3	Wolverhampton Wanderers	3–0	Stoke	29 February 1896
4	Derby County	1–0	West Bromwich Albion	29 February 1896

== Semi-finals ==
The semi-final matches were both played on Saturday, 21 March 1896. The Wednesday and Wolverhampton Wanderers went on to meet in the final at Crystal Palace.

21 March 1896

The Wednesday	1–1	Bolton Wanderers

Goodison Park, Liverpool

Replay

28 March 1896

The Wednesday	3–1	Bolton Wanderers

Town Ground, Nottingham

21 March 1896

Wolverhampton Wanderers	2–1	Derby County

Wellington Road, Birmingham

== Final ==
The final took place on Saturday, 18 April 1896 at Crystal Palace. Fewer than 50,000 supporters attended the match. The match finished 2–1 to The Wednesday, through two early goals from Fred Spiksley. Between the two goals, David Black had equalised for Wolves.

=== Match details ===
18 April 1896

The Wednesday	2–1	Wolverhampton Wanderers
Spiksley 1' 18'		Black 8'

Crystal Palace, London
Attendance: 48,836
Referee: William Simpson

The Wednesday	Wolverhampton Wanderers

== See also ==
- FA Cup Final Results 1872-
