= David Wykes =

English footballer (1867–1895)

Personal information
- Date of birth: 15 September 1867
- Place of birth: Wolverhampton, England
- Date of death: 7 October 1895 (aged 28)
- Positions: Inside forward; winger

Youth career
- Bloxwich Strollers
- Wednesbury Town
- Walsall Swifts

Senior career*
Years	Team	Apps	(Gls)
1888–1895	Wolverhampton Wanderers	151	(57)
- * Club domestic league appearances and goals

David Wykes (15 September 1867 – 7 October 1895) was an English footballer who played for Wolverhampton Wanderers in the Football League, making his debut in its inaugural season in 1888-1889.

== Career ==
Born in Walsall on 15 September 1867, he played initially for Bloxwich Strollers, then Wednesbury Town and his home club Walsall Swifts before signing for Wolverhampton Wanderers in August 1888.

David Wykes, playing as one of the two wingers made his League debut on 15 September 1888, at Dudley Road, the then home of Wolverhampton Wanderers. The visitors were Preston North End and the home team were defeated 4–0. At the time he was 21 years old; which made him, on the second weekend of League football, Wolverhampton Wanderers' youngest player. He was supplanted by Harry Wood as youngest Wolves player on 6 October 1888. He scored his first League goal on 29 September 1888 at Dudley Road when the visitors were Blackburn Rovers. Wykes scored the second of Wolverhampton Wanderers two goals as the match was drawn 2–2. Wykes appeared in 18 of the 22 League matches played by Wolverhampton Wanderers during the 1888–89 season and scored four goals. He also played in the 1889 FA Cup Final as Wolverhampton Wanderers lost to Preston North End 3–0.

Wykes was on the winning side in 1893, when Wolves beat Everton.

David Wykes played a total of 179 matches for Wolves, scoring 69 goals. He died in a Wolverhampton hospital of typhoid fever and pneumonia on 7 October 1895, aged 28, the day after playing against Stoke on 5 October 1895. His son David died in a motorcycle accident in Walsall.

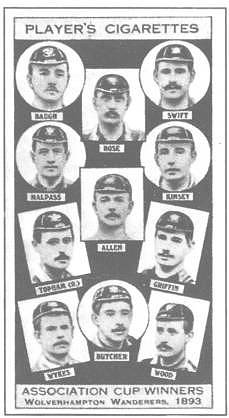
Wolverhampton Wanderers Cigarette Card

Picture of David Wykes and Wolverhampton 1893 team.
