= Billy Malpass =

English footballer (1867–1939)

Personal information
- Full name: William Malpass
- Date of birth: 5 March 1867
- Place of birth: Wednesbury, England
- Date of death: 1939 (aged 71–72)
- Position: Centre half

Senior career*
Years	Team	Apps	(Gls)
1890–1891	Wednesbury Old Athletic		
1891–1899	Wolverhampton Wanderers	133	(6)
Total		133	(6)
- * Club domestic league appearances and goals

William Malpass (5 March 1867 – 1939) was an English footballer who played in the Football League for Wolverhampton Wanderers. Famous musical composer and Wolves supporter Edward Elgar wrote one of the first football chants—"He Banged The Leather for Goal"—in honour of Malpass.
