= Jack Addenbrooke =

English footballer and manager

Personal information
- Full name: John Henry Addenbrooke
- Date of birth: 6 June 1865
- Place of birth: Wolverhampton, England
- Date of death: 7 September 1922 (aged 57)
- Place of death: Wolverhampton, England

Senior career*
Years	Team	Apps	(Gls)
1883–1885	Wolverhampton Wanderers	0	(0)

Managerial career
- 1885–1922: Wolverhampton Wanderers
- * Club domestic league appearances and goals

John Henry Addenbrooke (6 June 1865 – 7 September 1922) was an English football player and manager, who spent his career with Wolverhampton Wanderers.

== Career ==
Addenbrooke was one of the founding members of Wolverhampton Wanderers (as St. Lukes F.C.) in 1877 while working as a teacher at St. Luke's School in Blakenhall. He moved to Saltley College in Birmingham, but in 1883 joined Wolves as a player, playing as a forward in their reserve side, but never making a first team appearance.

In August 1885 he was appointed as Wolves' first-ever paid secretary-manager, guiding the side to FA Cup wins in 1893 and 1908 and runners-up in 1889, 1896 and 1921. He was awarded an English Football League long-service medal in 1909.

He took leave from the club in June 1922 due to ill health and died just months later. His 37-year term as manager of Wolves remains the longest in club history.

== See also ==
- List of football managers with the most matches
