= Dudley Road =

Football ground in Wolverhampton, England

- Interactive map of Dudley Road
- Location: Wolverhampton, England
- Coordinates: 52.5684°N 2.1254°W
- Surface: Grass
- Record attendance: 10,000

Construction
- Opened: 1881
- Closed: 1889 destroy = 1889

Tenant
- Wolverhampton Wanderers

Dudley Road was a football ground in Wolverhampton in England. It was the home ground of Wolverhampton Wanderers between 1881 and 1889, and was used during the first season of the Football League.

== History ==
The ground began to be used in 1881 but had sparse facilities, consisting of only a lean-to shelter on the southern touchline and a small standing area with duckboards. It was located to the south of Wolverhampton town centre and to the east of Dudley Road.

Wolves were founder members of the Football League in 1888, and the first League match played at Dudley Road on 8 September 1888 was a 1–1 draw with Aston Villa watched by 2,500 spectators. The first League goal at the ground was an own goal by Villa's Gershom Cox, and was thought for many years to have been the first-ever goal scored in the Football League, although modern research revealed it was actually scored earlier that day at Pike's Lane by Kenny Davenport of Bolton Wanderers. The ground's record attendance of 10,000 was set on 2 March 1889 for an FA Cup match against The Wednesday. This was also the last match played at Dudley Road, as Wolves moved to Molineux Stadium for the start of the 1889–90 season.

The site was later used for housing, with the main road through the estate named "Wanderers Avenue".
