= 1883–84 West Bromwich Albion F.C. season =

West Bromwich Albion
1883–84 season
- Chairman: None (Note: Albion did not have a chairman until 1885.)
- Manager: None (Note: Albion did not have a secretary-manager until 1890 and did not appoint a full-time manager until 1948.)
- Stadium: Four Acres
- FA Cup: First round
- Birmingham Senior Cup: Semi-final
- Staffordshire Senior Cup: Runners-up
- Birmingham Charity Cup: Semi-final
- Wednesbury Charity Cup: Semi-final
- Top goalscorer: League: N/A (Note: There was no league football in England until 1888–89.); All: Harry Aston and George Timmins (9) (Note: Includes all matches in the FA Cup, Birmingham Senior Cup, Staffordshire Senior Cup, Birmingham Charity Cup and Wednesbury Charity Cup.)
- Highest home attendance: 5,129 (vs Wednesbury Town, FA Cup first round, 10 November 1883)
- Lowest home attendance: 600 (vs Cocknage, Staffordshire Senior Cup first round, 3 December 1883)
- Average home league attendance: 2,438
Home colours

The 1883–84 season was the sixth season in the history of West Bromwich Albion Football Club. Albion played their home matches at the Four Acres during the season, and the team wore a chocolate and white coloured kit. The club competed in the FA Cup for the first time, losing in the first round. They did reach the final of the Staffordshire Senior Cup, but were defeated by St George's in the final. Albion also participated in the Birmingham Senior Cup, Birmingham Charity Cup and Wednesbury Charity Cup, but were eliminated at the semi-final stage of all three competitions.

== FA Cup ==
Having joined The Football Association in the summer of 1883, West Bromwich Albion became eligible to take part in the FA Cup for the first time. Their first season in the competition was not a successful one however, as the team lost 0–2 to local rivals Wednesbury Town in the first round.

Round	Date	Opponent	Venue	Result (Note: Albion's score is listed first, regardless of venue or result.)	Goalscorers	Attendance
1	10 November 1883	Wednesbury Town	H	0–2	—	5,129

Source for match details:

== Birmingham Senior Cup ==
Albion took part in the Birmingham Senior Cup for the third time. In the first round, they won 7–0 against Stourbridge Standard, then defeated Walsall Alma Athletic 6–0 in the second round. Albion drew 1–1 with Wednesbury Old Athletic in round three. George Timmins scored a hat-trick in the replay, but the match finished 3–3, meaning that a second replay would be required. Albion won 3–1 at Aston Lower Grounds. After a 1–1 draw against Wolverhampton Wanderers, Albion won the fourth round replay 2–1. In the semi-final, Albion lost 0–1 to Walsall Swifts at Aston Lower Grounds.

Round	Date	Opponent	Venue	Result	Goalscorers	Attendance
1	27 October 1883	Stourbridge Standard	H	7–0	Bisseker 2, Timmins 2, G Bell, Bunn, Aston	2,000
2	8 December 1883	Walsall Alma Athletic	H	6–0	Timmins 2, G Bell, Aston, Smith, Loach	2,500
3	5 January 1884	Wednesbury Old Athletic	H	1–1	G Bell	3,000
3(R)	9 February 1884	Wednesbury Old Athletic	A	3–3	Timmins 3	700
3(2R)	18 February 1884	Wednesbury Old Athletic	N	3–1	G Bell, Aston, Kent (o.g.)	3,000
4	23 February 1884	Wolverhampton Wanderers	N	1–1	Bisseker	5,000
4(R)	3 March 1884	Wolverhampton Wanderers	N	2–1	Aston, Bisseker	3,800
SF	10 March 1884	Walsall Swifts	N	0–1	—	2,000

Source for match details:

== Staffordshire Senior Cup ==
Albion entered the 1883–84 Staffordshire Senior Cup as defending champions, having won the trophy at the first attempt during the previous season. The club's second season in the competition saw them defeat Cocknage in the first round, George Bell scoring the only goal of the game. In the second round, Harry Aston scored all four goals in the club's 4–0 victory against Walsall Town. The semi-final took place in Wednesbury, against Stoke; goals from Billy Bisseker and George Timmins put Albion into the final for the second successive season. Their opponents in the final were St George's, who had knocked Albion out of the Wednesbury Charity Cup two weeks earlier. The match took place at Stoke's Victoria Ground in front of 5,500 spectators. Arthur Loach scored for Albion, but the team failed to retain the cup as St George's were 2–1 winners.

Round	Date	Opponent	Venue	Result	Goalscorers	Attendance
1	3 December 1883	Cocknage	H	1–0	G Bell	600
2	22 December 1883	Walsall Town	H	4–0	Aston 4	1,400
SF	15 March 1884	Stoke	N	2–0	Bisseker, Timmins	3,000
F	12 April 1884	St George's	N	1–2	Loach	5,500

Source for match details:

== Birmingham Charity Cup ==
Aston Villa beat Albion 4–1 in the semi-final of the Birmingham Charity Cup. This was the first time that Albion had participated in this competition.

Round	Date	Opponent	Venue	Result	Goalscorers	Attendance
SF	5 April 1884	Aston Villa	A	1–4	Riddell (o.g.)	6,000

Source for match details:

== Wednesbury Charity Cup ==
Taking part in the Wednesbury Charity Cup for the second time, Albion defeated Aston Unity 3–0 in the first round. The semi-final took place at Aston Lower Grounds and finished in a 1–1 draw between Albion and St George's. In the replay at Wednesbury, St George's won 4–0.

Round	Date	Opponent	Venue	Result	Goalscorers	Attendance
1	24 November 1883	Aston Unity	A	3–0	G Bell, Timmins, Aston	2,500
SF	12 January 1884	St George's	N	1–1	Stevenson (o.g.)	3,700
SF(R)	29 March 1884	St George's	N	0–4	—	3,500

Source for match details:

== Friendly matches ==
As league football had yet to be established, West Bromwich Albion took part in a number of friendly matches throughout the season.

Date	Opponent	Venue	Result
17 September 1883	Forwards XI	A	3–3
1 October 1883	Wednesbury Old Athletic	H	2–5
6 October 1883	Preston North End	A	1–3 (Note: Some reports give the score as 1–2 as the last Preston goal was disputed.)
13 October 1883	Wolverhampton Wanderers	H	4–2
20 October 1883	Stoke	H	1–5
5 November 1883	Walsall Swifts	H	2–2
12 November 1883	Stoke	A	1–1 (Note: Match was abandoned.)
17 November 1883	Blackburn Rovers	A	0–1
19 November 1883	Bolton Wanderers	A	1–2 (Note: Some reports gave the score as 1–3 after a third Bolton 'goal' was disputed.)
1 December 1883	West Bromwich Sandwell	H	5–1
15 December 1883	Wellington (Note: Benefit match for West Bromwich Hospital.)	H	5–1
26 December 1883	Preston North End	H	2–1
27 December 1883	Sheffield Heeley	H	8–0
29 December 1883	Aston Unity	H	1–0
19 January 1884	Aston Unity	H	5–0
26 January 1884	Wednesbury Old Athletic	H	2–0
2 February 1884	Bolton Great Lever	H	4–1
16 February 1884	West Bromwich Albion 2nd XI	H	0–2
26 February 1884	Wednesbury Town	H	2–0
1 March 1884	Wednesbury Old Athletic	A	2–2
22 March 1884	Walsall Town	H	3–2
24 March 1884	West Bromwich Sandwell	H	7–0
19 April 1884	Burslem Port Vale	A	6–0
26 April 1884	Wolverhampton Wanderers	A	3–0
5 May 1884	Walsall Swifts	A	0–1

Source for match details:

== See also ==
- 1883–84 in English football
