= 1882–83 West Bromwich Albion F.C. season =

West Bromwich Albion
1882–83 season
- Chairman: None (Note: Albion did not have a chairman until 1885.)
- Manager: None (Note: Albion did not have a secretary-manager until 1890 and did not appoint a full-time manager until 1948.)
- Stadium: The Four Acres
- Birmingham Senior Cup: Fourth round
- Staffordshire Senior Cup: Winners
- Wednesbury Charity Cup: Runners-up
- Top goalscorer: League: N/A (Note: There was no league football in England until 1888–89.); All: Harry Aston (17) (Note: Includes all matches in the Birmingham Senior Cup, Staffordshire Senior Cup and Wednesbury Charity Cup.)
- Highest home attendance: 10,500 (vs Aston Villa, 23 December 1882)
- Lowest home attendance: 1,200 (vs Bloxwich Strollers, 18 November 1882)
- Average home league attendance: 3,383
Home colours	Away colours

The 1882–83 season was the fifth season in the history of West Bromwich Albion Football Club. This was the club's first season at their fourth ground, the Four Acres. The ground had been home to the West Bromwich Dartmouth Cricket Club since 1834, but the cricket club allowed Albion to play football matches there on Saturdays and Mondays. The club wore two different kits during 1882–83: as well as the chocolate and blue halves from the previous season, the club also sported narrow red and white hoops.

Albion won their first ever trophy when they defeated Stoke 3–2 in the final of the Staffordshire Senior Cup, winning the competition at the first attempt. They also reached the final of the Wednesbury Charity Cup, but lost 5–3 to Notts Rangers. In the Birmingham Senior Cup, Albion reached the fourth round, having registered their record competitive victory—a 26–0 win against Coseley—in round one.

It was the first season in which Albion fielded a reserve side in addition to their first team; the club's second team played 24 matches and went through the season undefeated.

== Birmingham Senior Cup ==
In the first round of their second Birmingham Senior Cup campaign, Albion beat Coseley by a 26–0 scoreline, having led 17–0 at half-time. Every Albion outfield player scored at least once; goalkeeper Bob Roberts was the only one of the team not to appear on the scoresheet. Harry Aston led the scoring, netting five times, while Billy Bisseker, George Timmins and George Bell also scored hat-tricks in what remains the club's record competitive victory. After receiving a bye in round two, Albion defeated Wolverhampton Wanderers 4–2; this was the first ever meeting between the two local rivals and therefore the first Black Country derby match. Wednesbury Old Athletic were the opposition in the fourth round match. Aston scored for Albion but the team lost 2–1 as Old Athletic eliminated Albion from the competition for the second successive season.

Round	Date	Opponent	Venue	Result (Note: Albion's score is listed first, regardless of venue or result.)	Goalscorers	Attendance
1	11 November 1882	Coseley	H	26–0	Aston 5, Bisseker 4, Timmins 4, G. Bell 3, Bunn 2, E Horton 2, Whitehouse 2, While 2, (Note: Matthews (1987) lists the scorer as "White", but this appears to be a typographical error.) H Bell, Stanton. (Note: Bowler (2017) contends that no reliable list of scorers from the game exists.)	2,500
2	Albion received a bye to round three					
3	20 January 1883	Wolverhampton Wanderers	A	4–2	G. Bell, Bisseker, Biddulph, Aston	3,000
4	13 March 1883	Wednesbury Old Athletic	A	1–2	Aston	2,500

Source for match details:

== Staffordshire Senior Cup ==
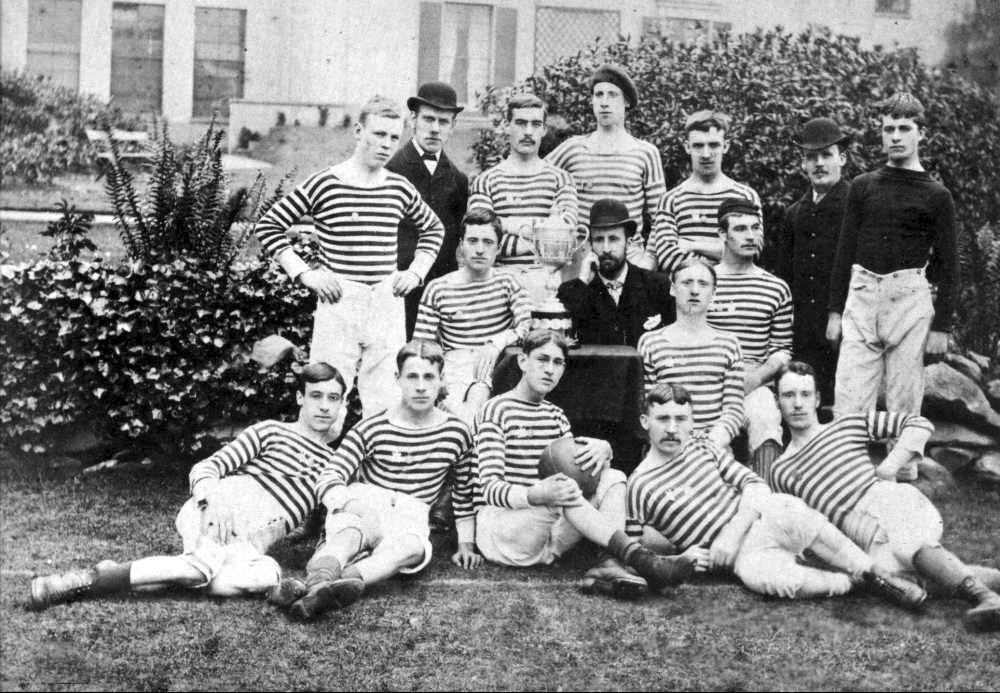
The winning Albion team display the Staffordshire Cup.

Albion, taking part in the Staffordshire Senior Cup for the first time, defeated Bloxwich Strollers 4–0 in the first round replay, following a 3–3 draw. In round two, Albion met local rivals Aston Villa for the first time, and after another 3–3 draw, won the replay with a goal from George Timmins. The team drew 2–2 in the third round, but their opponents St George's were then disqualified from the competition for fielding two ineligible players in the match, so Albion progressed by default. In the semi-final against Leek White Star, Harry Aston scored a hat-trick as Albion won 8–0 to reach a cup final for the first time.

In the final, Albion faced Stoke at the latter's Victoria Ground. More than 1,500 West Bromwich Albion supporters took advantage of a special rail excursion to attend the game. Johnson opened the scoring for Stoke after 15 minutes, but Albion replied through Timmins and Fred Bunn. Stoke equalised before half-time when Johnson claimed his second goal of the match. George Bell scored the winning goal in the second half when he headed a cross past Stoke's goalkeeper Wildin. Albion's 3–2 victory meant that they had won their first ever trophy.

Round	Date	Opponent	Venue	Result	Goalscorers	Attendance
1	4 November 1882	Bloxwich Strollers	A	3–3	G. Bell, Aston, Timmins	650
1(R)	18 November 1882	Bloxwich Strollers	H	4–0	Biddulph 2, G. Bell, Aston	1,200
2	9 December 1882	Aston Villa	A	3–3	G. Bell 2, Aston	13,900
2(R)	23 December 1882	Aston Villa	H	1–0	Timmins	10,500
3	3 February 1883	St George's	H	2–2 (Note: St George's were disqualified from the competition for fielding two ineligible players in the match.)	Timmins, Bisseker	2,000
SF	10 March 1883	Leek White Star	H	8–0	G. Bell, Aston 3, Biddulph 2, Bisseker 2	2,000
F	21 April 1883	Stoke	A	3–2	Timmins, Bunn, G. Bell	6,150

Source for match details:

== Wednesbury Charity Cup ==
Albion participated in the Wednesbury Charity Cup for the first time and drew 3–3 with Wednesbury Strollers in the first round. In the replay, Albion progressed by a 7–1 scoreline. Harry Aston scored the only goal of the semi-final against Aston Unity at Wellington Road. The final took place at the same venue, against Notts Rangers; two goals from Harry Aston and one from Bisseker were not enough as Albion were defeated 5–3.

Round	Date	Opponent	Venue	Result	Goalscorers	Attendance
1	25 November 1882	Wednesbury Strollers	A	3–3	G. Bell, Bisseker, Whitehouse	2,000
1(R)	30 December 1882	Wednesbury Strollers	H	7–1	Bisseker 2, Aston, G. Bell 2, Whitehouse 2	2,100
SF	24 February 1883	Aston Unity	N	1–0	Aston	4,000
F	19 May 1883	Notts Rangers	N	3–5	Aston 2, Bisseker	4,000

Source for match details:

== Friendly matches ==
As league football had yet to be established, West Bromwich Albion took part in a number of friendly matches throughout the season. Among these games was a 10–0 win against Stourbridge Standard in which Billy Bisseker scored six goals. This was the first match held at the Four Acres. Later in the season, Harry Aston scored six times as Albion were 10–1 winners against Birmingham Junior Association. The record of the club's matches during their early years is not complete, thus several of the scorelines are missing.

Date	Opponent	Venue	Result
23 September 1882	St George's	A	1–7
30 September 1882	Oldbury	A	— (Note: Score not recorded.)
7 October 1882	Stourbridge Standard	H	10–0
14 October 1882	Aston Unity	H	1–0
17 October 1882	The Grove	A	—
21 October 1882	Excelsior	A	2–2
2 December 1882	Excelsior	H	3–2
16 December 1882	Leek	H	2–0
26 December 1882	Wrexham	A	5–2
27 December 1882	Notts Rangers	A	2–3
6 January 1883	Wellington	H	—
13 January 1883	Walsall Alma Athletic	H	4–0
22 January 1883	St John's United	H	11–0
27 January 1883	St George's	H	3–0
10 February 1883	Notts Rangers	H	1–1 (Note: Match abandoned.)
17 February 1883	Birmingham Heath	H	3–0
19 February 1883	Birmingham Junior Association	H	10–1
17 March 1883	Leek	A	6–3
19 March 1883	The Grove	A	2–1
26 March 1883	Wellington (Note: Benefit match for West Bromwich Hospital.)	H	4–0
31 March 1883	Wrexham	H	3–1
7 April 1883	Calthorpe (Note: Benefit match for West Bromwich Dartmouth Cricket Club.)	H	6–1
25 April 1883	All Saints	H	—
28 April 1883	Walsall Swifts	A	1–2
5 May 1883	Small Heath Alliance	A	5–1
12 May 1883	Nechells	H	—
16 June 1883	Wednesbury Old Athletic (Note: Benefit match for J Roberts.)	A	2–3

Source for match details:

== See also ==
- 1882–83 in English football
