= 1884–85 West Bromwich Albion F.C. season =

West Bromwich Albion
1884–85 season
- Chairman: Henry Jackson (Note: Jackson became Albion's first chairman in 1885, but the source does not specify the date on which he took over. He may therefore not have become chairman until the following season, 1885–86.)
- Manager: None (Note: Albion did not have a secretary-manager until 1890 and did not appoint a full-time manager until 1948.)
- Stadium: Four Acres
- FA Cup: Sixth round
- Birmingham Senior Cup: Third round
- Staffordshire Senior Cup: Semi-final
- Birmingham Charity Cup: Semi-final
- Top goalscorer: League: N/A (Note: There was no league football in England until 1888–89.); All: Jem Bayliss (16) (Note: Includes the FA Cup, Birmingham Senior Cup, Staffordshire Senior Cup and Birmingham Charity Cup. Nine goalscorers from the 15–0 win against Bloxwich Strollers were not recorded.)
- Highest home attendance: 16,393 (vs Blackburn Rovers
- Lowest home attendance: 1,200 (vs Darlaston All Saints, Birmingham Senior Cup first round, 18 October 1884)
- Average home league attendance: 4,915
Home colours

The 1884–1885 season was 7th season of West Bromwich Albion Football Club. It was their third and final season at the Four Acres and their last season as an amateur club. Continuing the trial of various coloured kits during the club's early years, the players wore cardinal red and blue halved shirts. The club reached the FA Cup quarter-final for the first time, played in the semi-finals of the Staffordshire Senior Cup and Birmingham Charity Cup and were eliminated from the Birmingham Senior Cup at the third round stage.

== FA Cup ==
Albion's second season in the FA Cup began with a first round match away at Junction Street School, Derby. The 7–1 victory was Albion's first ever win in the competition, with Jem Bayliss scoring the club's first FA Cup goal. In round two, Wednesbury Old Athletic were defeated by a 4–2 scoreline. Aston Villa provided the opposition in the third round; after a goalless draw in the initial match, Albion won the replay 3–0 in "drenching rain".

In the fourth round, Albion faced Welsh side, Druids, who did not take to the field by the time the match was due to start. Peter Morris records that the Welshmen refused to start the match until one of their late-arriving players turned up, while according to G. A. Willmore, the entire Druids team was late to arrive. Either way, Albion scored unopposed straight from the kick-off, after which the Druids players did take to the field. Albion scored again, through Arthur Loach, but the earlier goal was not counted and the score was recorded as 1–0.

Albion were then given a bye to the sixth round, the first time that they had reached this stage of the competition. They lost 0–2 to eventual FA Cup winners Blackburn Rovers in front of 16,393 spectators, the highest ever attendance at the Four Acres.

Round	Date	Opponent	Venue	Result (Note: West Bromwich Albion's score is listed first, regardless of venue or result.)	Goalscorers	Attendance
1	25 October 1884	Junction Street School, Derby	A	7–1	Bayliss 2, G Bell 2, Aston 2, Loach	4,000
2	6 December 1884	Wednesbury Old Athletic	H	4–2	Aston 2, Woodhall, Taylor (o.g.)	4,497
3	3 January 1885	Aston Villa	A	0–0	—	22,088
3(R)	10 January 1885	Aston Villa	H	3–0	Loach 2, Bayliss	10,021
4	24 January 1885	Druids	H	1–0	Loach	5,537
5	Albion received a bye to the sixth round					
6	21 February 1885	Blackburn Rovers	H	0–2	—	16,393

Source for match details:

== Birmingham Senior Cup ==
Participating in their fourth Birmingham Senior Cup campaign, Albion faced Darlaston All Saints in the first round. Harry Aston scored a hat-trick in an 8–0 victory. In the second round, Jem Bayliss scored six goals in the team's 15–0 win against Bloxwich Strollers. Albion were eliminated in round three, losing 2–3 to St George's.

Round	Date	Opponent	Venue	Result	Goalscorers	Attendance
1	18 October 1884	Darlaston All Saints	H	8–0	Aston 3, Bayliss 2, Loach 2, Jacobs (o.g.)	1,200
2	22 November 1884	Bloxwich Strollers	H	15–0	Bayliss 6, other scorers not recorded	1,500
3	20 December 1885	St George's	H	2–3	Loach, G Bell	4,000

Source for match details:

== Staffordshire Senior Cup ==
Albion, taking part in the Staffordshire Senior Cup for the third time, beat Burton Swifts 7–1 in the first round. In round two, a hat-trick from Arthur Loach contributed to an 8–0 win against Leek. Another hat-trick in the third round, this time from Jem Bayliss, saw Albion beat Stoke 6–2. Despite having scored 21 goals in the first three rounds, Albion failed to find the net in the semi-final, losing 0–2 to Walsall Town at Stoke's Victoria Ground.

Round	Date	Opponent	Venue	Result	Goalscorers	Attendance
1	8 November 1884	Burton Swifts	H	7–1	G Bell, Loach 2, Aston 2, Bayliss 2	2,000
2	13 December 1884	Leek	H	8–0	Aston, Bayliss 2, Loach 3, Woodhall, G Bell	2,000
3	31 January 1885	Stoke	H	6–2	Bayliss 3, Bettany (o.g.), Aston, G Bell	2,000
SF	28 February 1885	Walsall Town	N	0–2	—	6,000

Source for match details:

== Birmingham Charity Cup ==
In the Birmingham Charity Cup semi-final, Albion were defeated 1–4 by Aston Villa. This was the second season in succession that Villa had beaten Albion in the competition, and by the same scoreline.

Round	Date	Opponent	Venue	Result	Goalscorers	Attendance
SF	18 April 1885	Aston Villa	N	1–4	Bayliss	5,000

Source for match details:

== Friendlies and benefit matches ==
As league football had yet to be established, West Bromwich Albion played in a number of friendly matches throughout the season. On 6 April 1885, Albion played their last game at the Four Acres, ahead of their move to Stoney Lane the following season. They beat Wednesbury Old Athletic 3–2, in front of 3,500 spectators.

Date	Opponent	Venue	Result
28 July 1884	Wednesbury Old Athletic	A	1–0
23 August 1884	Small Heath Alliance	A	2–0
25 August 1884	Aston Villa (Note: Testimonial match for A. Hunter)	A	2–3
22 September 1884	Walsall Swifts	A	1–4
4 October 1884	Burslem Port Vale	H	3–0
11 October 1884	Aston Unity	H	3–0
1 November 1884	Stoke	A	4–0
3 November 1884	Stafford Rangers	H	5–0
15 November 1884	Wednesbury Town	H	7–1
29 November 1884	Aston Villa	H	2–4
23 November 1884	Burnley	H	0–3
28 November 1884	Aston Villa	A	5–4
26 December 1884	Preston North End	A	1–1
27 December 1884	Bolton Great Lever	A	3–0
17 January 1885	Walsall Swifts	H	0–0
7 February 1885	Burslem Port Vale	A	3–2
14 February 1885	Aston Unity	A	2–0
7 March 1885	St. Luke's	H	3–2
14 March 1885	Aston Villa	A	2–1
16 March 1885	West Bromwich Sandwell	H	6–2
21 March 1885	Church	H	1–1
28 March 1885	Church	A	0–2
4 April 1885	Third Lanark Rifle Volunteers	A	2–2
6 April 1885	Wednesbury Old Athletic	H	3–2
11 April 1885	Stoke	A	1–1
20 April 1885	Burslem Port Vale	A	1–1
25 April 1885	Bolton Wanderers	A	0–1 (Note: Match abandoned)
16 May 1885	District XI (Note: Testimonial match for Jimmy Stanton)	A	1–2
25 May 1885	Wolverhampton Wanderers	A	0–2

Source for match details:

== See also ==
- 1884–85 in English football
