= 1885–86 West Bromwich Albion F.C. season =

West Bromwich Albion
1885–86 season
- Chairman: Henry Jackson
- Manager: None (Note: Albion did not have a secretary-manager until 1890 and did not appoint a full-time manager until 1948.)
- Stadium: Stoney Lane
- FA Cup: Runners-up
- Birmingham Senior Cup: Winners
- Staffordshire Senior Cup: Winners
- Top goalscorer: League: N/A (Note: There was no league football in England until 1888–89.); All: George Woodhall (13) (Note: Includes all matches in the FA Cup and Staffordshire Senior Cup, as well as the Birmingham Senior Cup from the third round onwards.) (Note: Full details of the first two rounds of the Birmingham Senior Cup, which were contested by Albion's reserve team, are not available and thus not included in the statistics.)
- Highest home attendance: 8,137 (vs Old Carthusians, 23 January 1886)
- Lowest home attendance: 800 (vs Stoke Free Wanderers, 30 January 1886)
- Average home league attendance: 3,953
Home colours

The 1885–86 season was the eighth season in the history of West Bromwich Albion Football Club. In what was their inaugural season as a professional club, Albion moved to the Stoney Lane ground after leaving their previous home at Four Acres. The team also changed the colour of its kit, wearing blue and white striped jerseys for the first time. As league football had not been introduced in England at the time, the team competed solely in cup competitions and friendly matches throughout the season, playing 52 matches in total.

West Bromwich Albion won two regional cup competitions in 1885–86. They defeated Walsall Swifts by a single goal in the replayed final of the Birmingham Senior Cup, while in the Staffordshire Senior Cup a replay was again required as Stoke were beaten 4–2 following a goalless draw in the original tie. Albion also progressed through seven rounds to reach the FA Cup Final for the first time, becoming the first Midlands team to do so. However, after initially drawing 0–0 with Blackburn Rovers, they lost 2–0 in the replay.

== Off the field ==
Football was an amateur game until July 1885, when the Football Association decided to legalise payments to players. West Bromwich Albion held a committee meeting the following month, at which it was decided that the club should become professional. Albion's first professionals earned 10 shillings (50 pence) per week, with no training allowance provided.

After deciding not to renew the lease on the Four Acres, Albion moved to their fifth ground, Stoney Lane, in time for the 1885–86 season. The ground was located close to the Plough and Harrow public house, which served as the club's headquarters at the time. Albion took out an initial seven-year lease on the Stoney Lane site, paying an annual rent of £28 to its owner, a local undertaker named Mr Webb. The pitch was returfed and levelled, with ashes spread around the perimeter, and a wooden grandstand was built that came to be known as 'Noah's Ark'. The ground cost £370 to build, a sum that was offset by a number of friendly matches that took place early in the season.

During their early years, West Bromwich Albion had played in whatever coloured kit was available locally. However, at a committee meeting held in September 1885, the club decreed that blue and white striped jerseys should be adopted on a permanent basis. With the exception of a brief trial of scarlet and blue broad stripes early in the 1889–90 season, the team have worn these colours ever since, although initially the blue was of a lighter shade; the navy blue stripes were not introduced until after the First World War.

Due to the club's financial situation, the reserve team had their wages halved early on in the season, and by January 1886 the payments made to reserve players were withdrawn altogether, although there was a possibility of them receiving a bonus at the end of the season if funds permitted. This resulted in Albion's second team refusing to play against Small Heath Alliance and the game was cancelled. Some of the players were suspended as a result of their actions, but were later re-instated.

== FA Cup ==
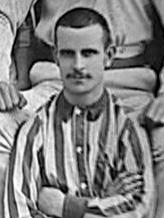
Jem Bayliss scored Albion's first FA Cup hat-trick.

In their third season in the FA Cup, West Bromwich Albion were drawn at home in every round prior to the semi-final. In the first two rounds, they defeated Aston Unity 4–1 and Wednesbury Old Athletic 3–2. The team then received a bye to the fourth round, where they beat Wolverhampton Wanderers by a 3–1 scoreline. Old Carthusians were defeated by a single goal in the fifth round. A hat-trick from Jem Bayliss—the first by an Albion player in the FA Cup—contributed to a 6–0 quarter-final victory over Old Westminsters, putting the club into the FA Cup semi-final for the first time.

The semi-final took place at Aston Lower Grounds and was against one of Albion's local rivals, Small Heath Alliance. Albion won 4–0—Arthur Loach and George Woodhall each scoring twice—to become the first Midlands club to reach the FA Cup Final. After the game, Small Heath supporters invaded the pitch and then pelted missiles at vehicles bound for West Bromwich, causing several injuries. In the final, Albion met holders Blackburn Rovers at the Kennington Oval, drawing 0–0. No extra time was played, so a replay was arranged at Derby Cricket Ground, the first time that an FA Cup Final match had taken place outside London. Albion were beaten 2–0 as Rovers lifted the FA Cup for the third year in succession. This was the first of three successive FA Cup Finals in which West Bromwich Albion participated.

Round	Date	Opponent	Venue	Result (Note: West Bromwich Albion's score is listed first, regardless of the venue or result.)	Goalscorers	Attendance
1	31 October 1885	Aston Unity	H	4–1	T Green 2, Woodhall 2	4,027
2	21 November 1885	Wednesbury Old Athletic	H	3–2	Loach 2, G Bell	3,578
3	Albion received a bye to round four					
4	2 January 1886	Wolverhampton Wanderers	H	3–1	G Bell, T Green, Loach	5,196
5	23 January 1886	Old Carthusians	H	1–0	G Bell	8,137
6	13 February 1886	Old Westminsters	H	6–0	Bayliss 3, G Bell 2, Woodhall	5,884
SF	6 March 1886	Small Heath Alliance	N	4–0	Loach 2, Woodhall 2	4,100
F	3 April 1886	Blackburn Rovers	N	0–0	—	15,156
F(R)	10 April 1886	Blackburn Rovers	N	0–2	—	16,144

Source for match details:

== Birmingham Senior Cup ==
Due to a congested fixture list, Albion fielded a reserve side in the first two rounds of their fifth Birmingham Senior Cup campaign, beating Sparkhill Alliance 6–0 and Burton Swifts 4–1. Tommy Green scored a hat-trick in the third round match away at Notts Rangers, as Albion ran out 7–2 winners. Burslem Port Vale were defeated 5–0 in the semi-final, which took place at a neutral venue, Aston Lower Grounds. The team drew 1–1 with Walsall Swifts in the final, which was also at Aston Lower Grounds. The replay took place at the same venue and George Woodhall scored the only goal of the game as Albion won the trophy for the first time.

Round	Date	Opponent	Venue	Result	Goalscorers	Attendance
1	1885	Sparkhill Alliance	?	6–0	?	?
2	1885	Burton Swifts	?	4–1	?	?
3	5 December 1885	Notts Rangers	A	7–2	Woodhall, T Green 3, Loach 2, G Bell	520
SF	16 January 1886	Burslem Port Vale	N	5–0	T Green 2, Timmins, Loach, Bunn	3,000
F	13 March 1886	Walsall Swifts	N	1–1	T Green	4,000
F(R)	12 April 1886	Walsall Swifts	N	1–0	Woodhall	10,000

Source for match details:

== Staffordshire Senior Cup ==
Albion, taking part in the Staffordshire Senior Cup for the fourth time, defeated Stafford Rangers 4–0 in the first round replay (following a goalless draw). In round two, a George Woodhall hat-trick helped to achieve a 5–2 win against Leek, after which Albion were handed a bye to the fourth round. They then beat Stoke Free Wanderers 5–0, while in the semi-final Burton Wanderers were defeated 3–0 at Stoke's Victoria Ground. The final took place at the same venue as Stoke themselves provided the opposition. The match finished goalless and Albion won the replay 4–2 at Stoney Lane in front of 5,500 supporters. Two goals from Jem Bayliss and one each from Tommy Green and George Woodhall gave Albion their second victory in the competition.

Round	Date	Opponent	Venue	Result	Goalscorers	Attendance
1	24 October 1885	Stafford Rangers	H	0–0	—	3,000
1(R)	7 November 1885	Stafford Rangers	A	4–0	Loach 2, G Bell 2	2,500
2	9 January 1886	Leek	H	5–2	Loach, Woodhall 3, G Bell	1,000
3	Albion received a bye to round four					
4	30 January 1886	Stoke Free Wanderers	H	5–0	G Bell, Bayliss, Loach, Woodhall 2	800
SF	17 April 1886	Burton Wanderers	N	3–0	Bayliss 2, T Green	6,000
F	3 April 1886	Stoke	A	0–0	—	3,000
F(R)	10 May 1886	Stoke	H	4–2	Bayliss 2, T Green, Woodhall	5,500

Source for match details:

== Friendlies and benefit matches ==
After the move to Stoney Lane, Albion held four exhibition games to help cover the cost of the ground. The first of these was a 4–1 win against Third Lanarkshire Rifle Volunteers on 5 September 1885, (Note: Willmore (p. 19.) records the date of the game as 4 September.) in front of 2,122 spectators. Tommy Green scored a hat-trick, including the first goal to be scored at Stoney Lane. As league football had yet to be established, the club also played in a number of other friendly matches throughout the season. Their 31 friendly matches included 21 wins and 9 defeats, while one match against Bolton Wanderers was abandoned with the game still scoreless. Albion's joint biggest friendly victories of the season were their 7–0 wins against Small Heath Alliance, Aston Unity and Halliwell. The season's heaviest friendly defeat was the 0–7 reverse at home to Preston North End. Albion also took part in the Walsall Senior Cup and Birmingham Charity Cup, but entered a reserve team for both competitions.

Date	Opponent	Venue	Result
27 July 1885	Wednesbury Old Athletic	A	0–1
22 August 1885	Small Heath Alliance	A	7–0
5 September 1885	Third Lanarkshire Rifle Volunteers	H	4–1
12 September 1885	Aston Villa	H	5–0
19 September 1885	Birmingham Excelsior	H	4–2
21 September 1885	Walsall Swifts	A	0–3
26 September 1885	Wednesbury Old Athletic	H	2–1
3 October 1885	Northwich Victoria	A	1–2
5 October 1885	Great Bridge Unity	A	4–0
10 October 1885	Blackburn Olympic	A	3–2
17 October 1885	Stoke	H	3–1
2 November 1885	Wolverhampton Wanderers	H	3–0
14 November 1885	Notts County	A	3–4
23 November 1885	Burnley	H	0–3
28 November 1885	Aston Villa	A	5–4
12 December 1885	Derby Midland	A	5–3
19 December 1885	Aston Unity	H	7–0
26 December 1885	Blackburn Olympic	H	4–0
28 December 1885	Bolton Wanderers	H	0–0 (Note: Match abandoned)
6 February 1886	Aston Villa	H	3–2
20 February 1886	Nottingham Forest	H	1–0
27 February 1886	Derby Junction	H	5–0
20 March 1886	Notts County	H	3–0
27 March 1886	Stoke	A	3–1
19 April 1886	Aston Villa (Note: Benefit match for Albion and Villa players)	A	1–3
26 April 1886	Halliwell	H	7–0
1 May 1886	Preston North End	H	0–7
8 May 1886	Blackburn Rovers	H	2–5
15 May 1886	Preston North End	H	1–0
22 May 1886	Bolton Wanderers	A	1–3
29 May 1886	Aston Villa	H	3–1

Source for match details:

== See also ==
- 1885–86 in English football
