= 1881–82 Birmingham Senior Cup =

Tournament details
- Country: England
- Venue: Midlands

Final positions
- Champions: Aston Villa
- Runners-up: Wednesbury Old Athletic

The 1881–82 Birmingham Senior Cup was the 6th season of the Birmingham Senior Cup, the oldest county cup competition still active and the third oldest in the world overall. Aston Villa beat Wednesbury Old Athletic 2–1.

The Derby Midland Club was founded in 1881 as the works side of the Midland Railway, and instantly caused attention as the Derby Town captain Evans, as an employee of the railway, played for the Midland against the Town in the first round of the 1881–82 Birmingham Senior Cup. Even more startlingly the Midland men won the tie 2–0. Midland made it through to the quarter-final of the competition before bowing out to holders Walsall Swifts at the Aston Lower Grounds; Midland was 4–0 down at one stage, but were stronger in the closing stages, and pulled the game back to 4–2 before time ran out.

== Albion ==
West Bromwich Albion took part in the Birmingham Senior Cup for the first time and were drawn away from home in the first four rounds. The club played their first recorded competitive match on 12 November 1881, winning 3–2 against Calthorpe. Albion then defeated Elwells and Fallings Heath, though the goalscorers for the first three rounds were not recorded. There followed a 5–2 fourth round victory over Notts Rangers. The semi-final took place at Aston Lower Grounds and was against Wednesbury Old Athletic. Billy Bisseker and Harry Aston scored for Albion but Wednesbury won 3–2.

Round	Date	Opponent	Venue	Result	Goalscorers	Attendance
1	12 November 1881	Calthorpe	A	3–2	?	1,000
2	10 December 1881	Elwells	A	2–1	?	800
3	21 January 1882	Fallings Heath	A	3–1	?	1,200
4	18 February 1882	Notts Rangers	A	5–2	Stokes, Bisseker, Whitehouse, Aston 2	500
SF	25 March 1882	Wednesbury Old Athletic	N	2–3	Bisseker, Aston	1,000

Source for match details:
