= 1881–82 West Bromwich Albion F.C. season =

West Bromwich Albion
1881–82 season
- Chairman: None (Note: Albion did not have a chairman until 1885.)
- Manager: None (Note: Albion did not have a secretary-manager until 1890 and did not appoint a full-time manager until 1948.)
- Stadium: Bunn's Field (a.k.a. The Birches)
- Birmingham Senior Cup: Semi-final
- Top goalscorer: League: N/A (Note: There was no league football in England until 1888–89.); All: Harry Aston (3) (Note: Includes matches in the Birmingham Senior Cup fourth round and semi-final only. Goalscorers from earlier rounds are not available.)
Home colours	Away colours

The 1881–82 season was the 4th season of West Bromwich Albion Football Club. For this season only, Albion played their home matches at their third ground, Bunn's Field, which became known as The Birches. 1881–82 was Albion's first season of competitive football: the club entered the Birmingham Senior Cup for the first time, reaching the semi-finals.

== Birmingham Senior Cup ==
Albion took part in the Birmingham Senior Cup for the first time and were drawn away from home in the first four rounds. The club played their first recorded competitive match on 12 November 1881, winning 3–2 against Calthorpe. Albion then defeated Elwells and Fallings Heath, though the goalscorers for the first three rounds were not recorded. There followed a 5–2 fourth round victory over Notts Rangers. The semi-final took place at Aston Lower Grounds and was against Wednesbury Old Athletic. Billy Bisseker and Harry Aston scored for Albion but Wednesbury won 3–2.

Round	Date	Opponent	Venue	Result	Goalscorers	Attendance
1	12 November 1881	Calthorpe	A	3–2	?	1,000
2	10 December 1881	Elwells	A	2–1	?	800
3	21 January 1882	Fallings Heath	A	3–1	?	1,200
4	18 February 1882	Notts Rangers	A	5–2	Stokes, Bisseker, Whitehouse, Aston 2	500
SF	25 March 1882	Wednesbury Old Athletic	N	2–3	Bisseker, Aston	1,000

Source for match details:

== Friendly matches ==
With league football yet to be established, West Bromwich Albion took part in a number of friendly matches throughout the season. Billy Bisseker scored five goals in the 12–0 win against Milton. The record of the club's matches during their early years is not complete, thus several of the scores are missing.

Date	Opponent	Venue	Result
10 September 1881	Oldbury	H	5–1
1 October 1881	The Grove	A	2–3
8 October 1881	Milton	H	12–0
5 November 1881	Milton	A	3–0 (Note: Match abandoned after 35 minutes when the ball burst.)
19 November 1881	Walsall Unity	A	— (Note: Score not recorded.)
26 November 1881	The Grove	H	2–4
3 December 1881	Nechells	H	9–1
17 December 1881	Walsall Alma Athletic	H	—
24 December 1881	Wednesfield Rovers	H	—
7 January 1882	Brunswick Wheel Works	A	2–1
14 January 1882	Fallings Heath Rangers	H	—
28 January 1882	Stourbridge	H	—
4 February 1882	West Bromwich Rovers	H	6–1
25 February 1882	Fallings Heath Rangers	H	5–0
4 March 1882	St Luke's	H	10–0
11 March 1882	Nechells	A	—
9 April 1882	Aston Unity	A	2–3

Source for match details:

== See also ==
- 1881–82 in English football
