= WTFC =

WTFC can refer to one of the following association football clubs:

English clubs:

- Wadebridge Town F.C.
- Walsall Town F.C., one of two clubs that merged to form Walsall F.C.
- Wantage Town F.C.
- Warrington Town F.C.
- Whitby Town F.C.
- Whitstable Town F.C.
- Wimborne Town F.C.
- Witham Town F.C.
- Wivenhoe Town F.C.
- Worksop Town F.C.

Nigerian club:

- Wikki Tourists F.C.

Northern Irish club:

- Warrenpoint Town F.C.
