= James Whitehouse (disambiguation) =

James Whitehouse may refer to:

- Jack Whitehouse (1861-1933), (James William Whitehouse), English footballer
- Jimmy Whitehouse (footballer, born 1873) (1873-1934), English footballer
- Jimmy Whitehouse (footballer, born 1924) (1924-2005), English footballer
- Jimmy Whitehouse (footballer, born 1934) (1934-2022), English footballer
