= Aston Unity F.C. =

- Full name: Aston Unity Football Club
- Nicknames: Unity, the Unitarians
- Founded: 1874
- Dissolved: 1908
- Ground: Aston Park
Original colours

Aston Unity Football Club was an association football club from Aston, now in Birmingham. The club was one of the first clubs in Birmingham and entered the FA Cup a number of times in the 1880s.

== History ==
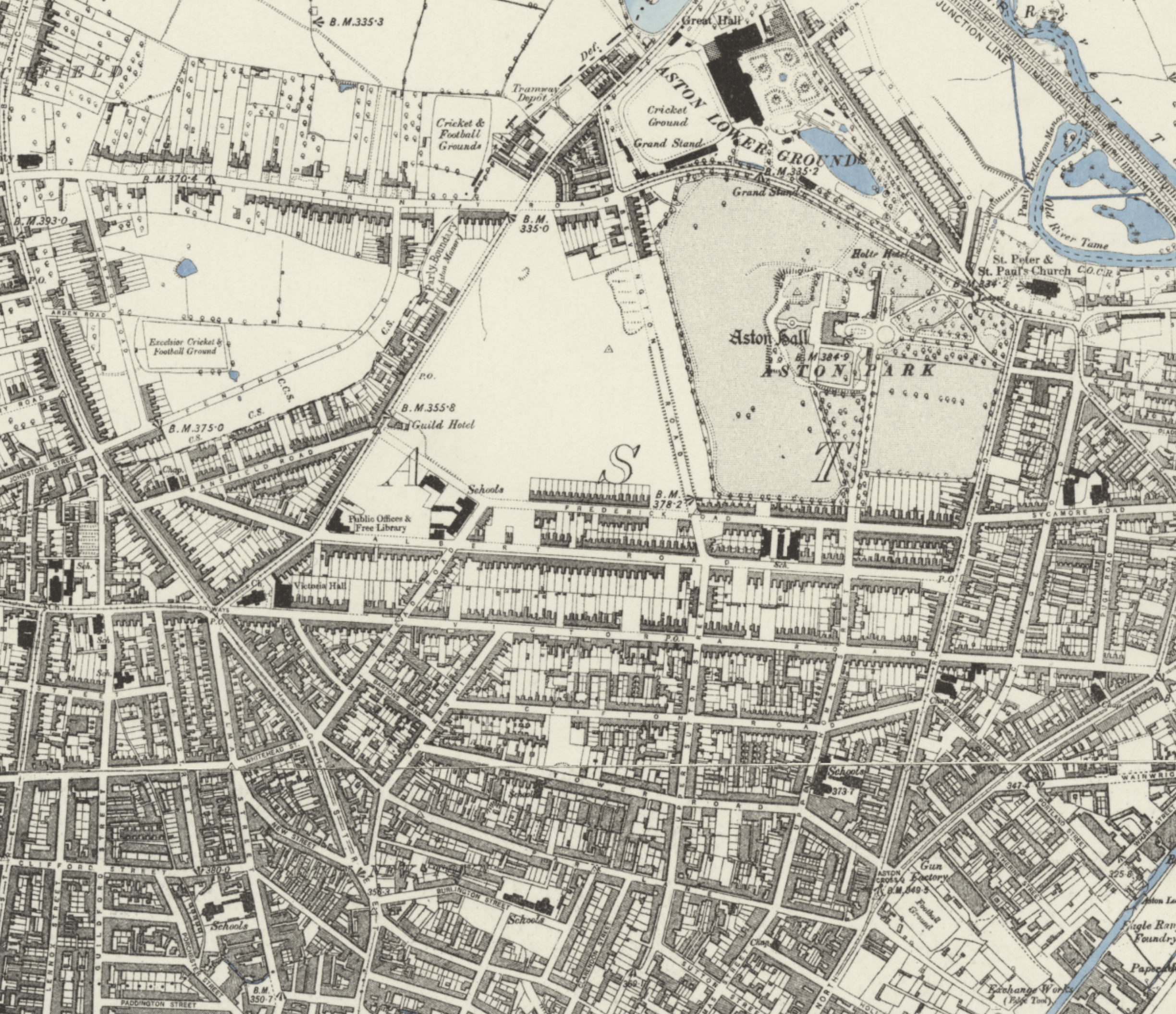
1889 map showing the locations of four of the football clubs in Aston: Excelsior's Fentham Road (left), Aston Unity's Trinity Road (top middle), Birmingham C&FC's Aston Lower Grounds (top right), Aston Shakespeare's Aston Cross (bottom right).

The club was founded by members of the Aston Unity cricket club, as a winter activity to keep them fit. The cricket club was founded in 1868, and the cricketers started to play football matches in the winter of 1874–75, at the instance of Sam Durban, the cricket captain and motive force for cricket - and later football - in Birmingham. In its first season, the club played home matches at Aston Park, had 39 members, and won 4 and drew 1 of the five matches in its first season., At the time the club was called Aston Park Unity. In January 1875 one match became Aston Villa’s first recorded game.

For 1875–76 the club had a second team. Before the 1876–77 season the club left Aston Park and changed its name to Aston Unity.

The club was a founder member of the Birmingham & District Football Association and played in the first Birmingham Senior Cup in 1876–77, losing to Saltley College in the first round after a replay. In 1878–79 the club beat Aston Villa in the first round of the competition, in front of a crowd of 1,700 at the Trinity Ground.

Unity's best run in the Birmingham Cup, at the time the second-most prestigious tournament for football clubs in the Midlands, came in 1879–80, the club beating Small Heath Alliance and St George's (the latter 9–1 away from home), before losing to Villa at the Aston Lower Grounds in the third round (in that year's competition, the last six); because of Villa's predatory poaching of players in the area, and importation of Scots shamateurs, "partisanship on both sides ran high", and Unity played a more brutal game than normal, Villa's Eli Davis having to go off injured, but the ten men won with a late goal from George Ramsay. The club's only final came in the Wednesbury Charity Cup in 1882, Unity losing to the defending champions Wednesbury Old Athletic, in a replay held in torrential conditions; Unity had come within three minutes of winning the original tie, only to concede a late equalizer in the final after a defensive mis-kick.

In the 1882–83 season, Unity entered the FA Cup for the first time, and obtained a bye through the first round. The club beat "the coming club" St George's 3–1 in the second, at the Pickwick Cricket Ground, but lost to Villa by the same stage in the third, at the latter's Wellington Road ground, in front of a crowd of 4–5,000.

However, as the season progressed, the now-professional Aston Villa had built up a squad made of the strongest players in the district, while Unity stayed within the FA rules on amateurism. Villa outpaced Unity by such a degree that, six weeks after the close FA Cup tie, in the fourth round of the Birmingham Senior Cup, Villa beat Unity at the Aston Lower Grounds by 16 goals to 0. Ten of the goals were scored by Arthur Brown, who had left Unity for Villa earlier in the season, and had persuaded a number of team-mates to join him.

The club entered the FA Cup in the next four years, but suffered heavy defeats in the first round on each occasion. Its financial situation was such that it sold home advantage to Derby County F.C. in 1886–87, and lost 4–1, playing for 70 minutes with ten men due to injury. Unity's last match in the competition was in 1887–88, losing 6–1 to Small Heath Alliance. When the Football Association introduced qualifying rounds in 1888–89, Unity stopped entering senior competition; the club was "a cricket club first and a football club next", and had "great difficulty" in raising a football team "owing to the way in which the promising young players trained in the club have been snapped up by wealthier organisations. At length they have grown tired of acting the lion's [Aston Villa's] provider...most of the Unity football members have joined that club with the object of playing for the reserve team".

The club continued playing football at a junior level until 1908, when the Trinity Road ground was closed, and continues as a cricket club to the present day.

== Colours ==
The club's colours were described as "blue stripes" or royal blue and white, with brown stockings,, until 1886, when they were described as red and black. Its last known colours as a football club (in 1888) were black and white stripes.

The cricket club's colours are claret and blue, and the club claims that Aston Villa derived inspiration from those colours.

== Grounds ==
The club originally played at Aston Park, and in 1876–77 moved to Aston Lane, using the Witton Arms for its facilities; the ground was used for the first representative match between the Birmingham Football Association and the Sheffield Football Association. As the Aston Lane facilities were not up to scratch, the club played at the Aston Lower Grounds in 1882, then in 1883–84 the football club played at the Pickwick Cricket Ground in Camp Hill), while the cricket club used the Excelsior ground in Aston.

In 1884 both football and cricket clubs moved to a new enclosed ground at Trinity Road in Aston, paid for by George Kynoch. The Staffordshire County Cricket Club occasionally used it for matches as it was just on the Staffordshire side of the border with Warwickshire.

== Honours and records ==
FA Cup

- Best performance: 3rd round, 1882–83

Birmingham Senior Cup

- Best performance: last 6, 1879–80

Wednesbury Charity Cup:

- Runners-up 1882–83

Biggest win:

- 14–0 v Kidderminster Harriers, Birmingham Senior Cup, 1st round, 1 October 1887

Biggest defeat:

- 0–16 v Aston Villa, Birmingham Senior Cup, 3rd round, 10 February 1883

== Notable players ==
Arthur Brown, later Aston Villa's first international player

Tommy Green, Aston Villa's first goalscorer in the Football League

Jack Devey, Frankie Dawson, John Burton, Charlie Athersmith: all FA Cup winners with Aston Villa
