= Wednesbury Town F.C. =

Coordinates: 52°38′26.32″N 2°01′35.31″W

- Full name: Wednesbury Town Football Club
- Founded: 1883
- Dissolved: 1885
- Ground: Wood Green
- Secretary: Arthur Wisson, W. H. Haggett
Home colours

Wednesbury Town F.C. was the name of a football clubs based in Wednesbury, West Midlands, England.

== History ==
The first club referred to as "Wednesbury Town" changed its name in 1877 to Wednesbury Strollers F.C.. The instant club claimed a foundation date of 1879, but it only started as a separate club in 1883. It was formed by the reserve side of the Wednesbury Old Athletic F.C., which split from the parent club after a player disagreement, and therefore may have dated its foundation to the first games of the reserve side.

The club's first season was successful. It entered the FA Cup for the first time in 1883–84 and reached the fourth round. The club recorded a shock first round victory over West Bromwich Albion (2–0), and followed it up with wins over Walsall Town (6–0 after a 2–2 draw, H. Wood scoring a hat-trick) and Derby Midland (1–0) before going out in the Fourth Round after a 5–0 defeat by Old Westminsters.

Town also reached the quarter-finals of the Birmingham Senior Cup in 1883–84, losing 5–3 to Aston Villa at the Aston Lower Grounds.

The club's finest moment however came towards the end of the season, when it won the Wednesbury Charity Cup, beating some of the best sides in the Midlands; the Old Athletic by 4–0, Birmingham St George's 3–1, Walsall Swifts 3–0, and, in the final, Nottingham Forest 3–0, after a replay.

The following season was less successful. The club went out of the FA Cup and Birmingham Senior Cup by 4–1 defeats to Aston Villa, in the first round in the former tournament and the third round of the latter. En route to the third round the club beat the Strollers, who were of course formerly Wednesbury Town, 5–0.

The final match of the club seems to have been a 5–1 defeat at Leek F.C. in March 1885. At the end of the 1884–85 season, the club merged back with Wednesbury Old Alliance, its players joining the Old Uns' set-up.

The name was revived for a new club in 2002 which joined West Midlands (Regional) League Division One North. The team played at Long Lane Park, Long Lane, Essington, Wolverhampton where it shared a pitch with Riverway. For the 2008–09 season, they were members of the West Midlands (Regional) League Division One, but resigned during the season.

== Colours ==
The club wore red and white jerseys with blue knickers.

== Ground ==
The club played at Wood Green, also the Strollers' ground, with facilities available on site.

== Honours ==
Wednesbury Charity Cup

- Winners: 1883–84
