= Alf Jones (footballer, born 1861) =

English footballer

Personal information
- Full name: Alfred George Jones
- Date of birth: 1861
- Place of birth: Walsall, England
- Date of death: 1935 (aged 74)
- Place of death: Walsall, England
- Position: Full back

Senior career*
Years	Team	Apps	(Gls)
–1883	Walsall Swifts		
1883	Great Lever		
1883–1885	Walsall Swifts		
1885	Burnley		
1885–1886	Aston Villa		
1886–1888	Walsall Town		
1888–1890	Walsall Town Swifts	36	(1)

International career
1882–1883	England	3	(0)
- * Club domestic league appearances and goals

Alfred George Jones (c. February 1861 – c. November 1935) was an English footballer who played as a full back. He was born in Walsall and represented the England national football team three times.

== Career ==
Jones was born in Walsall and played junior football in the Walsall area before signing with Walsall Swifts, going on to become the club's first player to gain international recognition.

His first cap came on 11 March 1882 against Scotland. Scotland won the match 5–1, with England's consolation goal coming from Howard Vaughton. Despite the size of the defeat, Jones was retained in defence for the next international match against Wales two days later. England were expected to claim a "comfortable victory", but the Welsh side "fought magnificently to secure a 5–3 victory", with Jones scoring an own goal in the 60th minute.

He left Walsall Swifts in early 1883 for a short spell with Great Lever in Bolton, during which he collected his third and final England cap in a 3–2 defeat by Scotland on 10 March 1883.

A return to Walsall Swifts followed in the summer of 1883 and two years later he joined Aston Villa via a short spell at Burnley. In 1885 when Jones and Scotland international Alex McLintock played for Burnley against a Blackburn Select XI, it was the first time that two international players had appeared in the same Burnley line-up.

He later returned to Walsall in 1886 when he joined Walsall Town, who then amalgamated with Walsall Swifts to form Walsall Town Swifts in 1888. Jones was an ever-present for the new Walsall club in both of their first two seasons; in 1888–89 he played 14 Midland Alliance fixtures and in 1889–90 he played 22 Football Alliance matches, scoring one goal. He holds a unique place in Walsall footballing history; being the only man to play for the Swifts, Town and Town Swifts teams.
