= 1879–80 Birmingham Senior Cup =

County cup

Tournament details
- Country: England
- Venue: Midlands

Final positions
- Champions: Aston Villa
- Runners-up: Saltley College

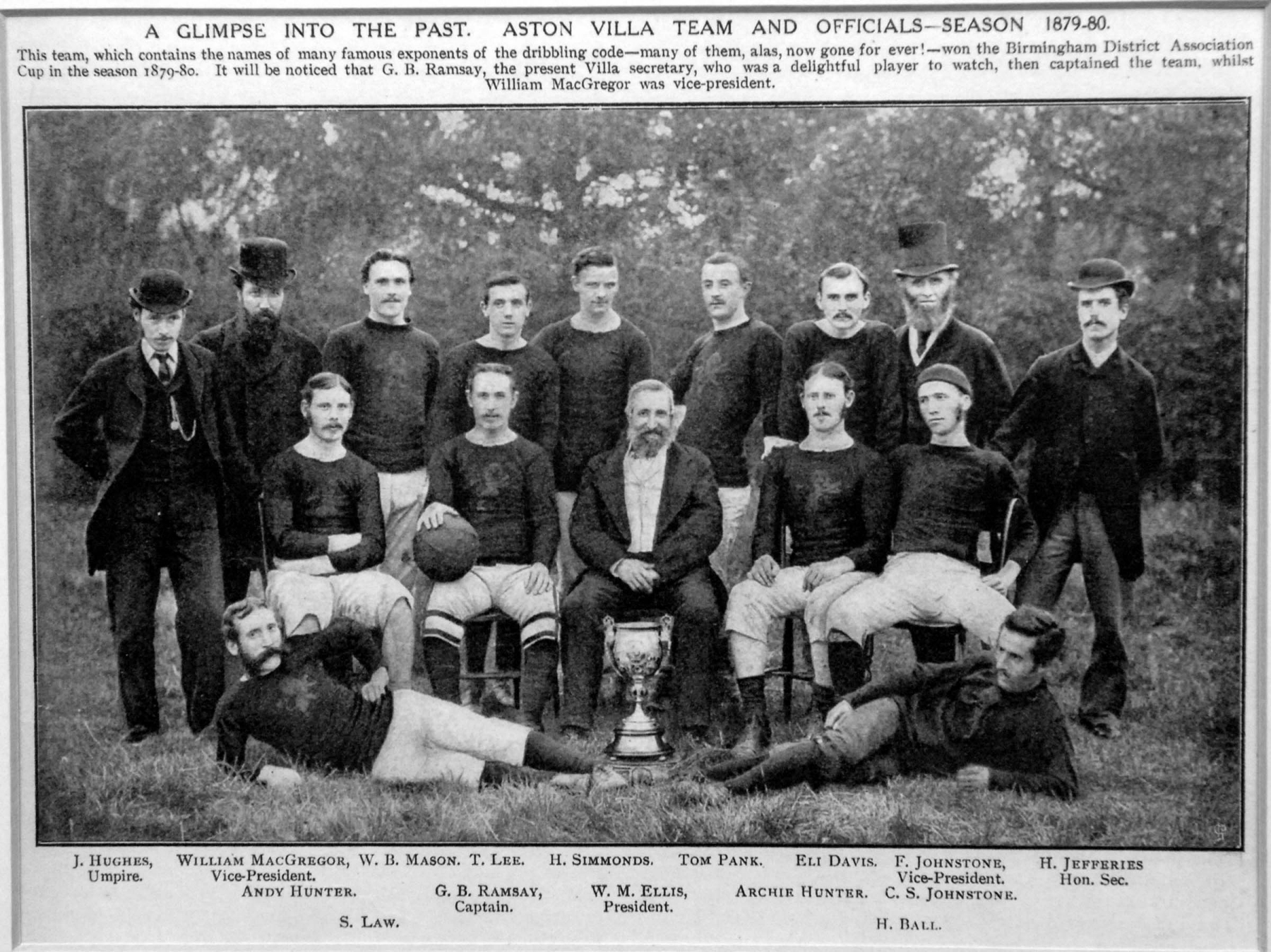
Winners Aston Villa display the cup

The 1879–80 Birmingham Senior Cup was the fourth season of the oldest county cup competition still active and the third oldest in the world overall. Aston Villa beat Saltley College 3–1 in the final.

Villa beat Excelsior 8–1 in the second round. On 14 February 1880, Aston Villa beat Newport (Salop) 7-0 in the third round and Walsall Swifts in the semi-finals.

The Saltley Collegians reached the final, beating Stoke in the third round, in a tie delayed to allow the students to return to college after a mid-term break. In the semi-finals the club lost 3–0 to Derby at the Aston Lower Ground, but a protest was made that one of the Derby players was "cup-tied", having already played for Wednesbury Strollers in the Sheffield Challenge Cup, against the rules of the competition which barred any player from representing more than one side in competitive matches. The protest was upheld and the college team put into the final, where it faced Aston Villa at the Aston Lower Grounds in what was seen as a "certainty" for the Villans; the Aston side duly won 3–1. The match was the college's high point in football.

Wednesbury Strollers reached the last six in 1879–80 losing heavily to the professional Walsall Swifts, by which time the Swifts were seen as the strongest side in Walsall. The semi-final stage (because of an inequality of entrants) had three teams, but Swifts were doubly unlucky with the draw – they missed out on the bye to the final, and were drawn to face Aston Villa, by then the strongest side in the Midlands. Villa duly won 2–1 in front of 6,000 at the Aston Lower Grounds, scoring twice in two minutes.

== First round ==
- Walsall Albion v Walsall White Star
- Calthorpe v Wednesbury Strollers
- St Thomas's v West Bromwich
- Saltley College v Birmingham
- All Saints v Aston Unity
- Oswestry v The Lily
- Rushall Rovers v Elwell's
- Fenton Sutherland v Rotton Park
- Wednesbury Athletic 1–2 Small Heath Alliance
- Hill Top Athletic v Stoke-on-Trent
- St John's Athletic 1–3 Aston Clifton
- Burslem (late Cobridge) 6–0 Westminster
- Walsall Swifts 14–0 Perry Athletic
- Excelsior v Arcadians
- St Luke's v Derby
- Aston Villa v Harborne Unity
- Christchurch v Shrewsbury Engineers
- Wretham 1–6 St George's Claremont
- Newport 6–1 Walsall Athletic
- Royal v St George's
- Harborne - bye

== Second round ==
- Aston Villa 8–1 Excelsior
- Walsall Albion 1–3 Wednesbury Strollers
- Walsall Swifts 5–0 Fenton Sutherland
- Small Heath Alliance v Aston Unity
- Burslem v St George's Claremont
- Oswestry v Derby Town
- Shrewsbury Engineers v Newport
- Harborne v Saltley College
- Elwell's v West Bromwich
- Aston Clifton v Stoke-on-Trent
- St George's – bye

== Third round ==
- St George's v Aston Unity
- Burslem/ St George's Claremont v Derby
- Walsall Swifts v Elwell's
- Aston Villa 7–0 Newport
- Saltley College v Stoke-on-Trent

== Fourth round ==
- Walsall Swifts v Wednesbury Strollers
- Aston Unity v Aston Villa
- Derby v Saltley College

== Semi-finals ==
- Aston Villa v Walsall Swifts
- Saltley College - bye
