= Wednesbury Charity Cup =

- Founded: 1879
- Abolished: 1991; 35 years ago
- Region: West Midlands
- Last champions: Cradley Town

The Wednesbury Charity Cup was an early football competition held from 1880 - eight years before the foundation of the Football League - for teams from the West Midlands region of England. The competition was conceived and initiated by Isaak Griffiths, a businessman and magistrate from Wednesbury. Money raised from the competition went to local causes.

== Trophy ==
Winners were awarded a solid silver trophy, on which the name of each year's winning team was engraved. The cup was made by Walker and Hall of Birmingham and hallmarked in 1879, and is topped by a figure of Charity It cost £100, paid for by public subscription.

The trophy weighs nearly 7 kilograms (15 lb) and is 2 feet 4 inches (71 cm) tall.

In 2016, a member of the public offered the trophy, in poor condition, to Bowjangles, a jewellery shop in Wednesbury, for scrap. Bowjanges owner Aaron Sheldon recognised its provenance and arranged for the trophy to be restored by Crescent Silver in Birmingham's Jewellery Quarter, a process which took five months. The newly-restored trophy was sold at auction by Cuttlestones Auctioneers and Valuers of Wolverhampton, on 2 December 2016, for £7,250.

The first name engraved on the trophy is "Stafford Road, Wolverhampton 1880" and the last "Cradley Town 1991".

== Winners ==
=== Key ===
| Season | Date | Winners | Result | Runner-up | Venue | Att. & Notes | Ref. |
|---|---|---|---|---|---|---|---|
| 1879–80 | 31 May 1880 | Stafford Road | 3–0 | Elwells | Wednesbury Oval | 2,000 | |
| 1880–81 | 26 February 1881 | Wednesbury Old Athletic | 3–1 | Stafford Road | Wednesbury Oval | "An immense number" | |
| 1881–82 | 27 May 1882 | Wednesbury Old Athletic | 3–2 | Aston Unity | Wednesbury Oval | "Very meagre". Replay. | |
| 1881–82 | 27 May 1882 | Wednesbury Old Athletic | 3–2 | Aston Unity | Aston Lower Grounds | Original tie 2–2. | |
| 1882–83 | 19 May 1883 | Nottingham Forest | 5–3 | West Bromwich Albion | Wellington Road | 4,000 | |
| 1883–84 | 17 May 1884 | Wednesbury Town | 3–0 | Nottingham Forest | | 1,400. Replay. | |
| 1883–84 | 17 May 1884 | Wednesbury Town | 3–0 | Nottingham Forest | | Original tie 2–2. | |
| 1884–85 | 16 May 1885 | Birmingham Excelsior | 5–0 | Birmingham St George's | Wellington Road | "Several hundreds." | |
| 1885–86 | 29 May 1886 | Walsall Town | 7–1 | Burton Strollers | Wednesbury Oval | "large" or "small" | |
| 1886–87 | 1987 | Wednesbury Old Athletic | | | | | |
| 1887–88 | 12 May 1888 | Wolverhampton Wanderers | 4–1 | Wednesbury Old Athletic | Molineux Stadium | | |
| 1888–89 | 1889 | Wednesbury Old Athletic | | | | | |
| 1889–90 | 1890 | Wednesbury Old Athletic | | West Bromwich Albion res. | | | |
| 1890–91 | 1891 | Wednesbury Old Athletic | | | | | |
| 1891–92 | 1892 | Singers | | | | | |
| 1893–94 | 1894 | West Bromwich Albion res. | 4–0 | Newport | Wellington | | |
| 1912–13 | 1913 | Walsall | | | | | |
| 1914–18 | 1913 | No competition due to World War I. | | | | | |
| 1920–21 | 1921 | Walsall | | | | | |
| 1921–22 | 1922 | Walsall | | | | | |
| 1922–23 | 1923 | Walsall | | | | | |
| 1968–69 | 1969 | Pelsall Villa | | | | | |
| 1969–70 | 1970 | Pelsall Villa | | | | | |
| 1973–74 | 1974 | Pelsall Villa | | | | | |
| 1979–80 | 1980 | Tipton Town | | | | | |
| 1980–81 | 1981 | Tipton Town | | | | | |
| 1981–82 | 1982 | Bilston Town | | | | | |
| 1982–83 | 1983 | Bilston Town | | | | | |
| 1984–85 | 1985 | Bilston Town | | | | | |
| 1988–89 | 1989 | Pelsall Villa | | | | | |
| 1990–91 | 1991 | Cradley Town | | | | | |
| 1990–91 | 1991 | Cradley Town | | | | | |
