= George Bell (footballer, born 1861) =

English footballer

Personal information
- Date of birth: 4 March 1861
- Place of birth: West Bromwich, England
- Date of death: May 1959 (aged 98)
- Place of death: West Bromwich, England
- Position: Outside left

Youth career
- 1878–1885: West Bromwich Albion (amateur)

Senior career*
| Years | Team | Apps | (Gls) |
| 1885–1888 | West Bromwich Albion | | |
| 1888–1890 | Kidderminster Harriers | | |
- * Club domestic league appearances and goals

George Bell (4 March 1861 – May 1959) was an English footballer who played at outside left. He was born in West Bromwich and worked at the local George Salter's Spring Works. Bell was one of the founders of the factory's football team, the West Bromwich Strollers, and played in the team's first recorded match, a 0–0 draw against Hudson's soap factory on 23 November 1878. He continued to play for the team following their change of name to West Bromwich Albion in 1879, playing alongside his cousin Harry Bell on several occasions.

He scored the winning goal in the 1883 Staffordshire Senior Cup Final to give Albion their first ever trophy. The following season saw Bell play in Albion's first FA Cup match, a 0–2 defeat to Wednesbury Town. He appeared in all of Albion's FA Cup games in 1885–86 as the club reached the final for the first time. He was on the losing side however, as Albion lost 0–2 to Blackburn Rovers in a replay. In 1887, West Bromwich Albion were FA Cup runners-up again, but Bell played in just one match during the cup run, scoring in a 2–1 second round victory over Derby Junction. Albion won their first FA Cup in 1888, but Bell did not play in any of the matches, and in June 1888 he joined Kidderminster Harriers, with whom he remained until May 1890.
