= Harry Bell (footballer, born 1862) =

English footballer

Personal information
- Date of birth: 18 April 1862
- Place of birth: West Bromwich, England
- Date of death: 18 January 1948 (aged 85)
- Place of death: Durban, South Africa
- Position: Full back

Youth career
- 1879–1885: West Bromwich Strollers (Note: West Bromwich Albion were founded as West Bromwich Strollers in 1879.) / West Bromwich Albion

Senior career*
Years	Team	Apps	(Gls)
1885–1887	West Bromwich Albion	0 (Note: Bell's playing career pre-dated league football.)	(0)
- * Club domestic league appearances and goals

Harry Bell (18 April 1862 – 18 January 1948) was an English footballer who played at full back. He was born in West Bromwich, and after attending Beeches Road School, worked at the local George Salter's Spring Works. He joined West Bromwich Albion in 1879, and turned professional (along with his teammates) in the summer of 1885. Bell retired in 1887 due to injury.
