= Fred Bunn =

English footballer

Personal information
- Full name: Abel Thomas Frederick Bunn
- Date of birth: 7 February 1861
- Place of birth: West Bromwich, England
- Date of death: 20 November 1921 (aged 60)
- Place of death: Southampton, England
- Position: Centre half

Senior career*
Years	Team	Apps	(Gls)
1879–1886	West Bromwich Albion		
1886–1887	Crosswell's Brewery		
1887–1888	Oldbury Town		
- * Club domestic league appearances and goals

Abel Thomas Frederick Bunn (7 February 1861 – 20 November 1921) was an English footballer who played at centre half. He was born in West Bromwich and attended Christ Church School, before working at the local George Salter's Spring Works. He played for West Bromwich Albion from September 1879 and scored in the 1883 Staffordshire Senior Cup Final as Albion won their first ever trophy. In 1885, Bunn became one of the club's first professionals when the FA legalised payments to players. He left the club the following year to join Crosswell's Brewery, after disagreements with some of the Albion committee members. He finished his career at Oldbury Town.
