= Chocolate (color) =

Tone of dark brown

Color coordinates
- Hex triplet: #7B3F00
- sRGB^{B} (r, g, b): (123, 63, 0)
- HSV (h, s, v): (31°, 100%, 48%)
- CIELCh_{uv} (L, C, h): (33, 57, 33°)
- Source: Maerz and Paul
- ISCC–NBS descriptor: Strong brown
- B: Normalized to [0–255] (byte)

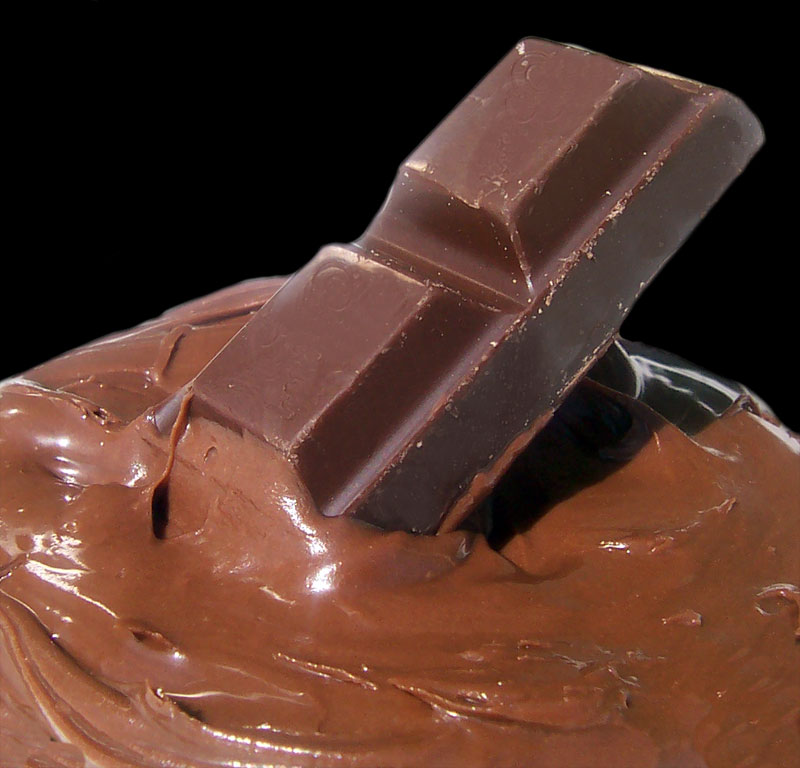
Molten chocolate and a piece of a chocolate bar

The color chocolate or cocoa brown is a shade of brown that resembles chocolate. At right is displayed the color traditionally called chocolate.

The first recorded use of chocolate as a color name in English was in 1737.

This color is a representation of the color of the most common type of chocolate, milk chocolate.

== Etymology ==
The word chocolate entered the English language from Spanish. How the word came into Spanish is less certain, and there are multiple competing explanations. Perhaps the most cited explanation is that "chocolate" comes from Nahuatl, the language of the Aztecs, from the word "chocolātl", which many sources derived from the Nahuatl word "xocolātl" made up from the words "xococ" meaning sour or bitter, and "ātl" meaning water or refreshment. However, as William Bright noted the word "chocolatl" does not occur in central Mexican colonial sources making this an unlikely derivation. Santamaria gives a derivation from the Yucatec Maya word "chokol" meaning hot, and the Nahuatl "atl" meaning water. More recently Dakin and Wichmann derive it from another Nahuatl term, "chicolatl" from Eastern Nahuatl meaning "beaten drink". They derive this term from the word for the frothing stick, "chicoli".

== Variations of chocolate ==
=== Cocoa brown (web color "chocolate") (light chocolate) ===
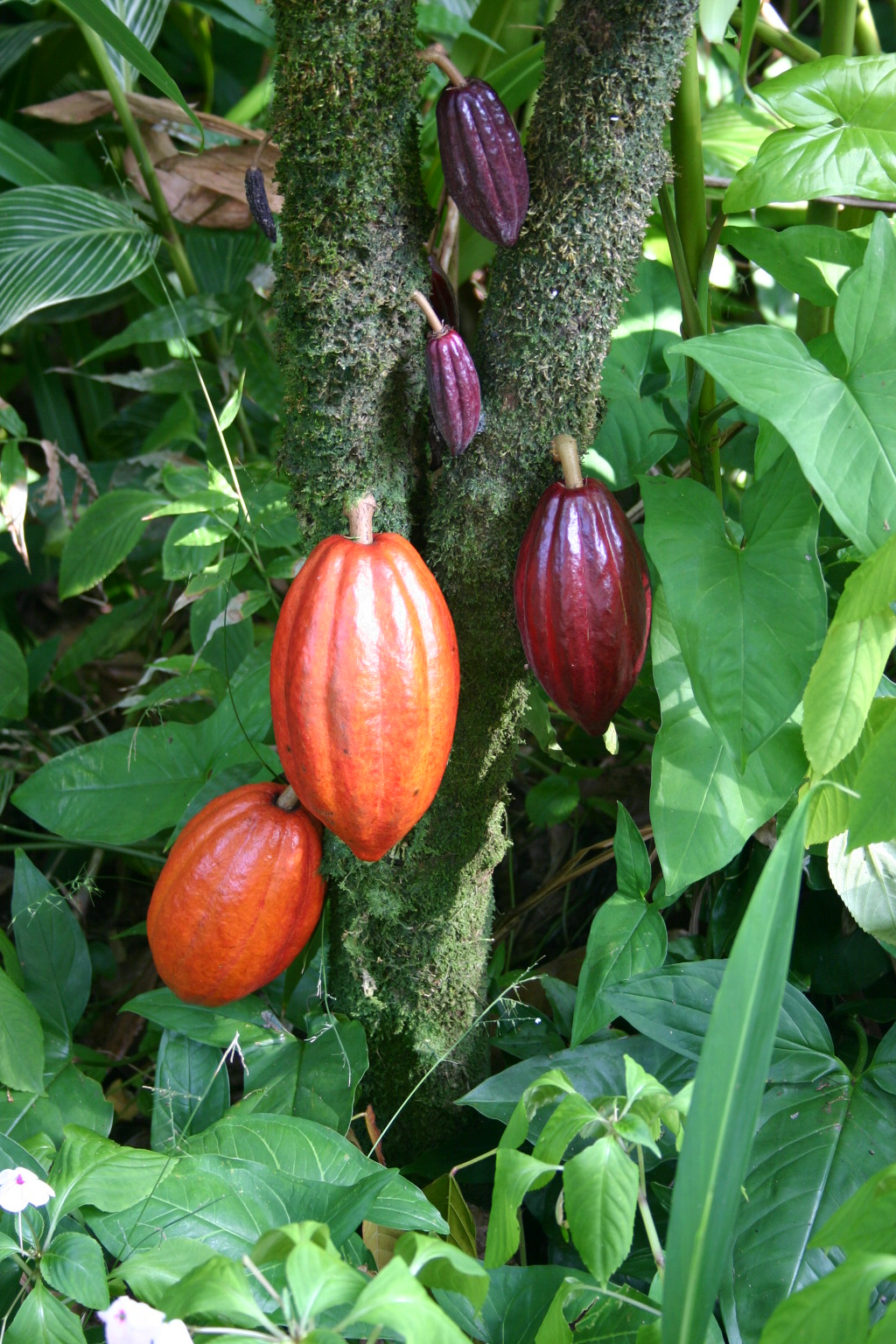
Chocolate is created from the cocoa bean. A cacao tree with cocoa bean fruit pods (which are filled with cocoa beans inside of them) in various stages of ripening

Cocoa Brown Cinnamon

Color coordinates
- Hex triplet: #D2691E
- sRGB^{B} (r, g, b): (210, 105, 30)
- HSV (h, s, v): (25°, 86%, 82%)
- CIELCh_{uv} (L, C, h): (56, 99, 29°)
- Source: X11
- ISCC–NBS descriptor: Deep orange
- B: Normalized to [0–255] (byte)

The web color called "chocolate" is displayed at right. This color is actually the color of the exterior of an unripe cocoa bean pod and is not the color of chocolate, a highly processed product, at all. The historical and traditional name for this color is cocoa brown.

The first recorded use of cocoa brown as a color name in English was in 1925.

This color may also be referred to as light chocolate or cinnamon.

=== Milk chocolate ===
Milk Chocolate
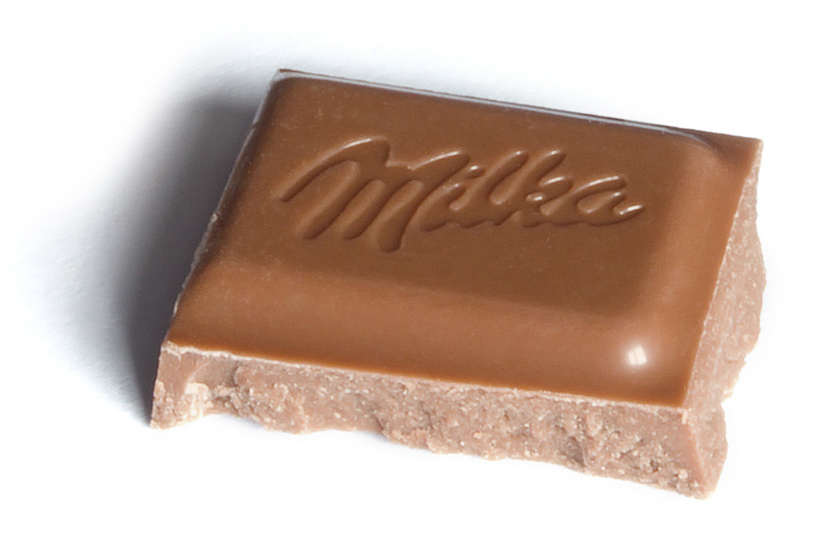
- A chunk of Milka

Color coordinates
- Hex triplet: #84563C
- sRGB^{B} (r, g, b): (132, 86, 60)
- HSV (h, s, v): (22°, 55%, 52%)
- CIELCh_{uv} (L, C, h): (41, 40, 34°)
- Source: Color Register
- B: Normalized to [0–255] (byte)

Milk chocolate is a moderate shade of brown representing the color of milk chocolate.

== Chocolate in human culture ==
Animals

- Dogs with a dark brown coat are considered to be chocolate colored. The most common breed is the Labrador Retriever

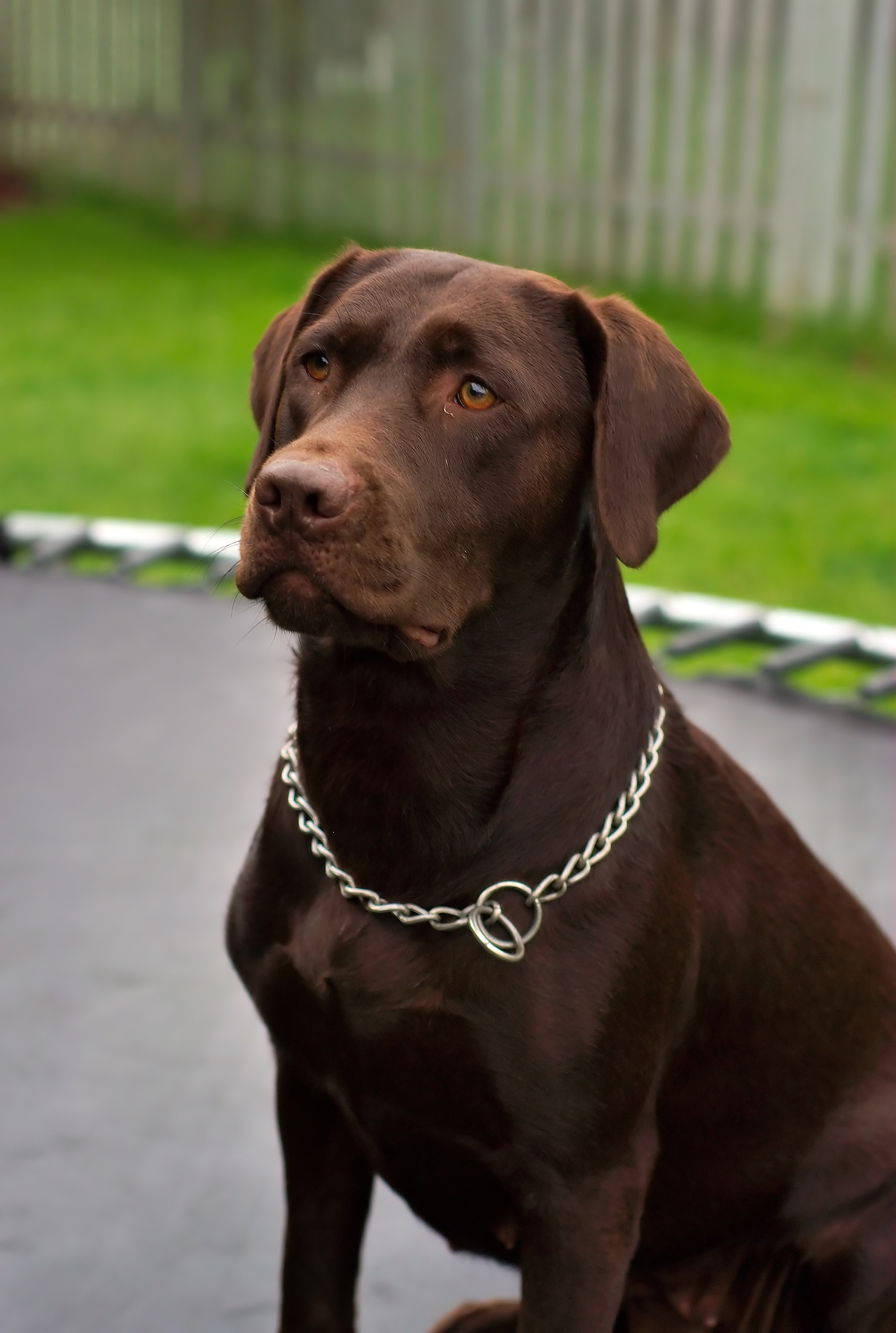
A chocolate Labrador

Ethnography

- Chocolate City is a name that, since the 1970s, has been applied in African American slang to Washington, D.C., because of its overwhelmingly African American population. Nowadays, it is also used to refer to the black neighborhood of a particular city, or the collectivity of black neighborhoods in urban areas throughout Northern America. The term is also used for websites, blogs, etc. that are designed to appeal to African Americans. For example, Chocolate City magazine is an "urban lifestyle and nightlife magazine" that features models, events, and celebrity interviews and pictures from Chicago and Oakland, California.

Geography

- The Chocolate Hills are located in the province of Bohol in the Philippines.
- The Chocolate Mountains are located in Imperial County and Riverside County in the Colorado Desert in Southern California, a region of California in the United States.
- There are also the Chocolate Mountains in Arizona, in the United States.
- There is a lake called Chocolate Lake in the city of Halifax, Nova Scotia, in Canada.

Music

- The Chocolate Watchband was a popular psychedelic music group during the Summer of Love. (See also the Strawberry Alarm Clock)
- Chocolate City is a 1975 album by the funk band Parliament. It has a theme of love of Washington, D.C., where the group was particularly popular.
- Chocolate Starfish were an Australian rock music group based in Melbourne, Australia, releasing a number of hits in the early 1990s, before disbanding in 1998.
- Chocolate Starfish and the Hot Dog Flavored Water is the third album by the nu metal band Limp Bizkit, released on 15 October 2000 through Interscope Records.
- Hot Chocolate was a British band that was popular during the 1970s and 1980s and famous for their song "You Sexy Thing".

Sport

- The color chocolate is part of the football kit worn by English National League football team Sutton United, alongside amber.

Television

- On the 2011 TV show The Playboy Club, Naturi Naughton played Bunny Brenda, who is seeking to be the first African American Playboy Playmate (the show takes place in the early 1960s, and at that time no African American had yet been chosen to be a Playboy Playmate.). She referred to herself on the show as the chocolate bunny.

== See also ==
- List of colors
- Vanilla (color)
