= Walsall Town F.C. =

Former association football club

- Full name: Walsall Town Football Club
- Nickname: the Town Club
- Founded: 1873
- Dissolved: 1888
- Ground: the Chuckery
- Secretary: J. Noake
Home colours

Walsall Town F.C. was an association football club from Walsall, then in Staffordshire, which in 1888 merged with Walsall Swifts to form the club which would become Walsall F.C.

== History ==
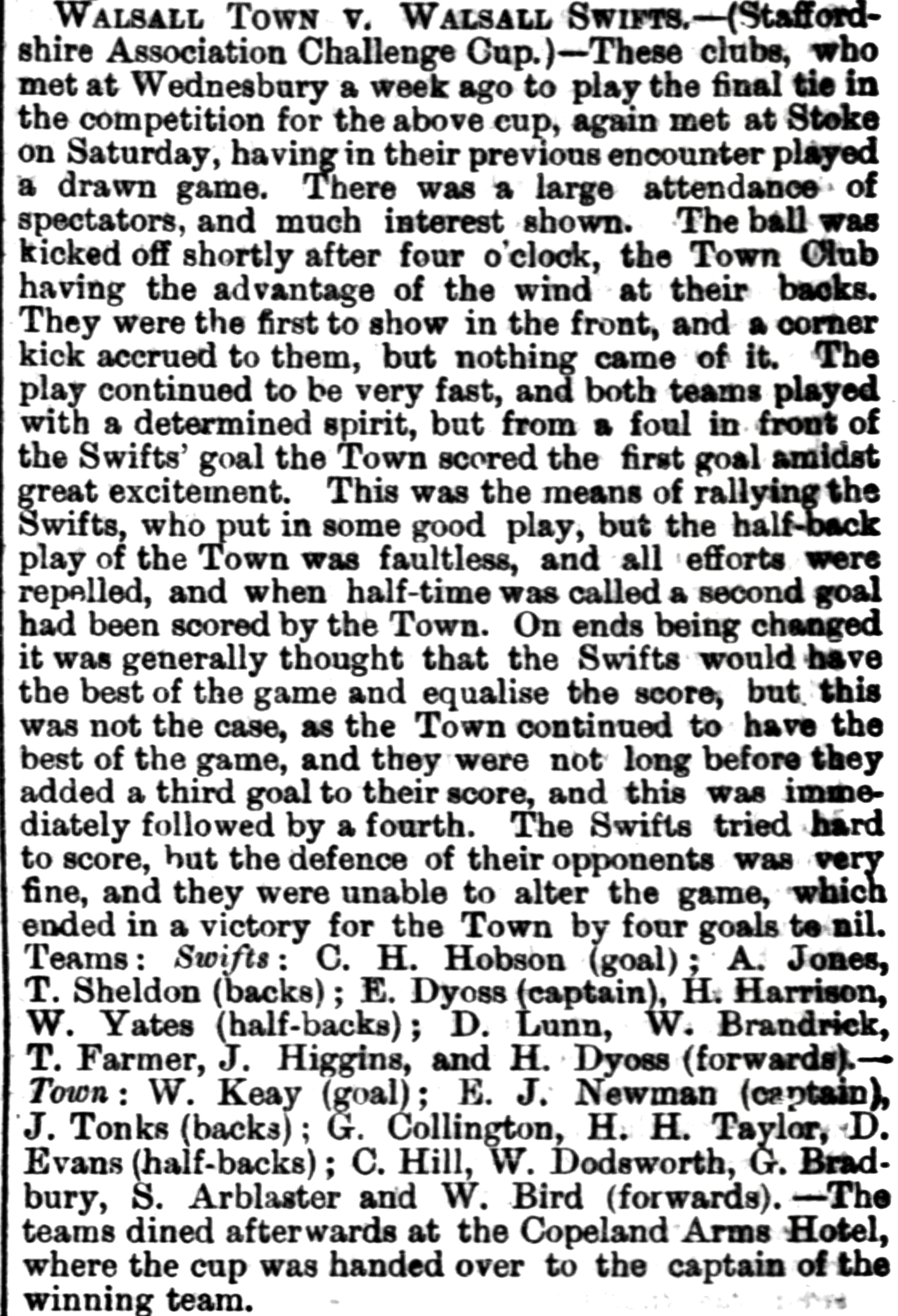
1881-82 Staffordshire Cup Final replay, Walsall Town 4–0 Walsall Swifts, Lichfield Mercury, 7 April 1882

The club was founded in November 1873 by members of the Walsall Cricket Club, under the simpler name Walsall Football Club. The club however did not play any other side until September 1874. By 1879, the club was called Walsall Town. Unlike the working men of Walsall Swifts, the Town side tended to come from the higher social strata, many of its players being former Queen Mary's Grammar School pupils, and (originally) played more for enjoyment than income, which meant that Walsall Swifts tended to generate higher support. Indeed Town's attitude to the other clubs in the area was such that it claimed the combined mass of other clubs in the town could barely match up to Town's second XI, resulting in the Walsall & District Association turning down Town's membership application in 1882; it was admitted in 1883.

=== Early competitions ===
Town entered the Birmingham Senior Cup for the first time in 1880–81, going out in the third round to its cross-town rivals the Swifts, who went on to win the competition. The two clubs both entered FA Cup for the first time in 1882–83, and Town had the better run, reaching the fourth round (last 15). At that stage, Town only lost 2–1 to Aston Villa, right-winger Hill having given Town the lead in the first minute. That however marked the club's best run in the competition, although the club was considered unlucky to lose 2–0 to the Villans in the 1884–85 FA Cup third round, with two goals questionably disallowed for offside.

The club's greatest successes came in the Staffordshire Senior Cup, which Town won for the first time in 1881–82, beating the Swifts in a replayed final. On Boxing Day 1882, the Town Club played at Blackburn Rovers in a friendly, and emerged with a startling 3–2 win, which led the local media to hail Town as "one of the best exponents of the game in the world".

=== Walsall Cup domination ===
Town finally entered the Walsall Senior Cup for the first time in 1883–84, and reached the Birmingham Senior Cup semi-finals in 1883–84 and 1884–85, beaten by Aston Villa and the Swifts respectively, but the latter season saw the club win the Staffordshire Cup for the second and final time, thanks to a 2–1 win over Wolverhampton Wanderers; it also won the Walsall Cup for the first time, beating Wednesbury Old Athletic in the final. Indeed, Town went on to win the next two Walsall Cups to claim a hat-trick of titles, the 1885–86 final win over the Swifts being particularly acriminous, with the Swifts' Allen breaking the leg of Town's Cope, resulting in "very strong opinions being expressed" and a collection being taken for Cope. The Swifts protested the result on the basis of crowd encroachment, and, after the Walsall FA voted in favour of a replay, Town successfully had the motion overturned, on the basis of the Swifts "packing" the vote with representatives who were not otherwise entitled to appear.

The increasing professionalism in the game however was causing problems for the Walsall clubs. In the first round of the 1885–86 FA Cup, three ex-Swifts players were found in the Aston Villa XI which faced Walsall Town at the Chuckery, and the resulting antagonism - and easy win for Villa - roused the crowd to violence, the Astonians having to run a gauntlet of stones to their brake, as well as a protest against Alf Jones being a "ringer". Shortly afterwards, the Town captain for the game, Gershom Cox, was also induced to join Villa, after a falling-out with the Town committee. Nevertheless, the club finished the season on a high, by taking the Wednesbury Charity Cup, hammering surprise finalists Burton Strollers 7–1 at the Wednesbury Oval. Town played in 6 finals of any prominence between 1882 and 1887, and won them all.

=== Merger ===
The first round of the 1887–88 FA Cup saw both eliminated at the first hurdle, and, given the choice of matches (as both Town and Swifts were playing on neighbouring pitches at the Chuckery), spectators had definitely chosen Swifts over Town; nearly 5,000 watched Swifts lose to Wolverhampton Wanderers, but under a thousand saw Town go down to Birmingham St George's. However, both clubs were in financial difficulties; Swifts because of a fall-off in support, Town because the previous club secretary had absconded with the club books.

Town's hand was forced after a 4–1 upset at the hands of Aston Shakespeare in the Dudley Charity Cup, the disastrous result against a third-rank side encouraging the directors to look to amalgamate with Swifts. On 22 February 1888, the clubs agreed to merge under the name Walsall Town Swifts and Town bowed out on 7 April 1888 with a 2–1 defeat at Wolverhampton Wanderers, the new Town-Swifts making its bow two days later in a 0–0 draw in the Birmingham Charity Cup against Aston Villa. There was one final sad duty for the club - to be represented at the funeral of its half-back Mr J. Lee, who had died of smallpox in May.

== Colours ==
The club started in white jerseys and blue caps, but quickly changed to blue and white hoops. In 1879, the club adopted white jerseys, with a blue armband to link to the previous schema. The armband was soon dropped and the club continued with plain white jerseys, retaining the blue as knickers and socks.

== Ground ==
The club's ground was at the Chuckery grounds, next to the cricket ground.

== Honours ==
- FA Cup
  - Best performance: 4th round, 1882–83
- Birmingham Senior Cup
  - Best performance: Semi-final, 1883–84, 1884–85
- Staffordshire Cup
  - Winner: 1881–82, 1884–85
- Walsall Cup
  - Winner: 1884–85, 1885–86, 1886–87
- Wednesbury Charity Cup
  - Winner: 1885–86

== Notable players ==
- Joe Wilson, who later won the FA Cup with West Bromwich Albion, played for the club in 1885–86
- Alf Jones, who had picked up international caps when playing for Walsall Swifts in the early 1880s, joined the club in 1886 and remained with the Town Swifts
