= Billy Bisseker =

English footballer

Personal information
- Full name: William Myles Bisseker
- Date of birth: 11 November 1863
- Place of birth: West Bromwich, England
- Date of death: 5 March 1902 (aged 38)
- Place of death: West Bromwich, England
- Position: Centre forward

Senior career*
Years	Team	Apps	(Gls)
1878–1884	West Bromwich Albion	0 (Note: Bisseker's playing career pre-dated league football.)	(0)
- * Club domestic league appearances and goals

William Myles Bisseker (11 November 1863 – 5 March 1902) was an English footballer who played as a centre forward. He was born in West Bromwich and attended Hill Top County School, before working at the local George Salter's Spring Works. He joined the factory's football team, the West Bromwich Strollers, in 1878 and continued to play for them after their change of name to West Bromwich Albion in 1879. On 29 January 1881, Bisseker scored Albion's first recorded hat-trick when he netted three times in the 5–0 friendly win against Hockley Belmont. During the following season he scored five goals in the 12–0 win against Milton (another friendly) and also scored in the Birmingham Senior Cup semi-final defeat to Wednesbury Old Athletic. In 1883 he played in Albion's first FA Cup match, also against Wednesbury Old Athletic. He served as the club's treasurer between 1882 and 1884 while still a player. Bisseker retired from playing football in May 1884 and later resumed work at George Salter's.
