= Arthur Loach =

English footballer

Personal information
- Full name: Arthur Albert Loach
- Date of birth: 8 November 1863
- Place of birth: West Bromwich, England
- Date of death: 9 February 1958 (aged 94)
- Place of death: Rhyl, Wales
- Position: Forward

Youth career
- 1882–1885: West Bromwich Albion (amateur)

Senior career*
Years	Team	Apps	(Gls)
1885–1886	West Bromwich Albion		
1886–1888	Aston Villa		
1888–1896	Rhyl		
- * Club domestic league appearances and goals

Arthur Albert Loach (8 November 1863 – 9 February 1958) was an English footballer who played as a forward.

He joined West Bromwich Albion in August 1882 and became one of the club's first professionals three years later when the FA legalised payments to players. He was on the losing side as Albion lost 0–2 to Blackburn Rovers in the 1886 FA Cup Final.

In May 1886 Loach moved to Aston Villa on a free transfer and remained there until joining Rhyl in August 1888. Loach retired from football in 1896 and went on to run a hotel in Rhyl.
