= Birmingham Charity Cup =

- Founded: 1881
- Abolished: 1964
- Region: West Midlands
- Teams: variable
- Last champions: Aston Villa Youths (49th title)
- Most championships: Aston Villa (49 titles)

The Lord Mayor of Birmingham's Charity Cup, commonly referred to as the Birmingham Charity Cup, was a football competition for teams from Birmingham and the surrounding area.

== History ==
It was inaugurated in 1882 by Joseph Cofield, a player with St George's and the secretary of the Birmingham and District Football Association, who had been voted a benefice of £30 by the association; Cofield promptly pledged it as the starting fund for a new trophy, to be played for charity. The trophy was duly presented by the city's mayor, Richard Chamberlain, to Aston Villa as the first winner of the competition in the 1881–82 season, defeating Walsall Swifts 4–1. From 1910 onwards, the preliminary rounds were scrapped and the final became an invitation match. Other than during the First World War, the competition took place every year until 1939 with the exception of the 1925–26 season, when it was abandoned due to the General Strike. It fluctuated between being contested at the start and the end of the football season.

The competition was discontinued after the Second World War, other than on two occasions in the 1960s when the youth teams of Aston Villa and Birmingham City competed for the trophy. After this, the competition was discontinued altogether and the trophy itself used for the Birmingham Senior Amateur Cup competition.

== Trophy ==
The trophy was made by Birmingham silversmith William Spurrer, and contained 14lbs of silver. It was surmounted by a figure of a footballer and bore shields engraved with the initials of Chamberlain and the members of the Birmingham County Football Association's committee at the time of the competition's inauguration, the city's coat of arms, and representations of its main industries. The main bowl of the trophy featured two engraved drawings, one of an 1880s football match, complete with top-hatted umpire, and one of "the poor and sick succoured by the heavenly spirit". The plinth had a number of shields engraved with the names of the winning teams, although for unknown reasons some were missing.

== Winners ==
Aston Villa were the most successful team in the competition's history, winning it on thirty occasions outright and sharing the trophy five times. The club's youth team also jointly won the trophy twice when it was briefly revived in the 1960s as a youth competition.

Date	Winner	Score	Runners–up	Venue	Attendance	Refs
6 May 1882	Aston Villa	4–1	Walsall Swifts	Aston Lower Grounds	6,000	
12 May 1883	Aston Villa	8–0	Walsall Swifts	Aston Lower Grounds	5,000	
26 April 1884	Aston Villa	3–2	Wednesbury Old Athletic	Aston Lower Grounds	10,000	
2 May 1885	Aston Villa	1-1	Walsall Swifts	Trinity Road, Aston Unity F.C.	5,000	
(R) 27 May 1885	Aston Villa	1-1 (Note: The trophy was shared.)	Walsall Swifts	The Chuckery	5,000	
17 May 1886	Aston Villa	4-1	Wednesbury Old Athletic	Wellington Road	2,000	
1887	Wolverhampton Wanderers	n/a (Note: Wolverhampton Wanderers were awarded the trophy when Aston Villa withdrew.)	Aston Villa			
14 April 1888	Aston Villa	6-2	Mitchell's St. George's	Aston Lower Grounds		
6 April 1889	Aston Villa	3–0	Wolverhampton Wanderers	Warwickshire County Cricket Ground	5,000	
3 May 1890	Aston Villa	2–1	Wolverhampton Wanderers	Stoney Lane	6,000	
9 May 1891	Aston Villa	3–0	Wolverhampton Wanderers	Stoney Lane	6,500	
7 May 1892	Wolverhampton Wanderers	2-1	Small Heath	Aston Lower Grounds		
29 April 1893	Aston Villa	3-2	Small Heath	Aston Lower Grounds	8,000	
28 April 1894	Aston Villa	3-1	Wolverhampton Wanderers	Aston Lower Grounds	6,000	
27 April 1895	Aston Villa	5–3	Small Heath	Aston Lower Grounds	5,000	
25 April 1896	Walsall	1–0	Sheffield United	Wellington Road	3,000	
24 April 1897	Walsall	1-1	Aston Villa	Villa Park	8,000	
(R) 30 April 1897	Walsall	1-1	Aston Villa	Villa Park	1,000	
4 October 1897	Aston Villa	4-2	Walsall	Villa Park	4,000	
17 October 1899	Aston Villa	1-0	Walsall	Villa Park	9,000	
13 November 1899	West Bromwich Albion	1–0	Walsall	Villa Park	8,250	
19 November 1900	Aston Villa	1–1	West Bromwich Albion	The Hawthorns	10,000	
(R) 17 December 1900	Aston Villa	2–0	West Bromwich Albion	Villa Park	12,652	
18 November 1901	Aston Villa	1–0	West Bromwich Albion	Villa Park	10,600	
24 November 1902	Wolverhampton Wanderers	3–2	West Bromwich Albion	Villa Park	4,500	
23 November 1903	Aston Villa	4–2	Small Heath	Villa Park	6,000	
21 November 1904	Aston Villa	1–0 (Note: The match was abandoned after 50 minutes, with Aston Villa leading 1–0; the trophy was shared.)	Small Heath	Muntz Street	8,000	
20 November 1905	Aston Villa	4–3 (Note: Clives gives the score as 4-1.)	West Bromwich Albion	Muntz Street	12,000	
24 September 1906	Aston Villa	1–1	Birmingham	Muntz Street	7,000	
14 October 1907	Birmingham	4–0	Aston Villa	Villa Park	6,000	
21 September 1908	Birmingham	5–2	Aston Villa	St Andrew's	8,000	
20 September 1909	Aston Villa	2–	Birmingham	St Andrew's	5,000	
19 September 1910	Aston Villa	2–1	West Bromwich Albion	Villa Park	5,507	
18 September 1911	Aston Villa	4–0	West Bromwich Albion	Villa Park	6,503	
2 October 1912	Aston Villa	5–1	West Bromwich Albion	The Hawthorns	8,077	
22 October 1913	West Bromwich Albion	1–0	Aston Villa	Villa Park	6,000	
23 September 1914	West Bromwich Albion	3–2	Aston Villa	Villa Park	5,017	
8 May 1920	Birmingham	4–1	Aston Villa	Villa Park	20,000	
14 May 1921	Birmingham	2–2	West Bromwich Albion	Villa Park	8,067	
13 May 1922	West Bromwich Albion	2–0	Birmingham	Villa Park	7,500	
2 May 1923	Aston Villa	2–0	West Bromwich Albion	Villa Park	2,300	
10 May 1924	Aston Villa	3–3	Birmingham	Villa Park	8,000	
9 May 1925	West Bromwich Albion	3–1	Birmingham	St Andrew's	10,000	
1926	Not held due to the General Strike					
14 May 1927	Aston Villa	4-2	Birmingham	Villa Park		
12 May 1928	Aston Villa	3-2	Birmingham	Villa Park		
11 May 1929	Aston Villa	2-1	Birmingham	Villa Park	10,000	
10 May 1930	Aston Villa	5-1	Wolverhampton Wanderers	Villa Park	25,000	
9 May 1931	Aston Villa	3–2	West Bromwich Albion	The Hawthorns	18,189	
14 May 1932	Aston Villa	2-1	Wolverhampton Wanderers	Villa Park	5,000	
13 May 1933	Aston Villa	4–0	West Bromwich Albion	The Hawthorns	8,500	
12 May 1934	Birmingham	2–0	Aston Villa	St Andrew's	7,000	
6 May 1935	Birmingham	2–1	Aston Villa	St Andrew's		
9 May 1936	Birmingham	4–2	Aston Villa	Villa Park	10,000	
8 May 1937	Aston Villa	2–2	Birmingham	Villa Park	2,000	
1938	Birmingham	1–1	Coventry City			
13 May 1939	Aston Villa	1–0	Coventry City	Villa Park	5,000	
(1st Leg) 24 October 1961	Aston Villa Youth	3-1	Birmingham City Youth	St Andrew's		
(2nd Leg) 7 May 1962	Birmingham City Youth	3-1 (4-4 Aggregate)	Aston Villa Youth	Villa Park		
(1st Leg) 15 April 1964	Birmingham City Youth	3-3	Aston Villa Youth	St Andrew's		
(2nd Leg) 20 April 1964	Aston Villa Youth	1-1 (4-4 Aggregate)	Birmingham City Youth	Villa Park		
