= George Timmins (footballer) =

English footballer

Personal information
- Date of birth: Quarter 1 1864
- Place of birth: West Bromwich, England
- Position: Left-half

Senior career*
| Years | Team | Apps | (Gls) |
| 1880 – 1891 | West Bromwich Albion | 36 | (0) |
| 1891 | Old Hill Wanderers | | |
- * Club domestic league appearances and goals

George Timmins was an English footballer who played at left-half. George Timmins signed for West Bromwich Albion in 1880, turning professional in August 1885. From August 1885 through to April 1888, the last three seasons before the Football League commenced George Timmins was part of three FA Cup Final teams 1885 – 1888. He obtained a Winner's medal in 1888 when the Albion defeated Preston North End 2–1 in the Final.

George Timmins made his League debut on 8 September 1888, at wing-half for West Bromwich Albion in a 2–0 win against Stoke at the Victoria Ground, Stoke. He played all of the "Throstles" 22 Football League matches in season 1888–89 and was part of a midfield that achieved a big (three goals or more) League win on two separate occasions.

A skilful and determined footballer, he was known as a hard, fearless man, who made it challenging for opponents in the tackle.
