= Walsall Swifts F.C. =

- Full name: Walsall Swifts Football Club
- Nickname: Swifts
- Founded: 1874
- Dissolved: 1888
- Ground: the Chuckery
- Chairman: Alderman Evans
- Secretary: W. Kendrick
Home colours

Walsall Swifts F.C. was an association football club from Walsall, then in Staffordshire, which merged with Walsall Town in 1888 to form the club which would become Walsall F.C.

== History ==
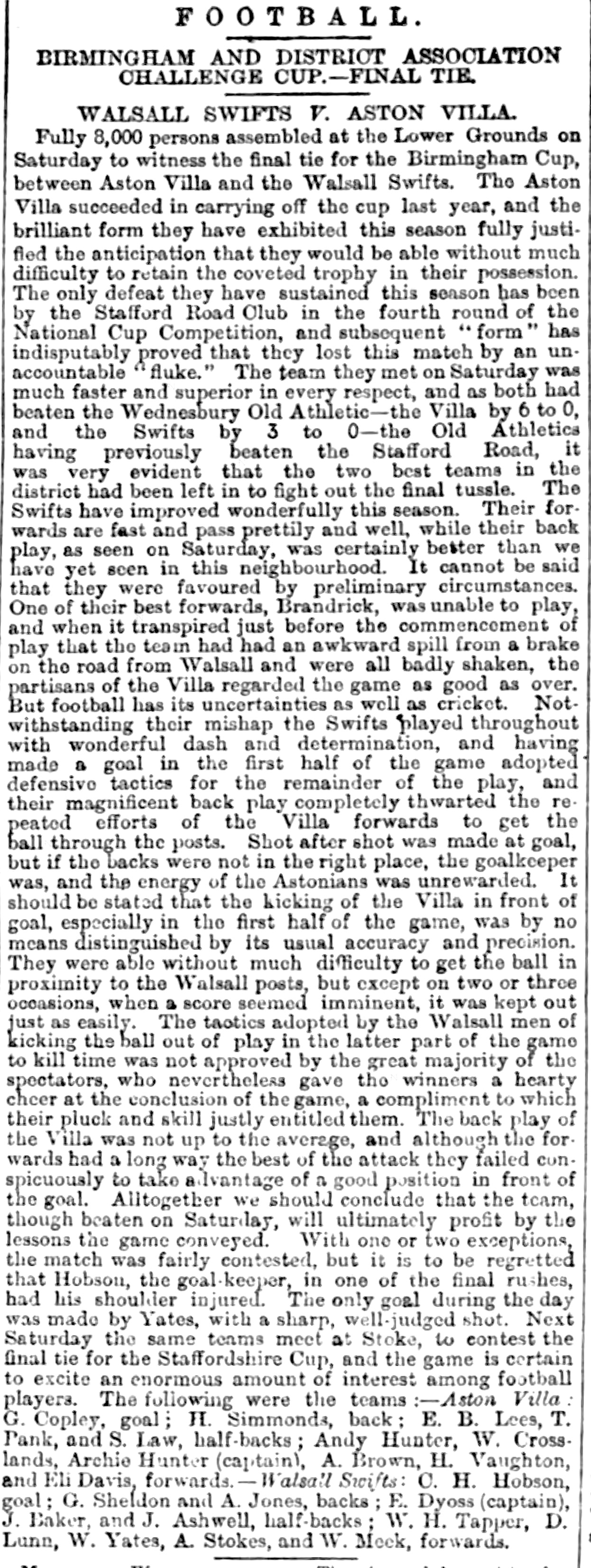
1880–81 Birmingham Senior Cup Final, Walsall Swifts 1–0 Aston Villa, Birmingham Evening Mail, 11 April 1881

The club was formed in 1874 as Victoria Swifts, and under that name it entered the 1876–77 Birmingham Senior Cup, the first instalment of the competition; it lost 2–1 at Wednesbury Town in the first round. By 1877 the club was being called Walsall Victoria Swifts and by the end of 1878 more simply Walsall Swifts. The club was made up of workers in the town, in particular in the leather industry, and, unlike Walsall Town, tended to have full fixture lists to generate the income from football that its players lacked in work.

On Whit Monday May 1880, Aston Villa Football Club arranged a six-a-side football competition at their Wellington Road ground. Other club entries included Walsall Swifts, Wednesbury Old Athletic, Blackburn Rovers, Darwen, Elwell's, and Notts Forest.

=== Birmingham Senior Cup success and Staffordshire Cup failures ===
Walsall Swifts F.C. reached the 1879-80 Birmingham Senior Cup semi-final, by which time the Swifts were seen as the strongest side in Walsall. The semi-final stage (because of an inequality of entrants) had three teams, but Swifts was doubly unlucky with the draw - it missed out on the bye to the final, and was drawn to face Aston Villa, by then the strongest side in the Midlands. Villa duly won 2–1, in front of 6,000 at the Aston Lower Grounds, after scoring twice in two minutes.

The club gained a perfect revenge in 1880–81 , with a surprise 1–0 win over the Villans in the Birmingham Senior Cup final, to gain the club's greatest success. The following week, the sides met again in the final of the Staffordshire Senior Cup at Stoke, the Swifts having beaten Walsall Town in the first round. This time Villa took the trophy, with Swifts handicapped by having to play a reserve goalkeeper, as Hobson had had his collarbone broken by the Villa forwards in the Senior Cup final. Despite playing in three Staffordshire Cup finals, Swifts never took the trophy, losing to Town in 1881–82 and West Bromwich Albion in 1886–87.

=== Walsall Cup ===
It was however initially dominant in the Walsall Cup, winning every instalment from the first in 1878–79 to 1883–84, except for 1882–83, when the club lost 3–2 to Wednesbury Old Athletic at the Wednesbury Oval in the semi-final, in a frantic final ten minutes which saw the Swifts go from 1–0 down to 2–1 up, but lose to a very late goal; W.O.A.C. lost to Small Heath Alliance in the final. However, the Swifts' dominance was helped by Walsall Town eschewing the competition until 1883. The Swifts were awarded the first trophy in perpetuity in 1881, after its third consecutive victory. Once Town started to enter, however, Swifts never again took the trophy. The two clubs met in the 1885–86 final, and the Swifts protested Town's victory on the basis of spectator encroachment. Initially succeeding in its appeal, Town had the motion overturned, on the basis that the Swifts "packed" the vote with representatives who were not otherwise entitled to appear.

=== FA Cup ===
It entered the FA Cup for the first time in 1882–83, at the same time as its neighbour club, but was unlucky again to be drawn to face Aston Villa away from home in the first round, going down 4–1; the club had tried an unusual 1–1–3–5 formation with George Sheldon playing as "three quarter back", but to no avail. Its best run in the competition came in 1884–85, when three wins put it in the last 18. The club's third round tie with Mitchells St George's at the latter's Fentham Road ground ended in acrimony; the Swifts came from 2–0 down to go 3–2 up, but the Dragons protested the third goal on the basis that the ball had not crossed the line. St George's left the pitch and protested to the FA, which dismissed the protest. At the fourth round stage, Swifts went down 4–1 to Notts County - the loss of captain Alf Jones through illness was "keenly felt". It missed out on entering the 1886–87 FA Cup as its entry was received late, alongside those of a dozen other unfortunate clubs.

=== Professionalism ===
In 1885, with professionalism running rampant in English football, Swifts were one of only three clubs outside Lancashire - the others being Villa and Sunderland - which proposed to join a new, professional, British Football Association. Before the club members could ratify subscription, the Football Association permitted professionals to play in tournaments, and the BFA was no longer required; possibly at the instigation of Town, the Walsall & District FA passed a motion of censure against the Swifts. However, the increased professionalism meant that the Swifts lacked the resources to compete with better-endowed clubs, and in the first round of the 1885–86 FA Cup, three ex-Swifts players were found in the Aston Villa XI which faced Walsall Town.

=== Merger ===
The first round of the 1887–88 FA Cup saw both Walsall clubs eliminated at the first hurdle, and, given the choice of matches (as both Town and Swifts were playing on neighbouring pitches at the Chuckery), spectators had definitely chosen Swifts over Town; nearly 5,000 watched Swifts lose to Wolverhampton Wanderers, but under a thousand saw Town go down to Birmingham St George's. However, both clubs were in financial difficulties; Swifts because of a fall-off in support, Town because the previous club secretary had absconded with the club books. On 22 February 1888, the clubs agreed to merge under the name Walsall Town Swifts and the new Town-Swifts took its bow on 9 April 1888 in a 0–0 draw in the Birmingham Charity Cup against Aston Villa. The Swifts however still had one more outstanding engagement, namely the final of the Walsall Cup, in which it was due to face West Bromwich Albion. The match took place on 28 April 1888, at the Chuckery, the visitors winning 4–1.

== Colours ==
The club's original colours were amber and black, which it changed in 1879 to maroon. It retained maroon jerseys until the merger, other than in 1882–83 when the club wore red, white, and blue hooped jerseys.

== Ground ==
The club originally played on West Bromwich Road, using the Windmill Tavern as facilities. In 1877 the club moved to a ground at Folly House Lane, in "Little London" (Caldmore), and in 1881 it moved to the Chuckery, on a pitch laid out next to the Walsall Town pitch.

== Notable players ==
- Notable players ( 7 )

One Swifts player was capped for the England national football team; full-back Alf Jones, who played twice for England in 1882 before leaving for the professional Great Lever side, unfortunately scoring an own goal in the second match.

Full-back Albert Aldridge, who played for Swifts in the early 1880s, was capped when playing for West Bromwich Albion, and again after he returned to play for Walsall Town Swifts.

== Honours ==
- FA Cup
  - Best performance: 4th round, 1884–85
- Birmingham Senior Cup
  - Winner: 1880–81
- Staffordshire Cup
  - Runner-up: 1880–81, 1881–82, 1886–87
- Walsall Cup
  - Winner: 1878–79, 1879–80, 1880–81, 1881–82, 1883–84
  - Runner-up: 1885–86, 1887–88
