= Salter Housewares =

British housewares brand

Salter is a British housewares brand. Established in 1760, Salter has been developing precision products for over 260 years. Salter develops and sells products that span a wide range of core product categories, including scales, electricals, cookware and countertop. It is a market leader in kitchen and bathroom scales and one of the UK’s oldest consumer brands. It was acquired by Manchester-based consumer goods giant Ultimate Products in 2021, after they had previously licensed the brand for cookware and kitchen electrical goods since 2011.

== History ==
The firm began life in the late 1760s in the village of Bilston, England when Richard Salter, a spring maker, began making the first spring scales in Britain. He called these scales "pocket steelyards", though they work on a different principle from steelyard balances.

By 1825 his nephew George had taken over the company, which became known as George Salter & Co. George later established a manufacturing site in the town of West Bromwich, about 4 miles (7 km) from Bilston. West Bromwich Albion football club was formed from workers at this works site. From here the company produced a wide variety of scales including the UK's first bathroom scales. Other items were added to the range, including irons, mincers, potato chippers, coin-operated machines and the first typewriters made in the UK.

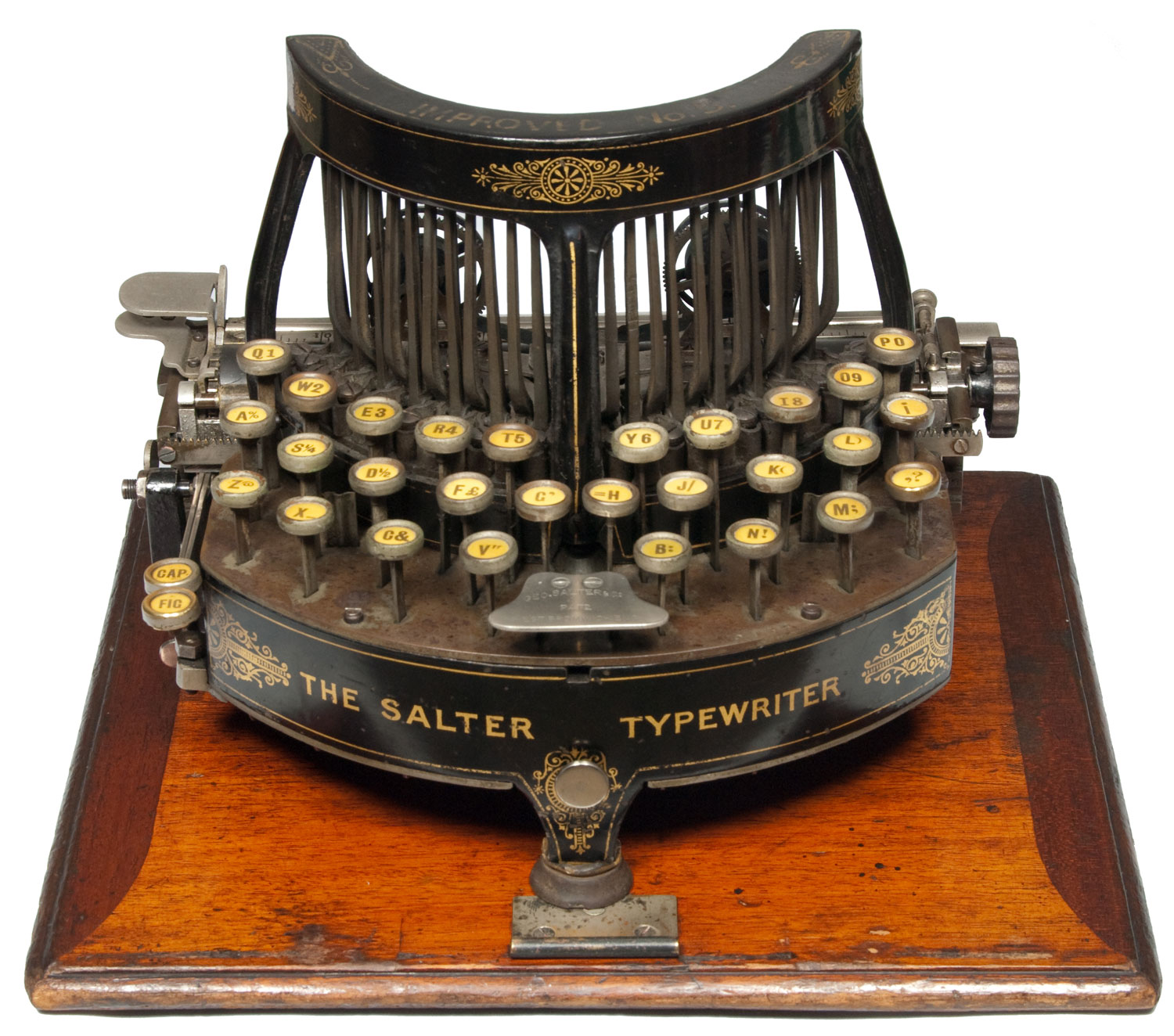
Salter 5 typewriter, 1892

The business thrived throughout the 1900s, and by 1950 it employed over 2000 people, still in the same area and owned by the same family.

== Late 20th century to present ==
In 1972 the company was purchased by Staveley Industries Plc and was split into separate subsidiaries: housewares, industrial, etc., relocating as required.

In the late 1980s and early 1990s Staveley acquired more businesses worldwide to form a new "weighing group", including the Weigh-Tronix company of America, and in 1998 after a management buyout (MBO), this became the Weigh-Tronix Corporation, with Salter Housewares a part of that. The focus of the new corporation was increasingly towards industrial or commercial weighing, and in February 2002 the management team at Salter Housewares Ltd. bought the company out from the group to concentrate on its consumer businesses. The MBO was backed by Barclays Private Equity to the sum of £18 million (€28m).

The company grew rapidly for the next two years, and in March 2004 it was sold to HoMedics, a US-based manufacturer of "personal wellness" products, generating an internal rate of return (IRR) of approximately 70% for Barclays Private Equity. In 2006, Salter Housewares USA and Taylor Precision Products Inc. (also owned by HoMedics) merged their sales, marketing and distribution operations.

The company has since closed its historic factory in West Bromwich, England and shifted manufacture to China. The site has been sold for redevelopment.

Salter began a partnership with chef Heston Blumenthal in 2010. Salter’s design team work alongside Blumenthal’s team from the Fat Duck kitchens to develop a range of precision weighing instruments.

In 2011, Greater Manchester based consumer goods giant Ultimate Products Global Sourcing licensed the Salter Brand to sell electrical cookware, bakeware, food prep and small domestic appliances.

Ultimate Products announced the £34m acquisition of the Salter brand in July 2021.

== See also ==
- Avery Weigh-Tronix
- Phil Drabble - a former director
