= Jack Whitehouse =

English footballer

Personal information
- Full name: James William Whitehouse
- Date of birth: 12 August 1861
- Place of birth: West Bromwich, England
- Date of death: June 1933 (aged 71)
- Place of death: Batley, England
- Position: Outside right

Senior career*
Years	Team	Apps	(Gls)
1880–1884	West Bromwich Albion	0 (Note: Whitehouse's playing career pre-dated league football.)	(0)
- * Club domestic league appearances and goals

James William "Jack" Whitehouse (12 August 1861 – June 1933) was an English footballer who played at outside right. He was born in West Bromwich and played for Holy Trinity F.C. and West Bromwich Rovers, before joining West Bromwich Albion in August 1880. He retired in May 1884.
