= Harry Aston (footballer, born 1855) =

English footballer

Personal information
- Full name: Harold Mason Aston
- Date of birth: 10 October 1855
- Place of birth: Bloxwich, England
- Date of death: 1914 (aged 58–59)
- Place of death: West Bromwich, England
- Position: Forward

Senior career*
Years	Team	Apps	(Gls)
1879–1885	West Bromwich Albion	0	(0)
1885–1886	Wolverhampton Wanderers	0	(0)
1886–1887	Burslem Port Vale	0	(0)
	Preston North End	0	(0)
1889–1891	Oldbury Town		
Total		0+	(0+)
- * Club domestic league appearances and goals

Harold Mason Aston (10 October 1855 – 1914) was an English footballer who scored the first recorded goal of West Bromwich Albion.

== Career ==
After leaving Spon Lane School, Aston worked at the George Salter Spring Works. He joined West Bromwich Albion in September 1879 and was a member of the club's first senior squad of 1879–80. He netted Albion's first recorded goal on 20 December 1879, in a friendly against Black Lake Victoria. He also played in Albion's first FA Cup match against Wednesbury Town in November 1883.

Aston moved to Albion's Black Country rivals Wolverhampton Wanderers in July 1885, where he remained for a year. During his time with Wolves, he appeared in five FA Cup games, scoring four times, as the club made the fourth round for the first time.

He moved to Burslem Port Vale in the summer of 1886 and quickly established himself as a first-team competitor. He scored 16 goals in 44 games, though most of these were friendlies he did make four FA Cup appearances. He departed in 1887 to spend a brief period with First Division side Preston North End. He ended his playing career with two seasons at Oldbury Town. Aston became a labourer after he retired from football in May 1891. He died in 1914 in West Bromwich.
