= Aston Lower Grounds =

Park and sports venue in Aston, Birmingham

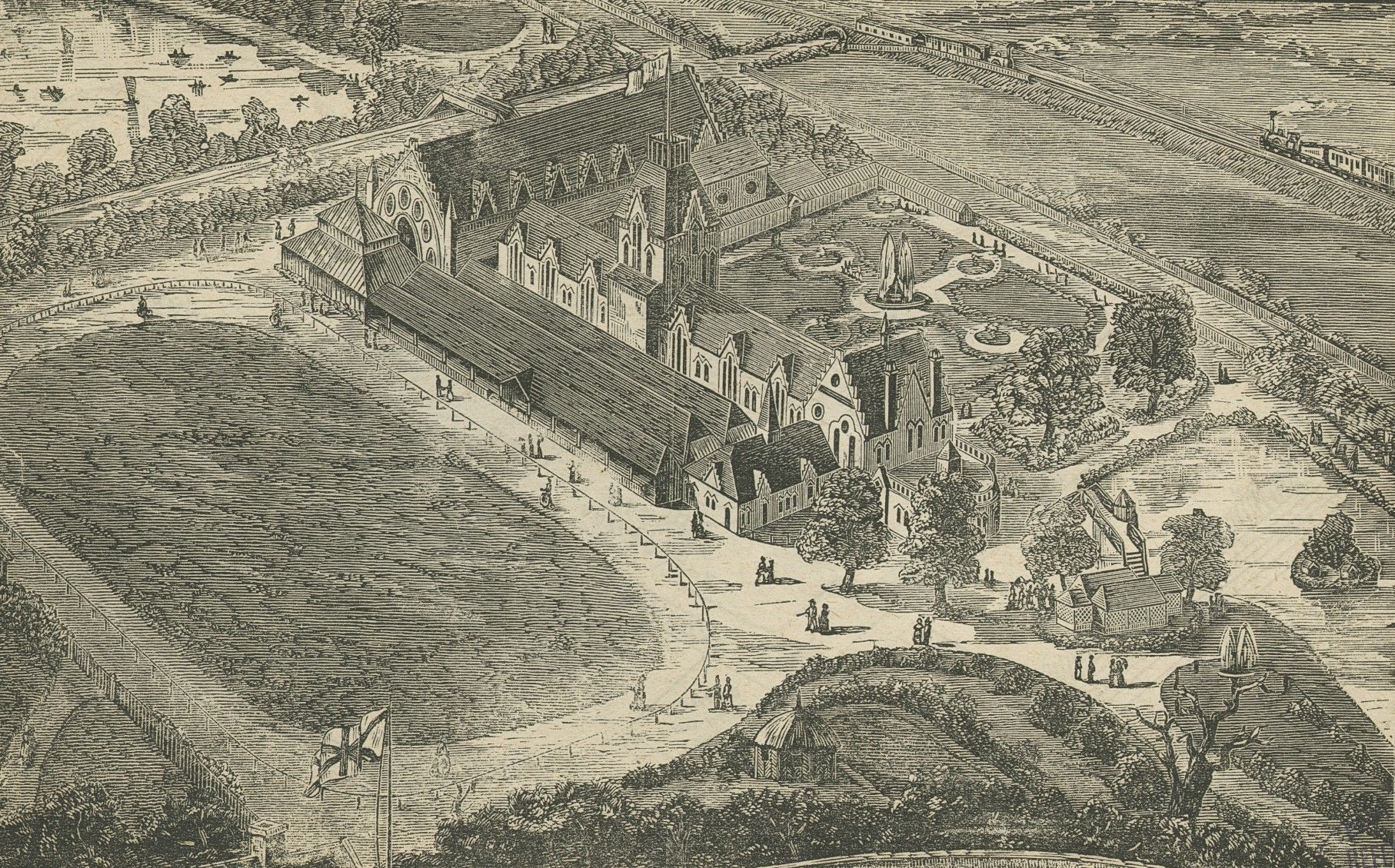
- Illustration from Hammond's Illustrated Guide (Birmingham), published 1882. Note Staffordshire Pool, top left, reached by a footbridge from the main grounds.
- Interactive map of Aston Lower Grounds
- Former names: Lower Grounds at Aston Park
- Location: Witton Lane, Birmingham, England
- Coordinates: 52.510430°N 1.886391°W

Construction
- Built: 1858; 168 years ago
- Opened: 1858
- Closed: 1897; 129 years ago

Tenant
- Birmingham Cricket & Football Club

The Aston Lower Grounds was a pleasure ground area in Aston, (since 1911, part of Birmingham), Warwickshire, England. It was open to the public in the late Victorian era. The facility included a lake, which lay across the boundary of the adjacent county, Staffordshire.

The site is now substantially occupied by the Aston Villa stadium, Villa Park.

== History ==
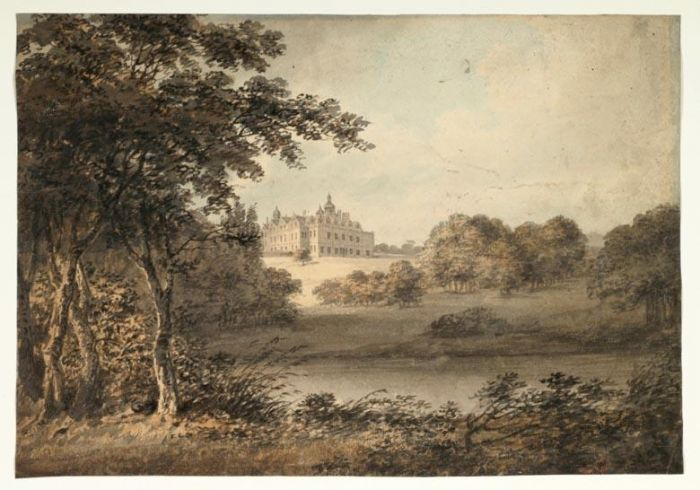
View of Aston Hall from the Staffordshire Pool (circa 1808–1838) by Vincent Barber, looking across the Lower Grounds.

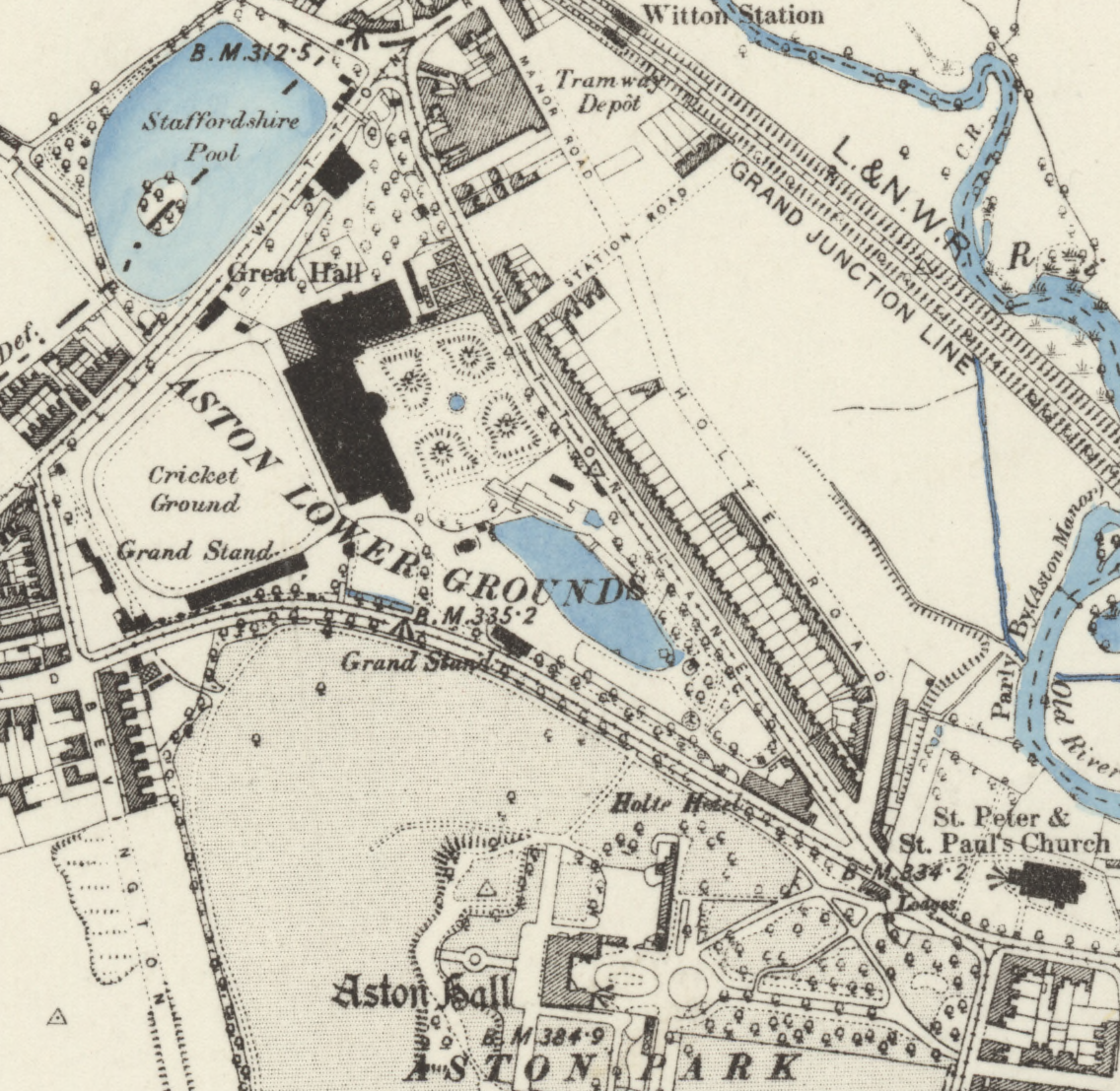
Aston Lower Grounds and Aston Hall, circa 1887. Villa Park was built mostly over the pond at the south end of the Grounds

The Lower Grounds were originally the kitchen, private gardens, and fish-ponds belonging to Aston Hall. The Grounds, under the name of Aston Park, were opened to the public by Queen Victoria on 16 June 1858, (Note: Vauxhall Gardens, an earlier pleasure garden nearby, had closed in the early 1850s) marking her first visit to Birmingham.

J. A. Langford was put in charge of the Aston Hall and Park Company, but the Park suffered from a number of disasters. In 1861, a group of "roughs" rioted when refused admission to a performance by Charles Blondin, and in July 1863, during a charity fête in the Park, Selina Powell, a tightrope walker who performed under the name of "Madame Geneive, the Female Blondin", fell to her death. The company was duly liquidated in 1864.

The clerk of works, Henry Quilter, had already arranged to take over 31 acres of the park area, in the Lower Grounds directly to the north of Aston Park, which soon became the name by which the area was known; the first season tickets for entry to all facilities (including boating and quoit clubs) were 10/6, and 5/- for the grounds only.

Quilter improved the Grounds by preparing two lakes for boating (one of which lay in the adjacent county of Staffordshire, from which it took its name), and adding a roller-skating rink in 1875; he also adapted the cricket pitch for football over the winter from 1874, with a football club made up of the workers on the grounds, Birmingham F.C., being set up. However, Quilter too ran out of money, and in 1878 he sold his interest to the Aston Lower Grounds Company, which made Quilter managing director, for £45,000 in cash and shares, although £35,000 was owed on a mortgage to the previous freehold owner.

Witton station opened adjacent to the grounds, on the London and North Western's Grand Junction Railway line, in 1876.

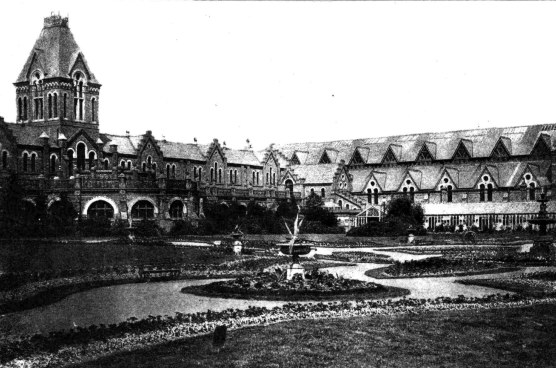
Aston Lower Grounds in 1888

In 1879, an aquarium was set up, in a 312' long building. The aquarium was not a success, and a menagerie replaced it in 1886, which included an aviary, a monkey house, tigers, lions, a leopard, Russian bears, elephants, and kangaroos. The Buffalo Bill Wild West show also played at the Lower Grounds in September 1891.

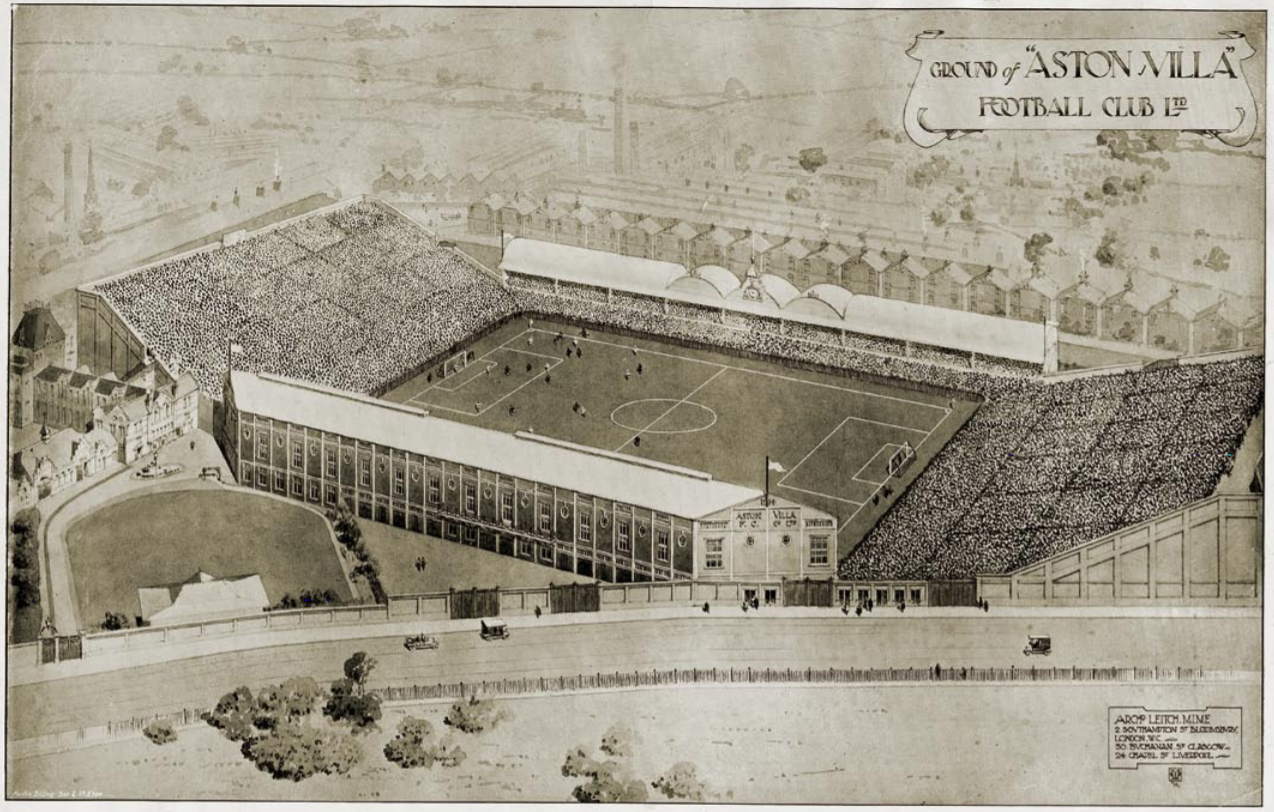
Proposed extension to Villa Park published in 1914, using an image with the Lower Ground's Great Hall and bowling green visible on the left-hand edge

In October 1895, Aston Villa F.C. decided to leave its Wellington Road ground and move to the Lower Grounds; the club resolved to spend £14,000 on upgrading the facilities for football, including replacing the cinder cycling track with a concrete one. Some of the Pleasure Grounds buildings remained, but most of the facilities were subsumed into the building of Villa Park, and in 1911 Villa bought the entire site, closing it off to the general public. The club demolished the buildings in 1912.

== Cricket ==
The Park held cricket matches from at least 1861, when the North met the South on what was called the "New Ground".

The most prestigious cricket match the ground held was between the Australians and an England XI, featuring five Lancashire professionals, on 26 May 1884; the match was scheduled for 3 days, but was over in 1, the swift conclusion being blamed on a grassless and muddy pitch. Australia won by 4 wickets, with 217 runs being scored in the entire match.

By 1889 however the ground had been sold for housing, with Jardine Road, Endicott Road, and Nelson Road being built over the pitch, and sporting events moved to the drained fish-pond/ornamental lake area, which did not have enough room for a full cricket field.

== Football ==
The football ground – on the cricket pitch – was considered the most prestigious in the Midlands, hosting the Birmingham Senior Cup finals until 1895, many of the Birmingham Junior Cup finals, and representative matches involving the Birmingham Football Association. It even hosted a floodlit match between C. H. Quilter's Birmingham club and Nottingham Forest in 1878. In 1891 it became the home ground of Aston Victoria F.C., one of the leading non-league clubs in the district, although the club wound up after a season's tenancy.

The last competitive match it hosted was the Birmingham Junior Cup final between Rudge Whitworth and Warwick United on 10 April 1897, Rudge winning 3–0. The Villa Park name was adopted for the replacement ground in September 1897, but many continued to refer to the venue as the Aston Lower Grounds, considering the new name as being "a senseless and an empty suggestion" and "loud, coarse, nauseous, and disgusting, and brought from the lowest depths of vulgarity and caddishness".

== Cycling ==
Cycling events had been held in the Upper Park in 1870, and by 1875 the Lower Grounds was hosting such events; A 501-yard cinder cycling track was also installed in 1879, around the cricket pitch. When Birchfield Harriers held their first annual athletics meeting here in June 1879, Aston Villa player, Tommy Pank placed first in the final heat of the one-mile bicycle handicap.

The track held the National Cycling Union championships between 1882 and 1887. The sale of the cricket ground required a new track - a quarter of a mile around, with banked corners - to be set up in 1889, on the site of the ornamental lake. A new concrete banked track was built when Aston Villa bought the Lower Grounds.

== Athletics ==
In June 1879, Birchfield Harriers held their first annual athletics meeting at the Aston Lower Grounds, attended by 4,000 despite the unfavourable weather. Under captain George Ramsay, the six man Aston Villa Football Club lost to West Bromwich Gymnastics Club in the tug of war competition.
