= Wednesbury Old Athletic F.C. =

English football club based in Wednesbury, West Midlands

Wednesbury Old Athletic
- Full name: Wednesbury Old Athletic Football Club
- Nickname: Old 'Uns
- Founded: 1874
- Dissolved: 1893
- Ground: The Oval, Wednesbury
Home colours

Wednesbury Old Athletic, often referred to as W.O.A.C., was an English association football club based in Wednesbury, West Midlands (Staffordshire at the time). There were three clubs that had this name.

== Original club ==
The programme for the 1883 Birmingham Senior Cup final between the "Old Uns" and Aston Villa

The first began life as the Wednesbury Literary & Athletic Institute in October 1874, adopting the more familiar title of Wednesbury Old Athletic Club (WOAC for short) the following year. WOAC became a founder member of the Birmingham & District Football Association in December 1875 and won the inaugural Birmingham Senior Cup competition, defeating Stafford Road 3–2 in the 1877 Final, at the Calthorpe F.C. ground, in front of between two and three thousand spectators. This success was repeated two years later, and in 1880, having joined the Staffordshire Football Association, the Old Athletic won the Staffs Cup, beating Aston Villa 2–1 in the Final.

On Whit Monday May 1880, Aston Villa Football Club arranged a six-a-side football competition at their Wellington Road ground. Other club entries included WOAC, Blackburn Rovers, Darwen, Walsall Swifts, Elwell's, and Notts Forest.

The club played in the FA Cup of 1881–82 and reached the quarter-finals, beating Aston Villa by four goals to two on the way. But they lost 13–0 to Villa in the Cup on 30 October 1886 (still Villa's biggest ever win) and would later be knocked out of the competition by Blackburn Rovers. The Old Uns played in the tournament in every season up to its eventual demise in 1893, but never matched the performance of that first season, and failed to progress beyond the qualifying rounds after 1888.

Wednesbury Old Athletic played in the Birmingham & District League from 1890 to 1891, and reached the Birmingham Senior Cup final in 1891 (beating Stoke in the semi-final), before joining the Midland League for the following two seasons. After narrowly missing out on the Midland League championship in 1892 the club's fortunes declined. Wednesbury was too small a town to support a professional club, given the proximity of Birmingham and Walsall, and their final match in the Birmingham Senior Cup was a 5–0 defeat to Small Heath in 1892–93. In July 1893, the Old Athletic disbanded.

== Successor clubs ==
A second club was formed from the ashes of the first, but its career was to be brief. Unable to obtain the use of a regular home ground, the club withdrew from the Walsall Junior League halfway through the season and subsequently folded.

A third club began life as Wednesbury Excelsior in around 1891. It existed in local football, playing cup ties and friendlies, before joining the West Midlands Amateur League in 1896. Finishing as runners-up at the first attempt, the club joined the Walsall & District League in 1897 and adopted the title of Wednesbury Old Athletic. WOAC spent 10 seasons in this league, winning the title in 1900 and 1905, and the Staffordshire Junior Cup three times in six seasons, as well as various other local cup competitions. In 1907 Wednesbury Old Athletic joined the Birmingham Combination, spending three seasons there before joining the professional Birmingham & District League. Here, the club pitted itself against future Football League clubs Crewe Alexandra, Kidderminster Harriers, Shrewsbury Town, Stoke City, Walsall and Wrexham, in addition to the reserve sides of Aston Villa, Birmingham City, Coventry City, West Bromwich Albion and Wolverhampton Wanderers. The Old Uns never finished higher than 12th out of 18th in this league, and left the competition in 1924 following its sixth consecutive application for re-election. The club dropped back down to the Birmingham Combination, but after collecting just a single point from 12 fixtures the Old Athletic withdrew from the competition and disbanded.

== Colours ==
The club's colours changed from scarlet and black to blue and white.

Year	Colours
1877–78	Scarlet and black jersey, white shorts
1879–80	White jersey, blue shorts, scarlet and black stockings & cap
1881	Scarlet
1882	Scarlet and blue
1883–84	not recorded
1885–86	Red and blue
1887–88	White and blue
1889–90	White shirts and blue shorts

== FA Cup record ==
=== Results ===
Season	Date	Round	Venue	Opposition	Result	Score
1881–82	5 November 1881	First round	H	Mitchell St George's	W	9–0
	3 December 1881	Second round	H	Small Heath Alliance	W	6–0
Wednesbury Old Athletic awarded a "Bye" in the third round
	21 January 1882	Fourth round	H	Aston Villa	W	4–2
	11 February 1882	Fifth round	A	Blackburn Rovers	L	1–3
1882–83	4 November 1882	First round	A	Chesterfield Spital	W	7–1
	18 November 1882	Second round	A	Aston Villa	L	1–4
1883–84	10 November 1883	First round	H	Mitchell St George's	W	5–0
	1 December 1883	Second round	H	Wolverhampton Wanderers	W	4–2
	29 December 1883	Third round	H	Aston Villa	L	4–7
1884–85	8 November 1884	First round	A	Derby Midland	W	2–1
	6 December 1884	Second round	A	West Bromwich Albion	L	2–4
1885–86	31 October 1885	First round	H	Burton Swifts	W	5–1
	21 November 1885	Second round	A	West Bromwich Albion	L	2–3
1886–87	30 October 1886	First round	A	Aston Villa	L	0–13
1887–88	15 October 1887	First round	A	West Bromwich Albion	L	1–7

=== Statistics ===
Played	Wins	Draws	Losses	"Byes"	Goals For	Goals Against	Goal Difference	Most Successful Campaign	Most Played Opposition	Biggest Win	Biggest Defeat
15	8	0	7	1	53	48	+5	1881–82 (Fifth round)	Aston Villa (4 times)	9–0 (vs. Mitchell St George's, 1881–82)	0–13 (vs. Aston Villa, 1886–87)

== Home ground ==
The original club initially played at the Well's Field, through which Rooth Street now runs, opposite the Horse & Jockey public house. It later played at the Athletic Ground, on the upper side of Wood Green Cemetery, a site which forms part of Brunswick Park.

Its best known home ground is often listed as the Oval on St Paul's Road, Wood Green, but colloquially referred to as Elwell's Ground after a factory of the same name in the nearby area. It was also nearby Bescot Junction (Junction 9 of the M6 in modern terms) and Wood Green railway station. This is close to the site of present-day Wood Green High School, where a playing field known affectionately as "Elwell's" existed until recently. (The site has been redeveloped in recent times and now forms part of Wood Green High School). The name "Elwell" refers to Edward Elwell, who owned a large forge in Wednesbury that was previously situated at Wood Green. The Oval was not hospitable, described as "one of the bleakest spots...it is very exposed, and the wind used to blow across that large pool and sweep over the ground".

The later club played at several different grounds, including 'The Press Ground' in Wood Green (1894 to 1896), The Oval (1896 to 1898), The Central Grounds on Lloyd Street (1898 to 1910) and The Leabrook Grounds (known as The Boat) on Leabrook Road (1910 to 1924).

== Related media ==
- Carr, Steve (2010). The Old Uns Revisited – Wednesbury Old Athletic 1893 to 1924. Spellbound. ISBN 978-0-9565030-1-5.

A matchday report from 1883 depicting a game between Wednesbury Old Athletic and Aston Villa is featured in The Aston Villa Chronicles.
