= Aston Villa F.C. in the 1880s =

English football club history

The 1880s was a decade that saw Aston Villa F.C. go from a small club to one that could challenge most teams in the country at the time. It also saw their most significant contribution to the game across the globe, with William McGregor creating the world's first Football League.

== 1879–80 ==
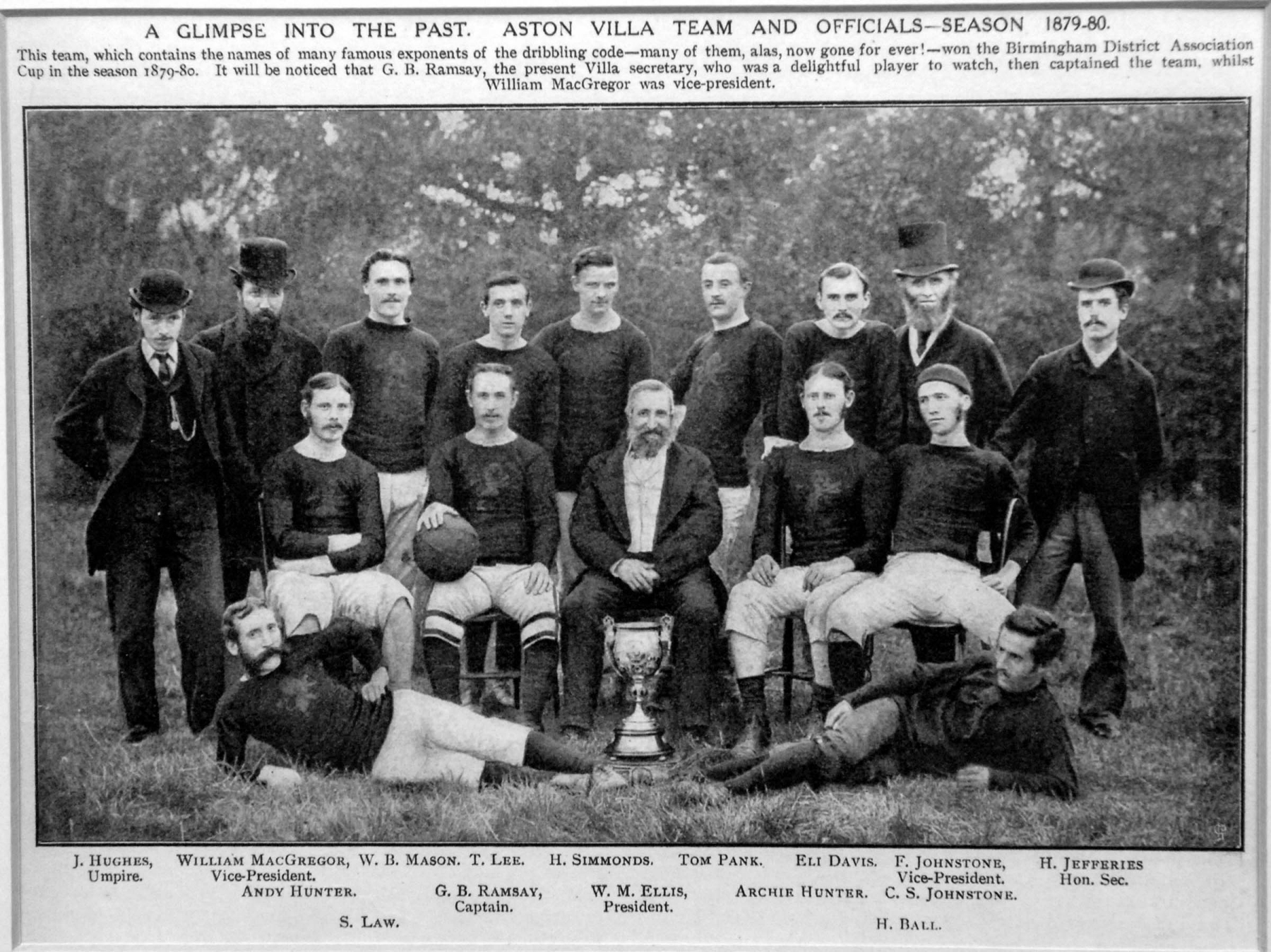

The 1879–80 English football season saw Villa's entry into top flight competitive association football with their first ever FA Cup tie. Villa's first attempt to win the FA Cup came in the same year, but ended in controversy and confusion. Having defeated Stafford Road 3–2 in the first round replay, Villa were drawn to play the then-successful Oxford University in the second round. Perhaps feeling that it was a waste of time spending good money on travel expenses for a match they felt they would lose, the Villa board took the decision to 'scratch' (forfeit) the game.

In 1880, nine years before the creation of the Football League, Villa collected their first ever piece of silverware, the Birmingham Senior Cup. They defeated Saltley College 3–2 in the final with goals from Eli Davis, William Mason and George Ramsay in front of 6,000 at Aston Lower Grounds (modern-day Villa Park).

The first "Second City derby" occurred on 27 September 1879, when Villa played Small Heath Alliance. The game, on a pitch at Small Heath's Muntz Street ground described by the Villa players as "only suitable for pot-holing", finished 1–0 – recorded as "one goal and a disputed goal to nil" – to the home side.

There were debuts for John Ball (2), William Crossland, Andy Hunter, George Ramsay, Harry Simmonds, Tommy Pank, Sammy Law, Ted Lee, Eli Davis, Billy Mason, Archie Hunter and Charlie Johnstone.

=== FA Cup details ===
- 1st Round v Stafford Road (A) 1–1
- (Replay) v Stafford Road (H) 3–2
- 2nd Round v Oxford University (A) — (Villa 'scratched')

== 1880–81 ==
In 1881 Villa departed the FA Cup at the 4th-round stage. Their first ever official defeat coming against the same team against whom they had achieved their first victory in the competition, Stafford Road. They also defeated Hearts 4–1 in a "glamour" friendly at Wellington Road.

There were debuts for George Copley, Bill Watts, Howard Vaughton and Arthur Brown.

=== FA Cup details ===
- 1st Round v Wednesbury Strollers (H) 5–3
- 2nd Round v Nottingham Forest (A) 2–1
- 3rd Round v Notts County (A) 3–1
- 4th Round v Stafford Road (H) 2–3

== 1881–82 ==
This year saw several Club records being set. Howard Vaughton and Albert Brown became the first Villa players to gain international caps. They represented England against Ireland at Belfast. It was not a bad start for the 'Perry Barr Pets' either as Brown scored four, while Vaughton scored five in a 13–0 victory.

Vaughton was a dangerous inside-left for Villa throughout the decade, picking up a Cup Winner's medal before his retirement through injury in 1888. He also owned a silversmith's which still exists today in Birmingham's Jewellery Quarter, and was commissioned to make a new FA Cup trophy when the original was stolen while in holders Villa's care in 1895. No England player has ever bettered his record of five goals in one international.

It also saw a significant friendly defeat against the famous Queen's Park club of Glasgow. While Villa were beaten 4–1, they learned from the Scottish club's innovative passing style. It was about this year that Villa began to wear what were described as 'maroon' shirts emblazoned with a large 'Lion Rampant' that now forms the central feature of the club's badge. The Lion Rampant was chosen by William McGregor as the club's emblem in tribute to his native Scotland, and also in recognition of the club's Scottish stars Ramsay and Archie Hunter. This was the first time the Villa kit had come to resemble anything like that worn by the team today. Throughout the 1870s they had worn a variety of kits, including all white, blue and black and all green.

In April 1882 Heart of Midlothian lost 2-6 at home to Aston Villa.

=== FA Cup ===
1882 also saw a creditable Cup performance as Villa dispatched Nottingham Forest and Notts County (after a replay) before succumbing to Wednesbury Old Athletic in the fourth round (Villa received a 'bye' in the second round).

- 1st Round v Nottingham Forest (H) 4–1
- 2nd Round – Villa received a 'bye'
- 3rd Round v Notts County (H) 2–2
- (Replay) v Notts County (A) 2-2
- (Replay) v Notts County (H) 4–1
- 4th Round v Wednesbury Old Athletic (A) 2–4

== 1882–83 ==
The programme for the 1883 Birmingham Senior Cup final between Wednesbury Old Athletic and Villa

1883 saw an increased takeover by professionals in the English game with Preston North End, in particular, attracting and paying a number of stars (mostly from Scotland). This move away from amateurism was to prove an advantage for Villa, whose industrial Birmingham home gave them access to large numbers of potential supporters. This in turn meant they could afford to pay decent wages to players with the ticket revenue accrued.

The year also saw Villa's longest run in the FA Cup. They beat Walsall Swifts, Wednesbury Old Athletic, Aston Unity and Walsall Town before a controversial 4–3 loss to Notts County. A County player appeared to punch the ball off the line in the dying stages, but the referee was unmoved. The beaten Walsall Swifts and Walsall Town would later merge to make the present-day Walsall FC.

There were debuts for Joe Simmonds (22), Thomas Bryan, David Anderson, Alf Harvey, Wally Roberts, Charles Apperley and Tommy Mason.

=== FA Cup details ===
- 1st Round v Walsall Swifts (H) 4–1
- 2nd Round v Wednesbury Old Athletic (H) 4–1
- 3rd Round v Aston Unity (H) 3–1
- 4th Round v Walsall Town (H) 2–1
- 5th Round v Notts County (A) 3–4

== 1883–84 ==
This season, after victories over Walsall Swifts, Stafford Road and Wednesbury Old Athletic (7–4), Villa were given their first FA Cup game that would mean having to travel outside the Midlands. They travelled to Glasgow to play Queen's Park. At the time, Scottish clubs regularly entered the 'English' FA Cup. After another large defeat 6–1, the Villa committee decided to change the playing style. At this time, before managers or coaches, committees picked the team. For the first time, Villa would now use two backs rather than one.

There were debuts for Archibald Vale, Tom Riddell and Robert Price.

=== FA Cup details ===
- 1st Round v Walsall Swifts (A) 1–0
- 2nd Round v Stafford Road (A) 5–1
- 3rd Round v Wednesbury Old Athletic (A) 7–4
- 4th Round v Queen's Park (A) 1–6

=== Birmingham Charity Cup ===
Aston Villa beat Albion 4–1 in the semi-final of the Birmingham Charity Cup. This was the first time that Albion had participated in this competition.

Round	Date	Opponent	Venue	Result	Goalscorers	Attendance
SF	5 April 1884	Aston Villa	A	1–4	Riddell (o.g.)	6,000

Source for match details:

== 1884–85 ==
The 1884–85 English football season saw Villa's first encounter with the West Bromwich Albion in the 1885 FA Cup. Villa lost 3–0 in their Third Round Replay.

There were debut appearances for Dick Robertson and Albert A Brown.

=== FA Cup details ===
- 1st Round v Wednesbury Town (A) 4–1
- 2nd Round v Walsall Town (A) 2–0
- 3rd Round v West Bromwich Albion (A) 0–0
- (Replay) v West Bromwich Albion (H) 0–3

== 1885–86 ==
This year saw Villa's most modest Cup performance since their first effort to win the trophy, in 1880. Villa were beaten in the second round by Derby County.

Denny Hodgetts signed for Villa in February 1886.

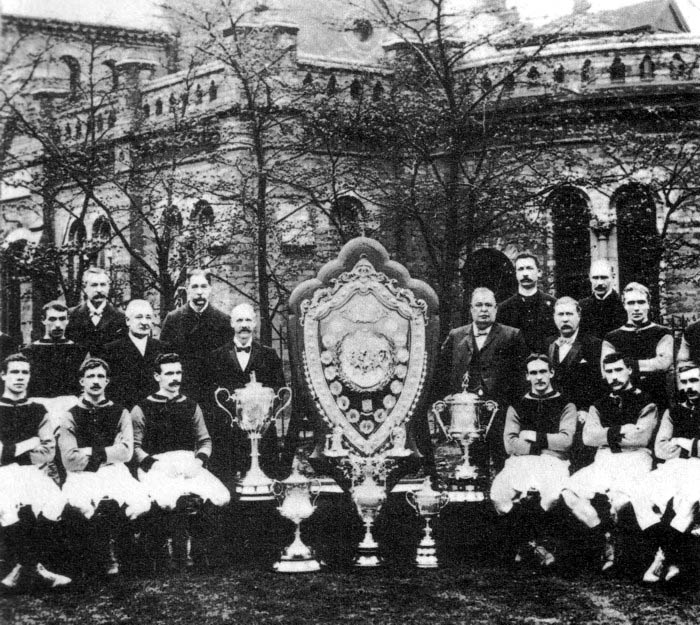
The hugely successful team Ramsay assembled at the end of the 19th century. Ramsay can be seen standing on the far left of the back row.

Following the professionalisation of football in 1885, the club decided that it needed a full-time paid manager. The following advert was placed in the Birmingham Daily Gazette newspaper in June 1886:

'Wanted: manager for Aston Villa Football Club, who will be required to devote his whole time under direction of the committee. Salary £100 per annum. Applications with reference must be made not later than June 23rd to Chairman of the Committee, Aston Villa Club House, 6 Witton Road, Aston’

Villa received 150 applicants for the role, but with his strong association with the club George Ramsay was the overwhelming choice of the membership. Thus on 26 June 1886, Villa appointed what has been described as the world's first football manager. The position predates the modern role of a football manager, the advert used the title 'manager' but the club settled on the title of 'secretary'. Ramsay was responsible for the team, including controlling recruitment and transfers, supported by a specialist trainer, who from 1893 until 1915 was Joe Grierson. The team was selected by the committee each week, which consisted of such figures as William McGregor, Fred Rinder and, following their retirement, former club captains John Devey and Howard Spencer.

Ramsay would hold his position at the club for a remarkable 42 years, in which time Villa won the Football League and FA Cup 6 times each, establishing themselves as the premier football club in England. Villa's style of play under Ramsay consisted of high speed dribbling, short passes and powerful shooting.

There were debuts for Charlie Hobson, Wally Jones, Jack Burton and Richmond Davis.

=== FA Cup details ===
- 1st Round v Walsall Town (A) 5–0
- 2nd Round v Derby County (A) 0–2

== 1886–87 ==
1887 FA Cup final
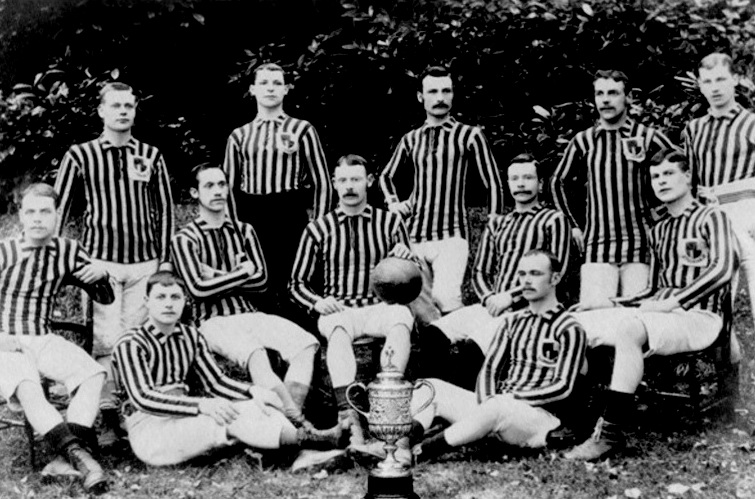
- Aston Villa players posing with the 1887 FA Cup trophy
- Event: 1886–87 FA Cup
Aston Villa	West Bromwich Albion
2	0
- Date: 2 April 1887
- Venue: Kennington Oval, London
- Referee: Francis Marindin
- Attendance: 15,500

Following the professionalisation of football in 1885, the club decided that it needed a full-time paid manager. The following advert was placed in the Birmingham Daily Gazette newspaper in June 1886:

'Wanted: manager for Aston Villa Football Club, who will be required to devote his whole time under direction of the committee. Salary £100 per annum. Applications with reference must be made not later than June 23rd to Chairman of the Committee, Aston Villa Club House, 6 Witton Road, Aston'

Villa received 150 applicants for the role, but with his strong association with the club George Ramsay was the overwhelming choice of the membership. Thus on 26 June 1886, Villa appointed what has been described as the world's first football manager. The position predates the modern role of a football manager, the advert used the title 'manager' but the club settled on the title of 'secretary'. Ramsay was responsible for the team, including controlling recruitment and transfers, supported by a specialist fitness trainer, who from 1893 until 1915 was Joe Grierson. The team was selected by the committee each week, which consisted of such figures as William McGregor, Fred Rinder and, following their retirement, former club captains John Devey and Howard Spencer.

In the 1886–87 season, Villa started their road to The Oval (then the home of FA Cup finals) with a club record 13–0 victory over Wednesbury Old Athletic that still stands today. After Derby Midland were beaten (6–1) Villa needed four matches (three replays) to defeat Wolverhampton Wanderers.

A bye in the fourth round added to victories over Horncastle and Darwen meant that Villa were set for their first Semi-final, against Scottish giants Rangers, to be played at Crewe. In a bid to win the trophy, the Scottish FA allowed Rangers to borrow players from other clubs. Consequently, stars from Queen's Park and Hibernian were amongst the eleven that lined up to face Villa. However Villa won 3–1 to reach their first FA Cup final.

The Final pitted Villa against local rivals West Bromwich Albion. With Albion installed as favourites, thousands travelled from Birmingham and the Black Country to watch the game. Winger Dennis Hodgetts opened the scoring for Villa in bizarre circumstances. The Albion keeper didn't bother to prevent the ball going into the net, as he believed, wrongly, that Hodgetts was offside. The legendary Archie Hunter added Villa's second. He prodded the ball over the goal-line while lying on the floor following a deliberate collision with the West Brom goalkeeper. Such 'attacks' on goalies were legal and commonplace back then. After a goalless second half, Hunter received the trophy, and with it the distinction of being Villa's first FA Cup winning captain.

Villa's team in their first FA Cup Final was as follows- Jimmy Warner (goalkeeper); Frank Coulton, Joseph Simmonds (backs), John Burton, Frankie Dawson, Harry Yates (centre/wing-halves), Richmond Davis, Albert Brown, Archie Hunter (c), Howard Vaughton, Dennis Hodgetts (forwards).

To add gloss to their victory Villa beat, Scottish Cup winners Hibs 3-0 the following Saturday.

There were debut appearances for Dennis Hodgetts (181), Jimmy Warner, Frank Coulton, Harry Yates, and Arthur Loach (3) and .

=== FA Cup details ===
- 1st Round v Wednesbury Old Athletic (H) 13–0 (Villa's all-time record win)
- 2nd Round v Derby Midland (H) 6–1
- 3rd Round v Wolverhampton Wanderers (H) 2–2
- (Replay) v Wolverhampton Wanderers (A) 1–1
- (Replay) v Wolverhampton Wanderers (A) 3–3
- (Replay) v Wolverhampton Wanderers (H) 2–0
- 4th Round Villa received a 'bye'
- 5th Round v Horncastle (H) 5–0
- 6th Round v Darwen (H) 3–2
- Semi-final v Rangers (at Crewe) 3–1
- Final v West Bromwich Albion (at the Oval) 2–0

== 1887–88 ==
The following year was not as successful. With competitive football at a premium, William McGregor (Villa's President) sought to create a competition involving regular matches and wrote to the leading clubs of the time (all based in the North of England and the Midlands).

After some discussion the clubs agreed to set up a twelve team league. Each club would play the other home and away, for a total of twenty-two matches each. Villa were to be joined in the inaugural competition by Stoke, Wolves, West Brom, Notts County, Burnley, Blackburn Rovers, Derby County, Bolton Wanderers, Everton, Accrington (no relation to the present-day Accrington Stanley) and Preston North End. The league was never styled 'the English League' as McGregor envisioned that Scottish clubs would one day wish to join.

There were debuts for Gershom Cox, Harry Devey, Tommy Green and Albert Allen.

=== FA Cup details ===
Second City Derby
- 1--0--0

Meanwhile Villa's last pre-league FA Cup campaign saw the first competitive "Second City derby" occur on Saturday, 5 November 1887 Villa beat Small Heath 4-0 in the second round. Tommy Green scored a brace before half-time with Albert Brown and Albert Allen adding to the score in the second half. This was their first meeting with modern rivals Birmingham City. They would not play again until the local rivals were promoted to the First Division for the 1894–95 season

Preston were a fine side and the match was billed as a clash between England's best teams. This prompted a then-record crowd of 27,000, which the police had some difficulty keeping off the pitch. With Preston leading 3–1 and chaos in the stadium, the clubs tried to calm things down by declaring the match a 'friendly'. However, the FA overruled the decision and decided that the result would stand. Villa, the holders, were out.

- 1st Round v Oldbury Town (A) 4–0
- 2nd Round v Small Heath (A) 4–0
- 3rd Round Villa received a 'bye'
- 4th Round v Shankhouse (A) 9–0
- 5th Round v Preston North End (H) 1–3

== 1888–89 ==
Aston Villa
1888–89 season
- Manager: George Ramsay
- Ground: Wellington Road
- Football League: 2nd
- FA Cup: Round 3
- Top goalscorer: League: All: Albert Allen (19)
Home colours	Away colours

Villa finished as runners-up to Preston's 'Invincibles' double-winning team in their first season in the Football League. Ignominy was suffered in the FA Cup, however, as Villa lost 8–1 to Blackburn Rovers. This still remains their heaviest ever defeat.

There were debuts for Archie Goodall, Batty Garvey, Arthur Dixon, Walter Ashmore, Archie Wollaston, Thomas Harrison and Bob Thomas.

=== FA Cup details ===
- 1st Round v Witton (Lancashire) (H) 3–2
- 2nd Round v Derby County (H) 5–3
- 3rd Round v Blackburn Rovers (A) 1–8

== See also ==
- List of Aston Villa F.C. records and statistics
