= Aston Villa 3–0 Hibernian (1887) =

Aston Villa v Hibernian
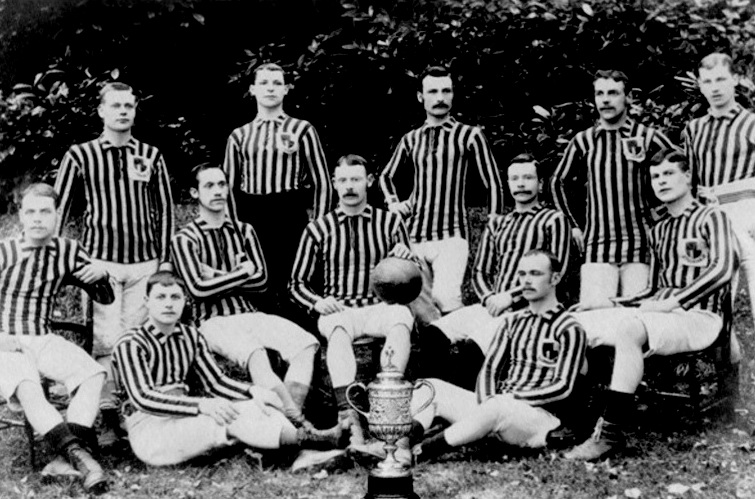
- Aston Villa, winning team
| Aston Villa | Hibernian |
| (England) | (Scotland) |
| 3 | 0 |
- Date: 9 April 1887
- Venue: Perry Barr, Birmingham
- Attendance: 6,000–10,000

The match between Aston Villa and Hibernian was an exhibition football match that took place in the city of Birmingham in April 1887. It was a return match from a friendly played between the sides in January 1887.

The match was advertised in the Birmingham Daily Mail in their 7 April 1887 edition as a "Great International Match". Aston Villa won the match 3–0.

== Overview ==
On 9 April 1887, Scottish Cup holders Hibernian, from Edinburgh, took on FA Cup winners Aston Villa in an exhibition match at the Birmingham club's Perry Barr ground. The sides had both recently won their respective national cups at a time before national football leagues were considered the best side of each country, with The Sportsman describing them as "powerful clubs".

Aston Villa won the match 3–0 and were regarded by many as the best footballing side in the United Kingdom in 1887, being described as having the "right and claim to be the champions of the football world for the year" by the Preston Herald in May 1887. The advert Villa placed in the Birmingham Daily Mail in their 7 April 1887 edition described the game as a great international match; however, the Scottish newspapers The Glasgow Herald and The Scotsman reported on it in similar detail to several other cross-border challenge matches of that weekend, though they did acknowledge the participants' cup-winning statuses. and other newspapers covered other matches on Hibernians' tour of England (which saw them beaten by Stoke and Wolverhampton Wanderers) in similar fashion. The Dundee Evening Telegraph noted that the match was "the most important" of the Scottish clubs' 1887 tour of England as it was between the cup holders and again re-affirmed the matches billing as a "great international match" that "caused immense excitement at Perry Bar[sic], some 10,000 persons looking on".

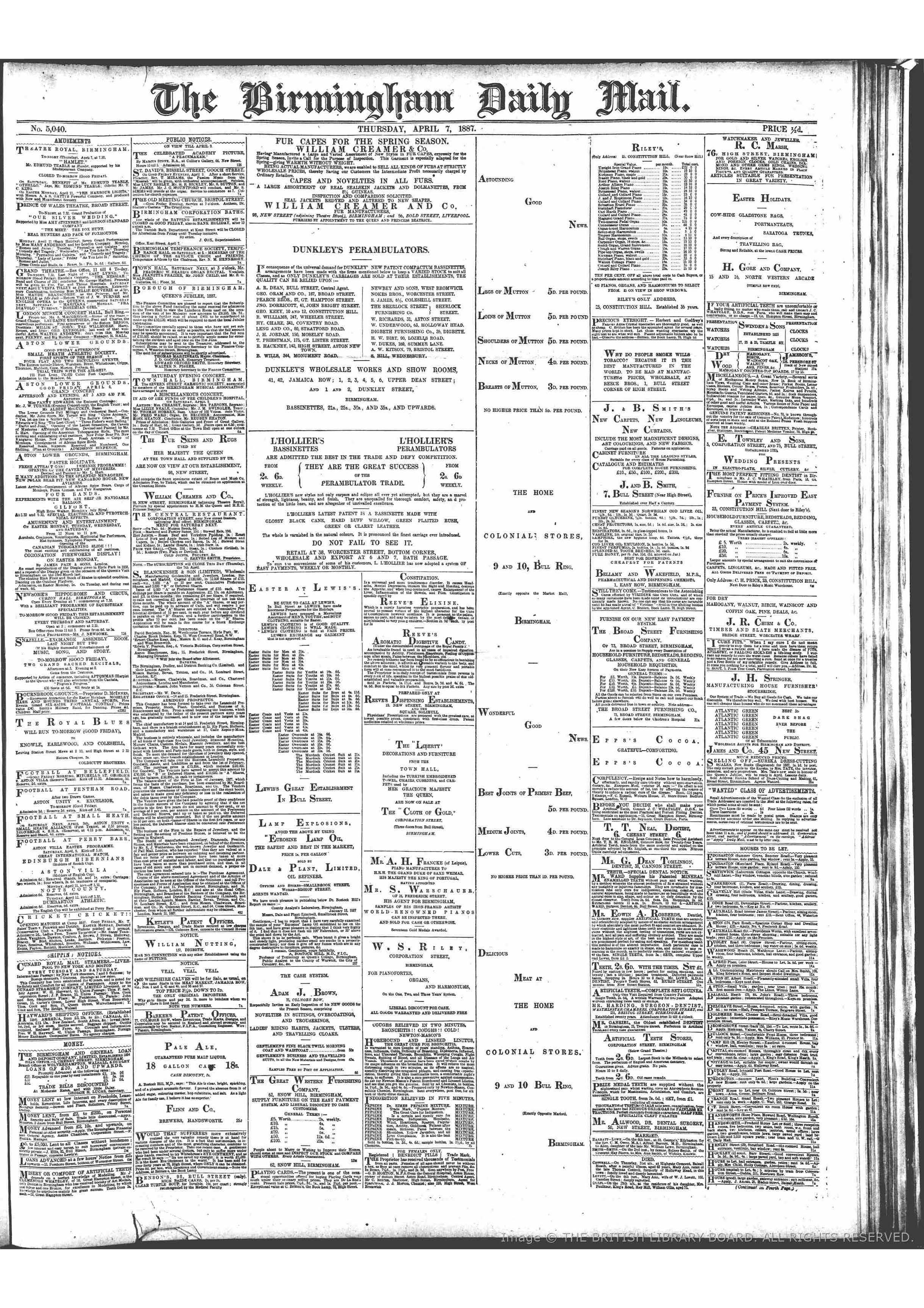
Birmingham Daily Mail highlighting the details of the upcoming Great International Match between Aston Villa and Hibernian in April 1887.

=== Subsequent match ===
Later in 1887, Hibernian won a friendly against 1887 FA Cup semi-finalists Preston North End that was billed as 'The Association Football Championship of the World'. However newspaper reports of the day did not bill the Hibs v Preston game as anything other than a friendly and anyway to qualify for a world championship fixture both teams had to be either a league champion or a cup winner; Preston North End at the time were neither so the Hibs claim is invalid.

== Participant teams ==
| Team | Qualification |
|---|---|
| (England) Aston Villa | 1886–87 FA Cup winners |
| (Scotland) Hibernian | 1886–87 Scottish Cup winners |

== Match details ==
9 April 1887

| Aston Villa (England) | 3–0 | (Scotland) Hibernian |
|---|---|---|
| Hodgetts; Brown; Fagan (o.g.) | Report |

Perry Barr, Birmingham
Attendance: 7,000

| Aston Villa | Hibernian |

| GK | Jimmy Warner |
| FB | Frank Coulton |
| FB | Joseph Simmonds |
| HB | John Burton |
| HB | Harry Yates (substituted off) |
| HB | Frankie Dawson |
| FW | Richmond Davis |
| FW | Albert Brown |
| FW | Archie Hunter |
| FW | Howard Vaughton |
| FW | Dennis Hodgetts |

| GK | John Tobin |
| FB | James Lundie |
| FB | Barney Fagan |
| HB | Paddy Gallacher |
| HB | Peter McGinn |
| HB | James McLaren |
| FW | Patrick Lafferty |
| FW | Willie Groves |
| FW | James McGhee |
| FW | George Smith |
| FW | Philip Clark (substituted off) |
