= 1886–87 Aston Villa F.C. season =

English football club season

Aston Villa
1886–87 season
- Manager: George Ramsay
- FA Cup: Winners

1887 FA Cup final
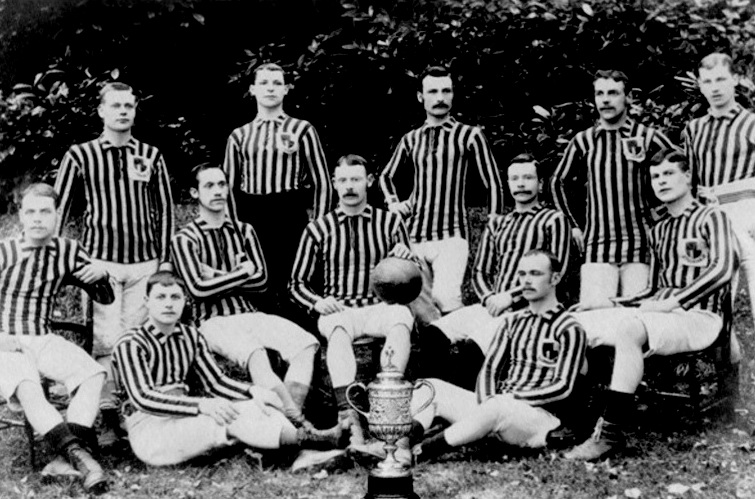
- Aston Villa players posing with the 1887 FA Cup trophy
- Event: 1886–87 FA Cup
Aston Villa	West Bromwich Albion
2	0
- Date: 2 April 1887
- Venue: Kennington Oval, London
- Referee: Francis Marindin
- Attendance: 15,500

The 1886–87 English football season was Aston Villa's 8th season in the Football Association Cup, the top-level football competition at the time. As late as 1901, in the warm weather months, Villa would forgo their heavier woollen club colours in favour of thin cotton red shirts .

Following the professionalisation of football in 1885, the club decided that it needed a full-time paid manager. The following advert was placed in the Birmingham Daily Gazette newspaper in June 1886:

'Wanted: manager for Aston Villa Football Club, who will be required to devote his whole time under direction of the committee. Salary £100 per annum. Applications with reference must be made not later than June 23rd to Chairman of the Committee, Aston Villa Club House, 6 Witton Road, Aston'

Villa received 150 applicants for the role, but with his strong association with the club George Ramsay was the overwhelming choice of the membership. Thus on 26 June 1886, Villa appointed him what has been described as the world's first football manager. The position predates the modern role of a football manager, the advert used the title 'manager' but the club settled on the title of 'secretary'. Ramsay was responsible for the team, including controlling recruitment and transfers, supported by a specialist fitness trainer, who from 1893 until 1915 was Joe Grierson. The team was selected by the committee each week, which consisted of such figures as William McGregor, Fred Rinder and, following their retirement, former club captains John Devey and Howard Spencer.

In the 1886–87 season, Villa started their road to The Oval (then the home of FA Cup finals) with a club record 13–0 victory over Wednesbury Old Athletic that still stands today. After Derby Midland were beaten (6–1) Villa needed four matches (three replays) to defeat Wolverhampton Wanderers.

A bye in the fourth round added to victories over Horncastle and Darwen meant that Villa were set for their first Semi-final, against Scottish giants Rangers, to be played at Crewe. In a bid to win the trophy, the Scottish FA allowed Rangers to borrow players from other clubs. Consequently, stars from Queen's Park and Hibernian were amongst the eleven that lined up to face Villa. However Villa won 3–1 to reach their first FA Cup final.

The following Saturday, Villa defeated Scottish Cup winners Hibs 3-0. Following this result, the club claimed the title of best club in the world.

There were debut appearances for Dennis Hodgetts (181), Jimmy Warner, Frank Coulton, Harry Yates, and Arthur Loach (3)

== FA Cup details ==
30 Oct 1886 1st Round	Aston Villa	13–0	Wednesbury Old Athletic
		Report
Note: 🟩 Villa’s all-time record win

20 Nov 1886 2nd Round	Aston Villa	6–1	Derby Midland
		Report
Note: 🟩

11 Dec 1886 3rd Round	Aston Villa	2–2	Wolverhampton Wanderers
		Report
Note: 🟨

19 Dec 1886 3rd Round Replay	Aston Villa	1–1	Wolverhampton Wanderers
		Report
Note: 🟨 Replay

15 Jan 1887 3rd Round Replay	Wolverhampton Wanderers	3–3	Aston Villa
		Report
Note: 🟨 Replay

29 Jan 1887 3rd Round Replay	Aston Villa	2–0	Wolverhampton Wanderers
		Report
Note: 🟩 Replay

— 4th Round	Aston Villa	—	—
		—
Note: Villa received a bye

5 Feb 1887 5th Round	Aston Villa	5–0	Horncastle
		Report
Note: 🟩 In 1886–87, Horncastle went on its best-ever Cup run. In the first round, the club beat Darlington before 2,000 spectators; the Lincolnshire Chronicle stated the match was "the very best‐bar none‐we have ever witnessed on the Wong," whereas the Northern Echo stated The game was of a very rough character and did not excite much interest.” The club got a bye in the second round, beat Grantham Town at home in the third (before 1,500 spectators) and (after another bye) lost away to eventual winner Aston Villa in the fifth (last 16).

12 Feb 1887 6th Round	Aston Villa	3–2	Darwen
		Report
Note: 🟩

5 Mar 1887 Semi-final	Aston Villa	3–1	Rangers
		Report
Note: 🟩 Semi-final (neutral venue: Crewe)

2 Apr 1887 Final	Aston Villa	2–0	West Bromwich Albion
		Report
Note: 🟩 Final (neutral venue: The Oval): The Final pitted Villa against local rivals West Bromwich Albion. With Albion installed as favourites, thousands travelled from Birmingham and the Black Country to watch the game. Winger Dennis Hodgetts opened the scoring for Villa in bizarre circumstances. The Albion keeper didn't bother to prevent the ball going into the net, as he believed, wrongly, that Hodgetts was offside. The legendary Archie Hunter added Villa's second. He prodded the ball over the goal-line while lying on the floor following a deliberate collision with the West Brom goalkeeper. Such 'attacks' on goalies were legal and commonplace back then. After a goalless second half, Hunter received the trophy, and with it the distinction of being Villa's first FA Cup winning captain. Villa's team in their first FA Cup Final was as follows- Jimmy Warner (goalkeeper); Frank Coulton, Joseph Simmonds (backs), John Burton, Frankie Dawson, Harry Yates (centre/wing-halves), Richmond Davis, Albert Brown, Archie Hunter (c), Howard Vaughton, Dennis Hodgetts (forwards).
