= 1886–87 West Bromwich Albion F.C. season =

1886–87 football season

West Bromwich Albion
1886–87 season
- Chairman: Henry Jackson
- Manager: None (Note: Albion did not have a secretary-manager until 1890 and did not appoint a full-time manager until 1948.)
- Stadium: Stoney Lane
- FA Cup: Runners-up
- Birmingham Senior Cup: Runners-up
- Staffordshire Senior Cup: Winners
- Birmingham Charity Cup: Semi-final
- Walsall Senior Cup: Unknown (Note: The source states that Albion lost to Walsall Town, but does not specify in which round.)
- Top goalscorer: League: N/A (Note: There was no league football in England until 1888–89.); All: Jem Bayliss (21) (Note: Includes all matches in the FA Cup, Birmingham Senior Cup, Staffordshire Senior Cup and Birmingham Charity Cup. The first round only of the Walsall Senior Cup is included, since subsequent rounds were contested by Albion's reserve team.)
- Highest home attendance: 12,000 (vs Aston Villa, 9 October 1886)
- Lowest home attendance: 2,500 (vs Crosswells Brewery, 16 October 1886); 2,500 (vs Stafford Rangers, 6 November 1886)
- Average home league attendance: 5,191
Home colours

The 1886–87 season was the ninth season in the history of West Bromwich Albion Football Club. The club reached the FA Cup final for the second successive season, but again finished as runners-up, losing 0–2 to local rivals Aston Villa. Albion also reached the final of two regional cup competitions, winning the Staffordshire Senior Cup and finishing as runners-up in the Birmingham Senior Cup. In addition, they took part in the Walsall Senior Cup and Birmingham Charity Cup, as well as playing a number of friendly matches.

== FA Cup ==
West Bromwich Albion began their fourth FA Cup season with a 6–0 first round victory against Burton Wanderers, in what was their only home match of the tournament. They followed this up with a 2–1 win away at Derby Junction. Albion's second goal in the match was credited to their goalkeeper Bob Roberts, after his long kick downfield ended up in Derby's goal following a goalmouth scrum. Albion then received a bye to the fourth round, where Tommy Green scored the only game of the game against Mitchell St. George's at Aston Lower Grounds. In round five, a goal from George Woodhall gave Albion a victory over Lockwood Brothers, but a dispute over the goal led to the tie being replayed. Tommy Green scored in the replay, putting Albion into the quarter-finals for the third season in succession. Notts County provided the opposition and two goals from Jem Bayliss contributed to a 4–1 victory for West Bromwich Albion.

In the semi-final, Albion took on Preston North End at Trent Bridge. Preston took the lead, but two goals from Tom Pearson and one from Bill Paddock saw Albion reach the final for the second year running. In the final, the team faced local rivals Aston Villa at the Kennington Oval, to determine which side would be the first from the Midlands to win the FA Cup. Villa's goalkeeper Jimmy Warner made a number of saves in a goalless first 45 minutes, and it was they who took the lead in the second half when Dennis Hodgetts scored. Bob Roberts, Albion's goalkeeper, made no attempt to save the shot, wrongly assuming that Hodgetts was offside. Villa captain Archie Hunter added a second goal for Villa near the end as Albion again finished as runners-up.

Round	Date	Opponent	Venue	Result (Note: West Bromwich Albion's score is listed first, regardless of venue or result.)	Goalscorers	Attendance
1	30 October 1886	Burton Wanderers	H	6–0	T. Green 2, Bayliss 2, Holden, Paddock	5,107
2	20 November 1886	Derby Junction	A	2–1	G. Bell, Roberts	2,100
3	Albion received a bye to the fourth round					
4	15 January 1887	Mitchell St. George's	N	1–0	T. Green	4,061
5	29 January 1887	Lockwood Brothers	A	1–0 (Note: The match was replayed due to a dispute over the goal.)	Woodhall	6,029
5(R)	12 February 1887	Lockwood Brothers	A	1–0	T. Green, Paddock	2,120
6	19 February 1887	Notts County	A	4–1	Bayliss 2, T. Green, Woodhall	15,067
SF	5 March 1887	Preston North End	N	3–1	Pearson 2, Paddock	16,068
F	2 April 1887	Aston Villa	N	0–2	—	15,534

Source for match details:

== Birmingham Senior Cup ==
Albion, taking part in the Birmingham Senior Cup for the sixth time, beat Aston Villa in the first round by a Tommy Green goal. The match was played in front of 12,000 spectators, the club's largest home attendance of the season and their largest all-time home attendance in the Birmingham Senior Cup. Albion were also drawn at home in the next three rounds and continued to keep clean sheets, defeating Mitchell St George's 3–0, Derby County 6–0 and Stoke 3–0. The semi-final was held at Stoke's Victoria Ground, where Burslem Port Vale provided the opposition. A Jem Bayliss hat-trick contributed to a 5–1 victory as Albion reached the final for the second season running. They were unable to retain the trophy however, as they lost by a single goal to Long Eaton Rangers at Wellington Road. (Note: Team name as per Willmore pp. 20–21. Matthews (1987) refers to the team as Long Eaton Rovers.)

Round	Date	Opponent	Venue	Result	Goalscorers	Attendance
1	9 October 1886	Aston Villa	H	1–0	T. Green	12,000
2	13 November 1886	Mitchell St George's	H	3–0	T. Green, Woodhall 2	3,000
3	11 December 1886	Derby County	H	6–0	Paddock 2, T. Green 2, Bayliss, Woodhall	8,000
4	19 March 1887	Stoke	H	3–0	Pearson 2, Bayliss	5,100
SF	30 April 1887	Burslem Port Vale	N	5–1	Bayliss 3, Woodhall 2	4,000
F	7 May 1887	Long Eaton Rangers	N	0–1	—	5,000

Source for match details:

== Staffordshire Senior Cup ==
Participating in their fifth Staffordshire Senior Cup campaign, Albion beat Hednesford Town 8–0 in the first round; Bayliss led the scoring with four goals. Albion were also given home ties in the next two rounds, defeating Stafford Rangers 5–1 and Leek 3–0. The semi-final took place in Burslem; Albion won 3–0 with two goals from Jem Bayliss and one from George Timmins. In the final, at Stoke's Victoria Ground, Albion beat Walsall Swifts 4–0. Two goals from Bayliss and one each from Woodhall and Paddock meant that Albion retained the trophy, winning the competition for the third time in all.

Round	Date	Opponent	Venue	Result	Goalscorers	Attendance
1	4 October 1886	Hednesford Town	H	8–0	Bayliss 4, G. Bell 2, T. Green 2	3,000
2	6 November 1886	Stafford Rangers	H	5–1	G. Bell, Timmins, Bayliss 2, Woodhall	2,500
3	26 February 1887	Leek	H	3–0	Bayliss 2, Woodhall	3,500
SF	21 March 1887	Wolverhampton Wanderers	N	3–0	Bayliss 2, Timmins	4,000
F	9 April 1887	Walsall Swifts	N	4–0	Bayliss 2, Woodhall, Paddock	4,000

Source for match details:

== Birmingham Charity Cup ==
Entering the Birmingham Charity Cup for the third time, Albion drew 3–3 with Wolverhampton Wanderers in the semi-final. The replay finished goalless after extra time, meaning that a second replay was required. Wolves won the second replay, 3–1.

Round	Date	Opponent	Venue	Result	Goalscorers	Attendance
SF	18 April 1887	Wolverhampton Wanderers	A	3–3	Pearson, Woodhall, T. Green	8,000
SF(R)	20 April 1887	Wolverhampton Wanderers	A	0–0 (Note: After extra time.)	—	6,000
SF(2R)	25 April 1887	Wolverhampton Wanderers	H	1–3	Paddock	7,200

Source for match details:

== Walsall Senior Cup ==
Unusually for a competition in which they usually entered a reserve team, West Bromwich Albion put out their first team for the Walsall Senior Cup round one match against Crosswells Brewery. Albion won the match 5–2, against a brewery side that included seven former Albion players in their team. West Bromwich Albion's reserve team completed the remainder of the club's fixtures in the competition, losing to Walsall Town in an unspecified later round.

Round	Date	Opponent	Venue	Result	Goalscorers	Attendance
1	16 October 1886	Crosswells Brewery	H	5–2	Holden, Pearson, Horton 2, Moore (o.g.)	2,500

Source for match details:

== Friendlies and benefit matches ==
With league football yet to be established, West Bromwich Albion played in a number of friendly matches throughout the season.

Date	Opponent	Venue	Result
19 July 1886	Aston Villa (Note: Testimonial match for S. Richardson)	A	5–1
24 July 1886	Aston Villa	A	3–6
26 July 1886	Wednesbury Old Athletic	H	6–0
4 September 1886	Wolverhampton Wanderers	A	2–0
11 September 1886	Stoke	A	4–0
18 September 1886	Third Lanark Rifle Volunteers	A	2–1
20 September 1886	Hibernian	A	1–1
25 September 1886	Northwich Victoria	H	2–1
27 September 1886	Birmingham & District XI (Note: Benefit match)	H	0–0
2 October 1886	Derby Midland	H	3–1
23 October 1886	Bolton Wanderers	A	0–1
1 November 1886	Oxford University	H	6–1
27 November 1886	Old Carthusians	H	5–1
4 December 1886	Preston North End	A	0–7
18 December 1886	Aston Villa	A	1–1
27 December 1886	Preston North End	H	5–1
28 December 1886	Bolton Wanderers	H	1–2
22 January 1887	Notts County (Note: The source refers to the team as Nottingham County.)	A	1–3
5 February 1887	Aston Unity	H	5–0
7 February 1887	Oxford University	A	3–2
12 March 1887	Wolverhampton Wanderers	H	0–0
26 March 1887	Birmingham Excelsior	H	3–0
11 April 1887	Third Lanark Rifle Volunteers	H	3–1
16 April 1887	Darwen	H	4–0
14 May 1887	Aston Villa	H	3–1
16 May 1887	Great Bridge Unity	A	0–0
21 May 1887	Stoke	H	1–0
28 May 1887	Bolton Wanderers	H	2–0
30 May 1887	Blackburn Rovers	H	3–0
4 June 1887	Wolverhampton Wanderers	A	0–1
18 June 1887	South Shore	A	3–2
20 June 1887	Fleetwood Rangers	A	3–1

Source for match details:

== See also ==
- 1886–87 in English football
