= 1888–89 Aston Villa F.C. season =

English football club season

Aston Villa
1888–89 season
- Manager: George Ramsay
- Ground: Wellington Road
- Football League: 2nd
- FA Cup: Round 3
- Top goalscorer: League: All: Albert Allen (19)
Home colours	Away colours

The Football League
- Season: 1888–89
- Champions: Preston North End; 1st English title
- Matches: 132
- Goals: 586 (4.44 per match)
- Top goalscorer: John Goodall, PNE (21 goals)
- Biggest home win: Aston Villa 9–1 Notts County (29 September 1888)
- Biggest away win: Notts County 0–7 Preston NE (3 November 1888)
- Highest scoring: Blackburn 5–5 Accrington (15 September 1888); Aston Villa 9–1 Notts County (29 September 1888); Bolton 7–3 Notts County (9 March 1889)
- Longest winning run: 6 matches Preston North End
- Longest unbeaten run: 22 matches Preston North End
- Longest losing run: 8 matches Derby County

The 1888–89 English football season saw Aston Villa's 1st season in the Football League in the Football League inaugural season. (Note: Up until 1992, the top division of English football was the Football League First Division. The Premier League took over from the First Division as the top tier of the English football league system upon its formation in 1992. The First Division then became the second tier of English football, the Second Division became the third tier and so on. The First Division is now known as the Football League Championship, while the Second Division is now known as Football League One.) In the late 1880s, Birmingham and the surrounding region boasted many of the country's strongest football teams. Aston Villa were one of the new league's 12 founding members and finished as runners-up behind double winners Preston North End. The 'Invincibles' from Lancashire also ended Villa's bid to win every single home game, with a 2–0 win at Wellington Road in Villa's last home fixture.

Villa's cup season ended with an 8–1 defeat by Blackburn Rovers that remained a club record until 2012.

Local businessman, George Kynoch was appointed president of the club in 1888.

On 1 October 1888 Archie Goodall signed for Aston Villa. Goodall's move from Preston North End was the first transfer during a season to be approved by the Football League. Goodall, playing at centre – half, made his Aston Villa debut on 13 October 1888, at Wellington Road, the then home of Aston Villa. Aston Villa defeated the visitors, Blackburn Rovers, 6 – 1 and Goodall scored the second of Aston Villa’ six goals. Goodall appeared in 14 of the 18 League matches and scored seven League goals. Goodall played in defence, midfield and the forward–line for Aston Villa. Playing as a full–back/centre–half (four appearances) he was part of a defence-line that kept the opposition to one–League–goal–in–a–match once. Playing as a wing–half (five appearances) he was part of a midfield that achieved a big (three-League-goals-or-more) win once. As a forward (five appearances) he played in a front-line that scored three–League–goals–or–more on three occasions. Goodall's seven League goals for Aston Villa included two–League–goals–in–a–match twice. Goodall scored both Villa goals against Wolverhampton Wanderers in a 2 – 1 win at Wellington Road on 24 November 1888. On 8 December 1888 Goodall scored the second and fourth goals as Villa defeated Notts County 4 – 2 at Trent Bridge, the then home of Notts County.

In May 1889 Goodall signed for Derby County. There were also debuts for Batty Garvey, Arthur Dixon, Walter Ashmore, Archie Wollaston, Thomas Harrison and Bob Thomas

As late as 1901, in the warm weather months, Villa would forgo their heavier woollen club colours in favour of thin cotton red shirts .

== League ==
Pos	Team	Pld	W	D	L	GF	GA	GAv	Pts
1	Preston North End (C)	22	18	4	0	74	15	4.933	40
2	Aston Villa	22	12	5	5	61	43	1.419	29
3	Wolverhampton Wanderers	22	12	4	6	51	37	1.378	28
4	Blackburn Rovers	22	10	6	6	66	45	1.467	26
5	Bolton Wanderers	22	10	2	10	63	59	1.068	22

Source: World Football
Rules for classification: 1) Points; 2) Goal average; 3) Goals scored
(C) Champions

=== Matches ===
Aston Villa's score comes first

Win	Draw	Loss

Match	Date	Opponent	Venue	Result	Attendance	Scorers
1	8 September 1888	Wolverhampton Wanderers	Dudley Road	1–1	2,500	Green
2	15 September 1888	Stoke	Wellington Road	5–1	4,000	Dixon, Brown, Green, Hunter, Allen
3	22 September 1888	Everton	H	2–1	4,000	Hodgetts (2)
4	29 September 1888	Notts County	H	9–1	4,000	Green (3), Allen (3), Hunter (2), Hodgetts
5	6 October 1888	Everton	Anfield	0–2	10,000	
6	13 October 1888	Blackburn Rovers	H	6–1	5,000	Goodall, Green, Brown, Allen (2), Hunter
7	20 October 1888	Bolton Wanderers	A	3–2	8,000	Hodgetts, Hunter, Allen
8	27 October 1888	Accrington	H	4–3	6,000	Allen, Brown (2), Hodgetts
9	3 November 1888	Stoke	A	1–1	4,000	Allen
10	10 November 1888	Preston North End	A	1–1	10,000	Green
11	17 November 1888	Blackburn Rovers	A	1–5	9,500	Allen
12	24 November 1888	Wolverhampton Wanderers	H	2–1	6,000	Goodall (2)
13	8 December 1888	Notts County	A	4–2	2,000	Goodall (2), Brown, Green
14	15 December 1888	Accrington	A	1–1	2,000	Brown
15	22 December 1888	Burnley	H	4–2	2,000	Green, Goodall, Allen, Hunter
16	29 December 1888	Derby County	H	4–2	4,000	Green (2), Allen, Goodall
17	5 January 1889	Burnley	A	0–4	6,000	
18	12 January 1889	Bolton Wanderers	H	6–2	2,000	Brown, Allen, Hodgetts, Hunter, Green (2)
19	19 January 1889	West Bromwich Albion	H	2–0	10,000	Allen, Hodgetts
20	26 January 1889	West Bromwich Albion	A	3–3	8,515	Allen (2), Green
21	9 February 1889	Preston North End	Wellington Road	0–2	10,000	
22	9 March 1889	Derby County	A	2–5	3,000	Allen (2)

== FA Cup ==
Round	Date	Opponent	Venue	Result	Attendance	Scorers
R1	2 February 1889	Witton	H	3–2	1,500	Allen, Hunter, Green
R2	16 February 1889	Derby County	H	5–3	2,000	Hunter (2), Hodgetts (2), Brown
R3	2 March 1889	Blackburn Rovers	A	1–8	12,000	Hodgetts

== Birmingham Senior Cup ==
When Ironbridge F.C. entered the Birmingham Senior Cup for the first time, after a surprise win over Burton Swifts, and a walkover over Derby Midland. they reached the semi-final of the Birmingham cup against Aston Villa at the latter's Wellington Road ground and went down 9–1, the Villans going on to win the final. The tie was meant to be played at Wolverhampton, but the Villans offered Ironbridge £20 and a friendly at Hill Top to switch to Aston, and the difference in the two sides was shown by the Villans including seven of the XI which played in the 1887 FA Cup Final, while the Ironsides' captain, Walter Baguley, was landlord of the All Nations pub in Madeley.

== Appearances ==
Pos.	Name	League		FA Cup		Total	
Pos.	Name	Apps	Goals	Apps	Goals	Apps	Goals
FW	(England) Albert Allen	21	18	3	1	24	19
GK	(England) Walter Ashmore	1	0	0	0	1	0
FW	(England) Arthur Brown	22	7	3	1	25	8
HB	(England) John Burton	16	0	3	0	19	0
FB	(England) Frank Coulton	19	0	2	0	21	0
FB	(England) Gershom Cox	22	0	3	0	25	0
HB	(England) Frankie Dawson	3	0	0	0	3	0
HB	(England) Harry Devey	21	0	3	0	24	0
HB	(England) Arthur Dixon	3	1	0	0	3	1
FW	(England) Batty Garvey	2	0	0	0	2	0
FW	(Ireland) Archie Goodall	14	7	0	0	14	7
FW	(England) Tommy Green	22	15	3	1	25	16
FW	(England) Thomas Harrison	1	0	0	0	1	0
FW	(England) Dennis Hodgetts	17	7	3	3	20	10
FW	(Scotland) Archie Hunter	19	6	3	3	22	9
GK	(England) Jimmy Warner	21	0	3	0	24	0
HB	(England) Arthur Wollaston	4	0	1	0	5	0
HB	(England) Harry Yates	13	0	2	0	15	0
