= 1887–88 Aston Villa F.C. season =

Aston Villa
1887–88 season
- Manager: George Ramsay
- Ground: Wellington Road
- FA Cup: 5th

The 1887–88 English football season was Aston Villa's 9th season in the Football Association Cup, the top-level football competition at the time. On the eve of their "Great Football Fight" with Preston North End in the fifth round of the FA Cup, Villa had played 28 matches since 1 September, winning 27 while having six first-team players unavailable for their only loss.

With competitive football at a premium, William McGregor (Villa's President) worked to create a competition involving regular matches and wrote to the leading clubs of the time (all based in the North of England and the Midlands). After some discussion the clubs agreed to set up a twelve team league. Each club would play the other home and away, for a total of twenty-two matches each. Villa were to be joined in the inaugural competition by Stoke, Wolves, West Brom, Notts County, Burnley, Blackburn Rovers, Derby County, Bolton Wanderers, Everton, Accrington (no relation to the present-day Accrington Stanley) and Preston North End. The league was never styled 'the English League' as McGregor envisioned that Scottish clubs would one day wish to join.

As late as 1901, in the warm weather months, Villa would forgo their heavier woollen club colours in favour of thin cotton red shirts .

== FA Cup ==
1st Round	Oldbury Town	0–4	Aston Villa
		Report
Note: The newly formed Oldbury Town immediately entered the FA Cup, although there was some confusion in the media, listing the club's entry as under the name of Crosswells; the support for the latter club seems to have transferred to the more inclusive Oldbury, which claimed to be the successor club to Crosswells. In the first round the club was drawn against Aston Villa, and a 4–0 home defeat against the Cup holders was not disgraceful in the circumstances; indeed Town kept the score to two until the last ten minutes, and had a goal disallowed.

5 November 1887 2nd Round	Small Heath Alliance	0–4	Aston Villa	Muntz Street
		Report	Green 2, Brown, Allen	Attendance: 12,000
Note: Villa's last pre-league FA Cup campaign saw the first competitive "Second City derby" occur on Saturday, 5 November 1887. The large crowd chose football in favour of Buffalo Bill's Wild West tour at the Aston Lower Grounds. Villa beat Small Heath 4–0 in the second round. Tommy Green scored a brace before half-time with Albert Brown and Albert Allen adding to the score in the second half. This was their first meeting with modern rivals Birmingham City. They would not play again until the local rivals were promoted to the First Division for the 1894–95 season

- 3rd Round: Aston Villa received a bye

4th Round	Shankhouse	0–9	Aston Villa	St James' Park
		Report
Note:

5th Round, 7 January 1888	Aston Villa	1–3	Preston North End	Wellington Road
		Report		Attendance: 26,849
Note: Wellington Road's record attendance of 26,849 was set for an FA Cup fifth round match against Preston North End on 7 January 1888. Preston won 3–1, and the match was marred by a huge pitch invasion, the first serious incidence of crowd trouble in English football. Preston were a fine side and the match was billed as a clash between England's best teams. This prompted a then-record crowd which the police had some difficulty keeping off the pitch. With Preston leading 3–1 and chaos in the stadium, the clubs tried to calm things down by declaring the match a 'friendly'. However, the FA overruled the decision and decided that the result would stand. Villa, the holders, were out.

== Birmingham Charity Cup ==
Walsall Town F.C. and Walsall Swifts F.C. had amalgamated. Walsall Town Swifts' inaugural match was a 0–0 draw against Aston Villa in the Birmingham Charity Cup final on 9 April 1888. A disagreement over the venue of the replay meant Aston Villa were awarded the trophy.

== Birmingham Senior Cup ==
First Round	Aston Villa	11–0	Warwick County	Wellington Road
Note:

Second Round	Aston Villa	5–0	Wednesbury Old Athletic	Wellington Road
Note:

Third Round	Aston Villa	4–1	Notts Rangers	Wellington Road
Note:

Final	Aston Villa	3–2	West Bromwich Albion	Aston Lower Grounds

== Friendlies ==
Aston Villa	8–0	London Caledonians	Wellington Road
Note:

Aston Villa	4–1	Wednesbury Old Athletic	Wellington Road
Note:

Aston Villa	7–1	Burton Wanderers	Wellington Road
Note:

Aston Villa	5–0	Long Eaton Rangers	Wellington Road
Note:

Aston Villa	6–1	Sheffield Wednesday	Wellington Road
Note:

Aston Villa	4–2	Welsh Druids	Wellington Road
Note:

Aston Villa	4–3	Walsall Town	Wellington Road
Note:

London Caledonians	0–4	Aston Villa
Note:

Aston Villa	3–0	Small Heath Alliance	Wellington Road
Note:

Notts County	8–2	Aston Villa
Note: Aston Villa were without six first-team players who were representing Birmingham Association this day.

Aston Villa	2–0	Halliwell	Wellington Road
Note:

Aston Villa	12–1	Lockwood Brothers	Wellington Road
Note:

Aston Villa	9–0	Aston Unity	Wellington Road
Note:

Blackburn Olympic	1–2	Aston Villa
Note:

Aston Villa	15–0	Horncastle	Wellington Road
Note:

Aston Villa	7–0	Oxford University	Wellington Road
Note:

Stoke	2–4	Aston Villa
Note:

Derby County	0–3	Aston Villa
Note:

Aston Villa	9–0	South Shore	Wellington Road
Note:

Aston Villa	12–0	Cambridge University	Wellington Road

Aston Villa	3–0	Battlefield	Wellington Road
Note:

Aston Villa	7–2	Mitchell's St. George's	Wellington Road
Note:

Aston Villa	1–0	London Casuals	Wellington Road

== Players ==
There were debuts for Gershom Cox, Harry Devey, Tommy Green and Albert Allen. Inside-forward Allen became Villa's first England international scoring three goals in a 5–1 victory over Ireland in April 1888.
