= 1887–88 in English football =

Football in England
- Season: 1887–88

Men's football
- FA Cup: West Bromwich Albion

The 1887–88 season was the 17th season of competitive football in England.

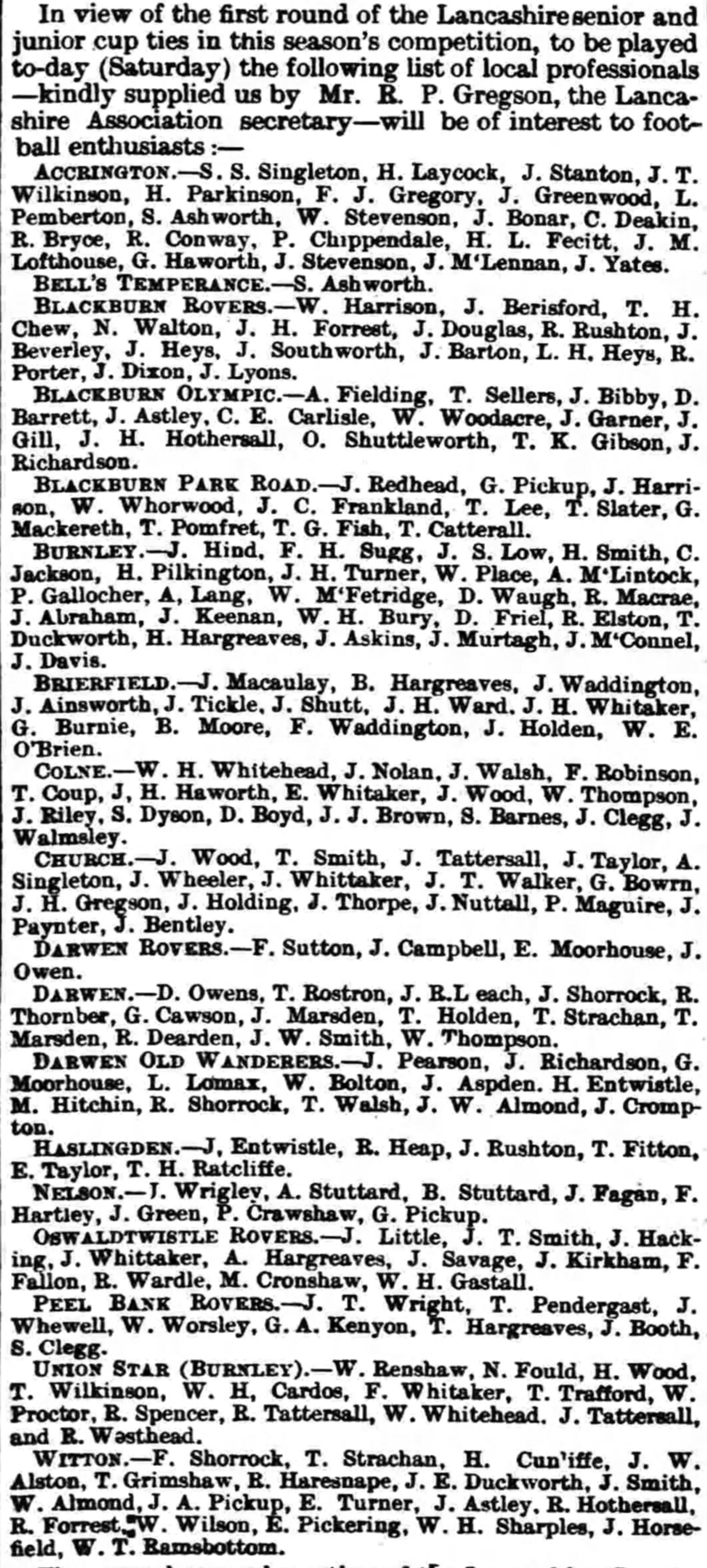
List of professional footballers in Lancashire in the 1887–88 season, Blackburn Weekly Standard, 1 October 1887

Albert Allen, of Aston Villa, scored three goals against Ireland in his only appearance for England. The last pre-league FA Cup campaign saw the first competitive "Second City derby" occur on Saturday, 5 November 1887. Villa beat Small Heath 4-0 in the fifth round. Tommy Green scored a brace before half-time with Albert Brown and Allen adding to the score in the second half.

== National team ==
England won the 1888 British Home Championship, their first victory in the tournament, with comfortable victories over all three other home nations, in each of which England scored five goals.

| Date | Venue | Opponents | Score* | Comp | England scorers |
|---|---|---|---|---|---|
| 4 February 1888 | Nantwich Road, Crewe (H) | Wales | 5–1 | BHC | Fred Dewhurst (Preston North End) (15 & 65 mins), George Woodhall (West Bromwich Albion) (70 mins), Tinsley Lindley (Cambridge University) (75 mins) & John Goodall (Preston North End) 88 mins) |
| 17 March 1888 | (Second) Hampden Park, Glasgow (A) | Scotland | 5–0 | BHC | Tinsley Lindley (Cambridge University) (32 mins), Dennis Hodgetts (Aston Villa) (34 mins), Fred Dewhurst (Preston North End) (40 & 49 mins) & John Goodall (Preston North End) (43 mins) |
| 31 March 1888 | Ballynafeigh Park, Belfast (A) | Ireland | 5–1 | BHC | Fred Dewhurst (Preston North End) (10 mins), Albert Allen (Aston Villa)(14, 39 & 60 mins) & Tinsley Lindley (Cambridge University) |

* England score given first

Key

- H = Home match
- A = Away match
- BHC = British Home Championship

== Honours ==
| Competition | Winner |
|---|---|
| FA Cup | West Bromwich Albion (1) |

Notes = Number in parentheses is the times that club has won that honour. * indicates new record for competition
