= Arthur Brown (footballer, born 1858) =

English footballer

Digger Brown
Personal information
- Full name: Arthur Brown
- Date of birth: 3 December 1858
- Place of birth: Spon End, Coventry, England
- Date of death: 1 July 1909 (aged 50)
- Place of death: Aston, Birmingham, England
- Position: Forward

Youth career
- Aston Cross
- Aston Unity
- Aston Comrades

Senior career*
Years	Team	Apps	(Gls)
1878–1879	Aston Villa		
- Mitchell St George's
- Birchfield Trinity
- Birmingham Excelsior
1880–1886	Aston Villa	0	(0)

International career
1882	England	3	(4)
- * Club domestic league appearances and goals

Arthur Brown (3 December 1858 – 1 July 1909) was an English footballer who played for Aston Villa in the 1880s. He was their first international player, making three appearances for England in 1882. Throughout his career he was known as "Digger" Brown.

== Playing career ==
Brown was born in Spon End, Coventry, the elder brother of Albert Arthur Brown who would also go on to have a career as a footballer with Aston Villa. Arthur began his career playing for local junior sides including Aston Cross, Aston Unity and Aston Comrades before joining the most senior club in the area, Aston Villa in 1878. His initial spell at Villa only lasted a few weeks before he left to join Mitchell St George's.

Two years later, after spells with Birchfield Trinity and Birmingham Excelsior, he re-joined Aston Villa. He made his debut on 4 Dec 1880 in the FA cup 2nd round victory against Nottingham Forest at Trent Bridge becoming the 16th player to represent the club in premier competition. His favoured position was at inside right but he could play on either wing. Contemporary reports described him as "sturdy, though small, he could dribble through opponents with astonishing ease and grace."

His first England cap came against Ireland on 18 February 1882 when he played alongside his Villa colleague Howard Vaughton. England's 13–0 victory is still the team's largest ever win; the Villa forwards "totally dominated" scoring nine goals between them, with Vaughton scoring five and Brown four. Brown "seemed set for a lengthy career" but, although he played in the two other 1882 internationals against Wales and Scotland (both of which resulted in defeats) he was never again selected for England. His international career spanned 23 days, in which he played three matches scoring four goals.

His club career was before the inception of The Football League and all Brown's club games were in friendlies and in the FA Cup. During his Villa career he played 22 FA Cup matches, scoring 15 goals, often playing alongside his team captain, Archie Hunter. By 1886, ill-health had forced Brown to retire and he therefore missed out on the inaugural Football League season.

He continued to keep up an interest in Villa's affairs until he died on 1 July 1909, aged 50.

== Professional baseball ==
In 1890 Brown played professional baseball for Aston Villa in the National League of Baseball of Great Britain.

== Honours ==
Aston Villa

- National League of Baseball: 1890
