= Tommy Green (footballer, born 1913) =

English footballer

Personal information
- Full name: Thomas Green
- Date of birth: 12 May 1913
- Place of birth: Droitwich, England
- Date of death: 5 February 1997 (aged 83)
- Place of death: Bromyard, England
- Height: 5 ft 8 1/2 in (1.74 m)
- Position: Inside forward

Youth career
- Droitwich Town
- Droitwich Spa
- Droitwich Comrades
- 1931–1932: West Bromwich Albion (amateur)

Senior career*
Years	Team	Apps	(Gls)
1932–1936	West Bromwich Albion	13	(3)
1936–1939	West Ham United		
1939–1941	Coventry City		
1941–1945	Worcester City		
1945–1949	Bromyard		

Managerial career
- 1949–1951: Bromyard Sports
- * Club domestic league appearances and goals

Thomas Green (12 May 1913 – 1997) was an English footballer who played as an inside forward. Green was born in Droitwich, Worcestershire. His father, also named Tommy Green, had a career as a footballer and had also played for West Bromwich Albion. Green Jr attended St Peter's School in Worcester before playing for Droitwich Town, Droitwich Spa and Droitwich Comrades. He signed for West Bromwich Albion as an amateur in October 1931 and turned professional in March 1932. Green made his debut against Leeds United in February 1934 and went on to score five goals in 16 appearances. He transferred to West Ham United in December 1936, for a £3,000 fee, scoring six goals in 44 first-team appearances for the East London club. In March 1939 he returned to the Midlands in order to join Coventry City. After scoring twice in nine games for Coventry, he moved to Worcester City in 1941, before finishing his playing career at Bromyard F.C (1945–1949). He managed Bromyard Sports from 1949 to 1951. Green died in Bromyard, Herefordshire, on 5 February 1997.
