= 1885–86 Aston Villa F.C. season =

Aston Villa
1885–86 season
- President: W. M. Ellis
- Chairman: William McGregor
- FA Cup: 2nd round

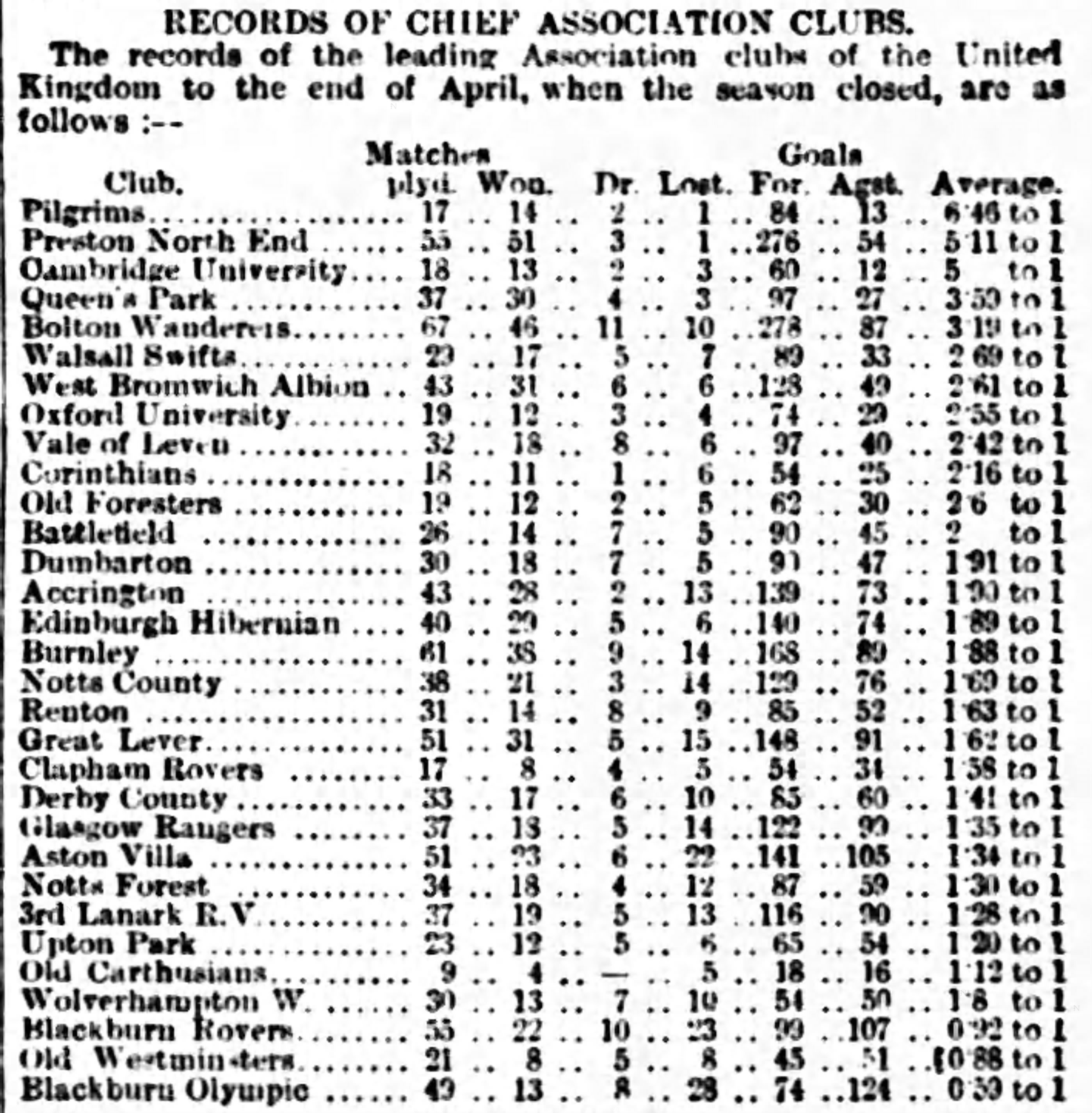
An early form of table ranking the leading clubs by goal average, Newcastle Daily Chronicle, 13 May 1886

The 1885–86 English football season was Aston Villa's 7th season in the Football Association Cup, the top-level football competition at the time. This year saw Villa's most modest Cup performance since their first effort to win the trophy, in 1880. Villa were beaten in the second round by Derby County. As late as 1901, in the warm weather months, Villa would forgo their heavier woollen club colours in favour of thin cotton red shirts .

Following the professionalisation of football in 1885, the club decided that it needed a full-time paid manager. The following advert was placed in the Birmingham Daily Gazette newspaper in June 1886:

'Wanted: manager for Aston Villa Football Club, who will be required to devote his whole time under direction of the committee. Salary £100 per annum. Applications with reference must be made not later than June 23rd to Chairman of the Committee, Aston Villa Club House, 6 Witton Road, Aston’

Villa received 150 applicants for the role, but with his strong association with the club George Ramsay was the overwhelming choice of the membership. Thus on 26 June 1886, Villa appointed what has been described as the world's first football manager. The position predates the modern role of a football manager, the advert used the title 'manager' but the club settled on the title of 'secretary'. Ramsay was responsible for the team, including controlling recruitment and transfers, supported by a specialist trainer, who from 1893 until 1915 was Joe Grierson. The team was selected by the committee each week, which consisted of such figures as William McGregor, Fred Rinder and, following their retirement, former club captains John Devey and Howard Spencer.

Ramsay would hold his position at the club for a remarkable 42 years, in which time Villa won the Football League and FA Cup 6 times each, establishing themselves as the premier football club in England. Villa's style of play under Ramsay consisted of high speed dribbling, short passes and powerful shooting.

Denny Hodgetts signed for Villa in February 1886. There were debuts for Charlie Hobson, Wally Jones, Jack Burton and Richmond Davis.

== FA Cup details ==
1st Round	Aston Villa	5–0	Walsall Town
		Report
Note: 🟩

2nd Round	Aston Villa	0–2	Derby County
		Report
Note: 🟥 The victory over Aston Villa, who were established was one of the major forces in the English game at the time, was arguably one of the most important in the Derby's history as it attracted better opposition in friendlies and made Derby a prominent enough club to be one of the 12 founder members of The Football League when it was formed in 1888.

== Friendlies ==
5 September 1885	Aston Villa	1–2	Blackburn Olympic	Wellington Road
Note:

12 September 1885	West Bromwich Albion	v	Aston Villa
Note:

26 September 1885	Blackburn Rovers	v	Aston Villa
Note:

3 October 1885	Aston Villa	v	Wolverhampton Wanderers	Wellington Road
Note:

10 October 1885	Aston Villa	v	Derby County	Wellington Road
Note:

17 October 1885	Aston Villa	v	Bolton Wanderers	Wellington Road
Note:

24 October 1885	Nottingham Forest	v	Aston Villa
Note:

26 October 1885	Sheffield Wednesday	v	Aston Villa
Note:

31 October 1885	Aston Villa	v	Oxford University	Wellington Road
Note: It was a bad day all round for Villa vice-president William McGregor; he lost his watch when his pocket was picked in the match-day crush on the Perry Barr tram.

7 November 1885	Aston Villa	v	Gloucester County	Wellington Road
Note:

14 November 1885	Blackburn Olympic	v	Aston Villa
Note:

21 November 1885	Aston Villa	v	Queens Park	Wellington Road
Note:

23 November 1885	Oxford University	v	Aston Villa
Note:

28 November 1885	Aston Villa	v	West Bromwich Albion	Wellington Road
Note:

14 December 1885	Aston Villa	3–2	Cambridge University	Wellington Road
Note: 2,000 spectators

19 December 1885	Aston Villa	1–3	Blackburn Rovers	Wellington Road
Note: The original 5 December fixture was postponed due to a Rovers cup-tie.

26 December 1885	Aston Villa	13–0	Acton	Wellington Road
Note: 5,000 attendance

1 January 1886	Queens Park	v	Aston Villa
Note:

9 January 1886	Aston Villa	v	Accrington	Wellington Road
Note:

23 January 1886	Wolverhampton Wanderers	v	Aston Villa
Note:

30 January 1886	Aston Villa	v	Battlefield	Wellington Road
Note:

6 February 1886	West Bromwich Albion	v	Aston Villa
Note:

8 February 1886	Aston Villa	v	Edinburgh University	Wellington Road
Note:

20 February 1886	Aston Villa	v	Nottingham Forest	Wellington Road
Note:

27 February 1886	Aston Villa	v	Sheffield Wednesday	Wellington Road
Note:

6 March 1886	Derby County	v	Aston Villa
Note:

27 March 1886	Accrington	v	Aston Villa
