= Aston Shakespeare F.C. =

Aston Shakespeare
- Full name: Aston Shakespeare Football Club
- Nicknames: the Bards, the Astonites, the Shakespearians
- Founded: 1879
- Dissolved: 1890
- Ground: Aston Cross
- Secretary: G. Easthope
Home colours

Aston Shakespeare Football Club was an English football club from Aston, then in Warwickshire, England.

== History ==
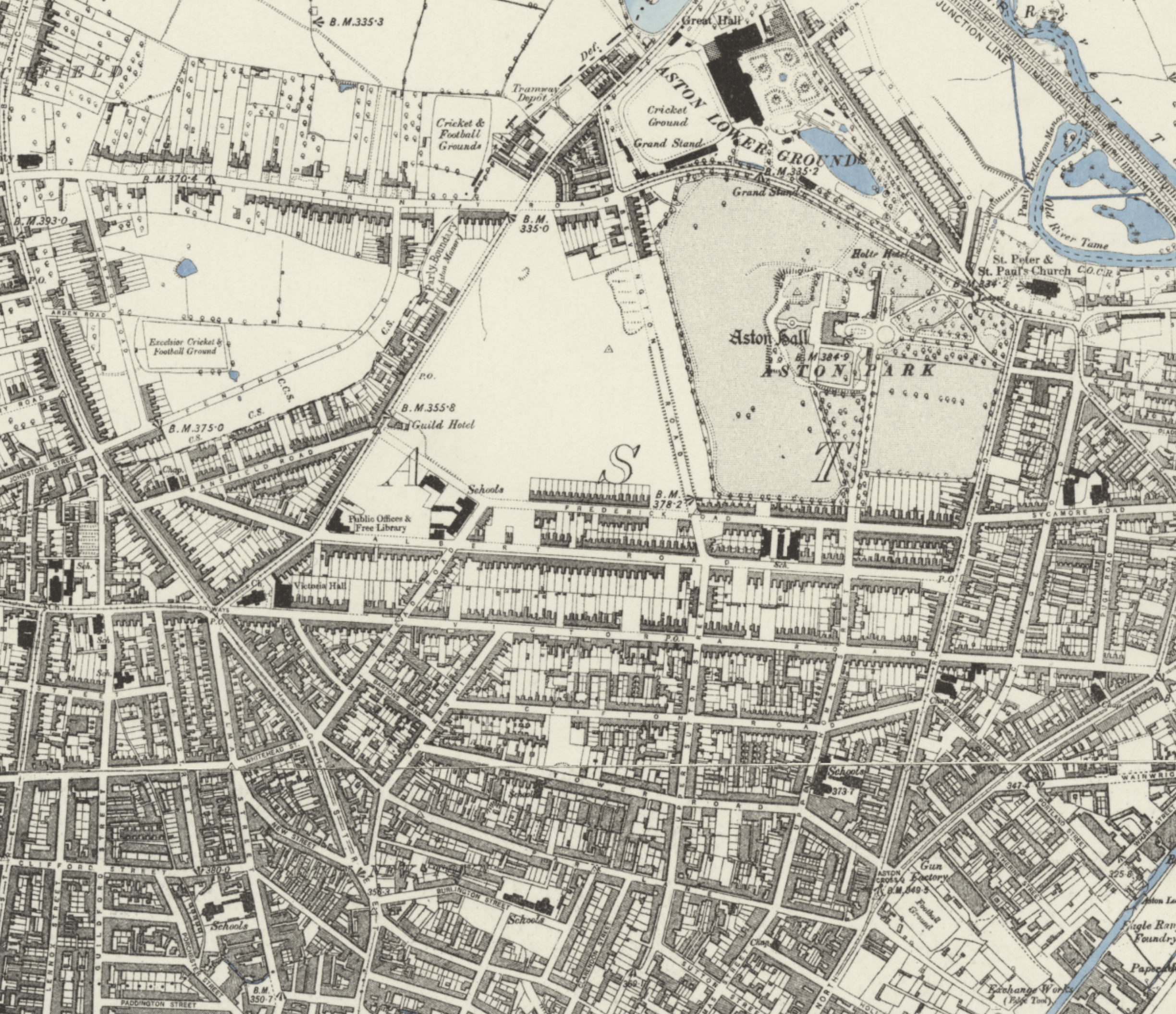
1889 map showing the locations of four of the football clubs in Aston: Excelsior's Fentham Road (left), Aston Unity's Trinity Road (top middle), Birmingham C&FC's Aston Lower Grounds (top right), Aston Shakespeare's Aston Cross (bottom right).

The club seems to have taken its name from the Shakespeare Inn in nearby Park Lane; the name was sometimes rendered as Aston Shakspeare. Shakespeare's first recorded match is a 2–1 defeat at Aston Victoria in 1879. The Garvey family was prominent in the club; Fred Garvey was secretary of the associated cricket club, Thomas and William both played for the club from its origin, and Bat Garvey played for the club as a 14 year old in 1879, and again in the 1880s.

There were rumours that the club had broken up in 1883, but it had been an early victim of identity theft, as the break-up reports related to "some of those boys that play on some waste ground near Aston Park [who] call themselves the Shakespeare". The Astonians first entered the Birmingham Senior Cup in 1884–85, beating Asbury 7–1 at home in the first round, but losing 9–1, again at home, to Walsall Town in the second.

=== Brief prominence ===
1887–88 proved to be the club's high water mark in competitions. For the only time in its history, the club played in the main rounds of the FA Cup, having had an entry for the 1886–87 competition refused after it was posted too late. In the first round, the club was drawn to play Burton Wanderers, but a sign of the club's difficulties was shown by the crowd being a mere 1,500; at the same stage, 2,000 were at Small Heath, 3,000 at Oldbury Town, and nearly 5,000 at Walsall Town. The Shakespearians were two goals to the good at half-time, but lost 3–2 thanks to two late goals.

However, following a protest, the Football Association ordered the match to be replayed; the FA upheld 16 separate protests at the same stage over the eligibility of players. Rather than return to Aston Cross, the Wanderers scratched from the competition, and played a more lucrative friendly against Derby St Luke's instead. The Bards therefore arranged a friendly with Sutton Coldfield, which was a typically "rough" Shakespeare game. In the second round, the club was drawn away at Wolverhampton Wanderers, and despite the Wolves being reduced to 10 men for the second half, Shakespeare went out by three goals to nil.

The club also had its best run in the Birmingham Senior Cup that season, reaching the third round (last 16), where it lost 3–0 at West Bromwich Albion. In the Dudley Charity Cup, the club recorded a remarkable 4–1 win over Walsall Town in the second round, the Garvey brothers ("Bat" and William) scoring three of the goals; the result was considered instrumental in driving Town to merge with Walsall Swifts. In the third round, Shakespeare lost 4–1 at Great Bridge Unity.

At the end of 1887, the club gained its only honour, beating Bloxwich Strollers 3–1 in the final of the Jubilee Cup - a competition for Junior clubs in the Midlands, to celebrate the golden anniversary of the reign of Queen Victoria - at Aston Cross.

=== Decline ===
The club's problem was similar to that of other clubs in the area, namely, the dominance of local professional clubs, in particular Aston Villa. Once the Football League was started, member clubs could pay more, and Shakespeare constantly had "emissaries of big clubs buzzing around them". The club had also never been able to capture the popular imagination, only 300 attending a match against Willenhall Pickwick just before the FA Cup tie with Burton.

At the end of the 1887–88 season, the club "lost three or four of their best men" and were said to be "going down hill fast". In 1888–89, the club gained its only FA Cup win in the first qualifying round, surprising Great Bridge Unity 1–0 away, but lost in the second qualifying round to Warwick County, with the club being criticized for rough play. In the Birmingham Senior Cup the Bards went out at the third stage to Shrewsbury Town; unlike the previous season, the club had to rely on a bye to get so far.

The club had at least enough notability to be considered for inclusion in merit tables produced by newspapers, but the Staffordshire Sentinel had the club bottom, with a goal average of 0.64 from 31 matches. In January 1889 it was enrolled as one of the 16 founder members of the short-lived Warwickshire Football Association.

The final match of any importance played by the club was the semi-final of the Warwickshire Cup in 1888–89, a 6–0 defeat to Small Heath, although the Bards at least had had some revenge over Warwick County in the competition, with a 5–0 win in the second round. At the close of the season, two more players had been "poached" by Villa, and although the club limped on into 1889–90, a typical result was an 8–1 thrashing by the unheralded Aston Templars in November. The last recorded result for the club is a 6–4 win over Aston Falcon on 30 November 1889, and although it arranged a fixture against the obscure Hearts of Oak in January 1890, there is no evidence the match was played.

== Colours ==
The club gave its colours as blue and white.

== Grounds ==
The club's earliest recorded ground was at Chenston Road, before moving to Aston Cross in around 1883; the club's pitch was at a ground built by Edwin Samson Moore, who had set up the Midland Vinegar Company in 1874, and later bought the rights to HP Sauce, for staff sports. In the mid-1880s it briefly played at Thimblemill Lane, on fields owned by John Wright. By 1887 the club was back at Aston Cross.

== Notable players ==
- Henry Dyoss, later joined Walsall Swifts
- "Bat" Garvey, Aston Villa player in 1888

== Honours ==
- FA Cup
  - Best season: 2nd round, 1887–88
- Birmingham Senior Cup
  - Best season: 3rd round (final 16), 1887–88
- Warwickshire Senior Cup
  - Best season: semi-final, 1888–89
