= Albert Brown (footballer, born 1862) =

English footballer (1865–1923)

Personal information
- Full name: Albert Brown
- Date of birth: 6 January 1865
- Place of birth: Coventry, England
- Date of death: 1930 (aged 67–68)
- Position: Forward

Senior career*
Years	Team	Apps	(Gls)
- Mitchell St George's
1887–1893	Aston Villa	86	(35)
- * Club domestic league appearances and goals

Albert Alfred Brown (7 January 1862 – 1930), was a British footballer in the early years of English professional football, who played for Aston Villa from 1884 until 1894.

He and his brother Alfred played in the same forward line during the 1884–1885 and 1885–1886 seasons. Brown was in the Villa team which won the FA Cup in 1887, beating local rivals West Bromwich Albion in the final. Before playing for Villa he played for Mitchell St George's.

== Season 1888–89 ==
He was one of the 11 players who played in Aston Villa' opening League game. He played on the right wing at Dudley Road, Wolverhampton, then home of Wolverhampton Wanderers, known as the "Wolves". The match was drawn 1–1. Aston Villa and Wolves were great rivals that season with Villa finishing 2nd and Wolves 3rd and only 3 points separated the 2 teams. Brown' debut League goal was on 15 September 1888 at Wellington Road, in a 5–1 win over Stoke. He was one of three players to play in every match for Villa that season, 22 League games and 3 FA Cup ties. As a winger Albert Brown played in a midfield that achieved a big (three-or-more-League-goals) win on four occasions. He scored 7 League goals and 1 in the FA Cup. He also scored 2 in a match against Accrington at Wellington Road, Birmingham, the then home of Aston Villa. Aston Villa won 4–2.

Brown retired from the game because of injury.

His brother Arthur Alfred Brown also played for Villa and made three appearances for England.

== Statistics ==
Club	Season	Division	League		FA Cup		Total	
Club	Season	Division	Apps	Goals	Apps	Goals	Apps	Goals
Aston Villa	1884-85				4	1	4	1
Aston Villa	1885-86				2	1	2	1
Aston Villa	1886-87				10	15	10	15
Aston Villa	1887-88				4	4	4	4
Aston Villa	1888–89	The Football League	22	7	3	1	25	8
Aston Villa	1889–90	Football League	22	7	2	0	24	7
Aston Villa	1890–91	Football League	16	11	2	2	18	13
Aston Villa	1892–93	First Division	20	10	1	0	21	10
Aston Villa	1893–94	First Division	6	2	0	0	6	2
Total			86	37	32	24	118	61
