= Archie Goodall =

Irish footballer (1865–1929)

Personal information
- Full name: Archibald Lee Goodall
- Date of birth: 3 January 1865
- Place of birth: Belfast, Ireland
- Date of death: 20 November 1929 (aged 64)
- Place of death: East Finchley, England
- Positions: Half back; forward

Senior career*
Years	Team	Apps	(Gls)
1885–1886	Liverpool Stanley		
1886	Preston North End		
1886–1887	Liverpool Stanley		
1887	St Jude's		
1887	Derby County		
1887–1888	Bolton Wanderers		
1888	Preston North End	2	(1)
1888–1889	Aston Villa	14	(7)
1889–1903	Derby County	380	(48)
1903	Plymouth Argyle		
1903–1905	Glossop	26	(13)
1905–1906	Wolverhampton Wanderers	7	(0)
Total		429	(69)

International career
1899–1904	Ireland	10	(2)

Managerial career
- 1904–1905: Glossop
- * Club domestic league appearances and goals

Archibald Lee Goodall (3 January 1865 – 20 November 1929) was an Irish footballer who made 429 appearances in the Football League for Preston North End, Aston Villa, Derby County, Glossop and Wolverhampton Wanderers. He won 10 caps at full international level for Ireland. Goodall could play in the centre half and forward positions.

Goodall made 424 appearances and scored 52 goals (Football League & FA Cup) for Derby County. He also served as club captain and established a club record for consecutive league appearances. Goodall was employed regularly as a centre half and made great use of the shoulder charge. His stamina and shear physical presence also made him very effective in this position.

During his career Goodall also set three age records. He was the oldest player to score an international goal during the 19th century, the oldest player to score for Ireland and is the oldest player ever to play for Wolves. Goodall also proved to be a controversial character. In 1894 he refused to play an extra half-hour of the United Counties League Cup final against West Bromwich Albion because he said his contract ended after 90 minutes and in 1898 he tried to off-load his extra FA Cup final tickets to a ticket tout.

Goodall's older brother, John Goodall, was also a notable footballer and played for Preston North End, Derby County and England. Despite having Scottish parents and being raised in Kilmarnock, the Goodall brothers were ineligible to play for Scotland because of their birthplaces. As a result, they played for their countries of birth and thus became the first brothers in world football to play for different national teams.

== Early years ==
Goodall's parents were Richard Goodall and Mary Lees who were married on 31 December 1860 in Tarbolton, Ayrshire, Scotland.

Goodall's father was a soldier in the British Army and was stationed in London where John Goodall was born in 1863. Within the following year he was posted to Belfast where Archie was born in 1865. The family eventually settled in Kilmarnock, where the brothers spent the majority of their childhoods. As a youth, Archie played for several clubs in the North-West of England and Derby County, including Everton.

== Preston North End & Aston Villa ==
In 1888 he joined his brother at Preston North End. Archie Goodall, playing at inside – forward, made his League debut on 15 September 1888, at Dudley Road, the then home of Wolverhampton Wanderers. Preston North End defeated the home team 4 – 0 and Archie Goodall scored the third of Preston North End' four goals. Archie was as rumbustious, as his brother John was gentle and he only stayed at Preston North End until 30 September 1888. Archie Goodall appeared in two of the four League matches played by Preston North End in September 1888 and he scored one League goal. As a forward (two appearances) he played in a front-line that scored three–League–goals–or–more twice. On 1 October 1888 Archie Goodall signed for Aston Villa.

Archie Goodall' move from Preston North End was the first transfer during a season to be approved by the Football League. Archie Goodall, playing at centre – half, made his Aston Villa debut on 13 October 1888, at Wellington Road, the then home of Aston Villa. Aston Villa defeated the visitors, Blackburn Rovers, 6 – 1 and Archie Goodall scored the second of Aston Villa' six goals. Archie Goodall appeared in 14 of the 18 League matches played by Aston Villa from when Goodall joined the club and he scored seven League goals. Goodall played in defence, midfield and the forward–line for Aston Villa. Playing as a full–back/centre–half (four appearances) he was part of a defence-line that kept the opposition to one–League–goal–in–a–match once. Playing as a wing–half (five appearances) he was part of a midfield that achieved a big (three-League-goals-or-more) win once. As a forward (five appearances) he played in a front-line that scored three–League–goals–or–more on three separate occasions. Goodall' seven League goals for Aston Villa including two–League–goals–in–a–match twice. Goodall scored both Villa goals against Wolverhampton Wanderers in a 2 – 1 win at Wellington Road on 24 November 1888. On 8 December 1888 Goodall scored the second and fourth goals as Villa defeated Notts County 4 – 2 at Trent Bridge, the then home of Notts County. In May 1889 Archie Goodall signed for Derby County.

== Derby County ==
In May 1889 Goodall joined Derby County where he was reunited with his brother John. Together with Steve Bloomer, the Goodall brothers formed the backbone of a County side that regularly challenged for top honours over the following decade. Primarily used as a centre-half at County, Goodall made 380 English League appearances for the club, scored 48 league goals and helped them finish runners-up in 1896. Between October 1892 and October 1897 he also made a club record 151 consecutive league appearances.

Goodall also played a further 42 games and scored 4 goals in the FA Cup, helping County reach three FA Cup Finals in 1898, 1899 and 1903. In 1898 before the final against Nottingham Forest he was caught trying to off-load his Cup final tickets to a ticket tout. Despite being strong favourites County eventually lost 3–1. He missed the 1899 final due to injury and in 1903 they lost 6–0 to Bury.

== Irish International ==
Goodall had to wait for the Irish FA to change its rules governing the selection of non-resident players before he made his international debut for Ireland on 4 March 1899 as they beat Wales 1–0 in Belfast. He thus became one of the first four Irish players based in England to be selected to represent Ireland. Three weeks later, on 25 March, aged 34 years and 279 days, Goodall became the oldest player to score in international football during the 19th century when he scored Ireland's goal in a 9–1 defeat to Scotland in Glasgow.

Goodall remained a regular at centre-half for Ireland until he was almost 40. On 28 March 1903 he scored the opening goal in a 2–0 win against Wales, helping Ireland clinch a share in the 1903 British Home Championship. The goal also saw Goodall, aged 38 years and 283 days, become the oldest goalscorer in Ireland's history. He made his final appearance for Ireland as a centre-forward in a 1–0 win against Wales on 21 March 1904. His teammates while playing for Ireland included Jack Kirwan, Billy Scott, Billy McCracken and Robert Milne,

== Later years ==
After leaving Derby County in May 1903 Goodall briefly joined Plymouth Argyle before becoming player-manager at Glossop North End in January 1904. Among his teammates at Glossop was the former England international Fred Spiksley. Goodall made his last two appearances for Ireland while at Glossop. In October 1905 he joined Wolverhampton Wanderers. He was 41 years and 153 days old when he made his final league appearance for Wolves on 2 December 1905 against Everton, making him the oldest player ever to play for that club. After retiring as a player, Goodall travelled Europe and the United States as part of a strongman act before settling in London, where he lived out his remaining years.

== Honours ==
Derby County

- FA Cup:
  - Runner-up 1898, 1903
- English League
  - Runner-up 1895–96

Ireland

- British Home Championship:
  - Shared title 1903

== Legacy ==
On the 16 January 2024, Derby County fan Kalwinder Singh Dhindsa created a Go Fund Me Page to collect funds for a new headstone for Archie Goodall at Nottingham Road Cemetery, Derby. The target was reached within two weeks and the new headstone was put down in April 2024.

== Sources ==
- Who's Who of Aston Villa (2004): Tony Matthews

Birth
