= Albert Allen =

English footballer

Personal information
- Full name: Albert Arthur Allen
- Date of birth: 1 April 1867
- Place of birth: Aston, Birmingham, England
- Date of death: 13 October 1899 (aged 32)
- Place of death: Birmingham, England
- Position: Inside forward

Youth career
- St. Phillips
- 1884–1887: Aston Villa

Senior career*
Years	Team	Apps	(Gls)
1887–1891	Aston Villa	44	(27)
Total		44	(27)

International career
1888	England	1	(3)
- * Club domestic league appearances and goals

Albert Allen (1 April 1867 – 13 October 1899) was a football player in the early years of professional football in England, who played as an inside-forward with Aston Villa. He was Villa's first England international making one appearance for England on 7 April 1888 when he scored three goals in a 5–1 victory over Ireland, thus making him one of the five England players who scored a hat trick on his only international appearance.

== Season 1888-89 ==
He first joined Villa in August 1884 (before the foundation of the Football League), played in the first Villa League team to debut at Dudley Road, Wolverhampton, then home of Wolverhampton Wanderer's. The match ended 1-1. He scored Villa's first Football League hat-trick in a 9–1 home win over Notts County on 29 September 1888, his debut League goal was on 15 September 1888 at Wellington Road, in a 5–1 win over Stoke. When he made his League debut he was 21 years 146 days old; that made him, on that first day of League football, Aston Villa's youngest league player. Allen only missed one League match, out of 22, and top-scored in 1888–1889 with 18 League goals and 1 in the FA Cup. Played as a forward in a forward line that scored three-League-goals-or-more-in-a-match on six separate occasions. Developed an understanding with Dennis Hodgetts.

In the second League season (1889–90) Allen scored eight League goals from 19 League Appearances. Allen scored a second League hat-trick in a 6–2 win at Turf Moor, the home of Burnley, on 5 October 1889. Allen was joint club top-scorer with Billy Dickson and Dennis (Denny) Hodgetts. Aston Villa had a poor season and finished 8th (out of 12).

In 1890–91, another poor season for Aston Villa, finishing 9th in the League, Allen only played four matches scoring once.

He made 44 league appearances for Aston Villa, scoring 27 goals. He died of tuberculosis, which had ended his career prematurely, aged 32.

A light, but most effective wing player, with a good turn of speed. Lack of weight and size did not affect his pluck. Dribbled like an artist and shot with force and good aim. Always did well in big games and was seen to special advantage in his international. A modest, unassuming player, whom it was a pleasure to meet.

== Statistics ==
Club	Season	Division	League		FA Cup		Total	
Club	Season	Division	Apps	Goals	Apps	Goals	Apps	Goals
Aston Villa	1888–89	The Football League	21	18	3	1	24	19
Aston Villa	1889–90	Football League	19	8	2	1	21	9
Aston Villa	1890–91	Football League	4	1	-	-	4	1
