= Arthur Dixon (footballer, born 1867) =

English footballer

Personal information
- Full name: Arthur Albert Dixon
- Date of birth: July 1867
- Place of birth: Matlock, England
- Date of death: 1933 (aged 66)
- Position: Right half

Senior career*
Years	Team	Apps	(Gls)
1886–1888	Derby Midland		
1888–1889	Aston Villa	3	(1)
1889–1890	Stoke	0	(0)
- * Club domestic league appearances and goals

Arthur Albert Dixon (July 1867 – 1933) was a footballer who played in the Football League for Aston Villa and Stoke.

== Career ==
Dixon was born in Matlock and played for Derby Midland before joining Aston Villa in August 1888. Dixon made his debut on 15 September 1888 at Wellington Road, at wing-half, in a match against Stoke which Aston Villa won 5–1. He was knocked out during the Stoke game but was fit to play the remaining 2 League games played in September 1888.

He was released at the end of the 1888–89 season and joined Stoke but he failed to make an appearance under Harry Lockett.

== Career statistics ==
Club	Season	League			FA Cup		Total	
Club	Season	Division	Apps	Goals	Apps	Goals	Apps	Goals
Aston Villa	1888–89	Football League	3	1	0	0	3	1
Stoke	1889–90	Football League	0	0	0	0	0	0
Career Total			3	1	0	0	3	1
