= Walter Ashmore =

English footballer (1861–1940)

Personal information
- Full name: Walter William Ashmore
- Date of birth: October – December 1861
- Place of birth: Smethwick, England
- Date of death: 1940 (aged 78–79)
- Position: Goalkeeper

Senior career*
Years	Team	Apps	(Gls)
1886-1888	West Bromwich Standard F.C.		
1888–1889	Aston Villa	1	(0)
- Aston Unity F.C.
- * Club domestic league appearances and goals

Walter Ashmore (1861–1940) was an English footballer who played in the Football League for Aston Villa.

Born between 1 October 1861 and 31 December 1861, Walter Ashmore first came to prominence in the West Midlands when he signed for West Bromwich Standard FC in 1886. (Note: One source states he signed for West Bromwich Standard F.C. in 1887) He spent a couple of seasons with Standard and then moved to Aston Villa as a reserve goalkeeper for Jimmy Warner.

== Career ==
Walter Ashmore, playing in goal, made his League debut on 22 September 1888, at Wellington Road the then home of Aston Villa. The visitors were Everton and the home team won the match 2–1. Walter Ashmore appeared in one of the 22 League matches played by Aston Villa during the 1888–89 season. As a goalkeeper (one appearance) he played in a defence-line that restricted the opposition to one-League-goal-in-a-match once. The appearance against Everton was Ashmore' only League Appearance.

Ashmore left Villa in 1889 and joined Aston Unity, to play football. However, one source states that Walter Ashmore played cricket for Unity. Aston Unity was and still is a cricket Club in 2018.
