= Bill Paddock =

English footballer

Personal information
- Full name: William Paddock
- Date of birth: 6 February 1862
- Place of birth: West Bromwich, England
- Date of death: April 1938 (aged 76)
- Place of death: West Bromwich, England
- Position: Winger

Senior career*
Years	Team	Apps	(Gls)
–1886	West Bromwich Unity		
1886–88	West Bromwich Albion		
- * Club domestic league appearances and goals

Bill Paddock (6 February 1862 – April 1938) was an English footballer who played as a winger and inside-left for West Bromwich Albion in the 1880s.

== Career ==
Paddock was born in West Bromwich and played for Christ Church School and West Bromwich Unity before joining West Bromwich Albion in 1886. His first competitive game for the club was in the first round of the 1886–87 FA Cup, a 6–0 win over Burton Wanderers in which he scored one of the goals. He was quickly reckoned to be a "valuable man in the left wing of the Albion; he quick and sure, and he is splendid shot for goal."

He was a regular in the side up to and including the 1887 FA Cup Final, in which he picked up a runners-up medal. It was one of three finals in which he appeared in the 1886–87 season; he scored in Albion's 4–0 win over Walsall Swifts in the final of the Staffordshire Senior Cup (the week after the FA Cup final), but was on the losing side against Long Eaton Rangers in the Birmingham Senior Cup.

Paddock was forced to retire from the game because of a knee injury after the 1887–88 season; although named as one of the club's registered professionals at the start of the season, he did not featured in any of the club's competitive matches.

== Family ==
Bill's brother Jack was a player and trainer for West Bromwich Albion, and Jack's son John later played for the club.
