= Gershom Cox =

English footballer

Personal information
- Date of birth: 28 September 1863
- Place of birth: Birmingham, England
- Date of death: October 4 1918 (aged 54)
- Place of death: Gravesend, England
- Position: Defender

Senior career*
Years	Team	Apps	(Gls)
1886–1887	Birmingham Excelsior		
1887	Walsall Town		
1887–1892	Aston Villa	86	(0)
1893–1895	Willenhall Pickwick		
1895–1898	Walsall Brunswick		
1898–1900	Bloxwich Strollers		
- * Club domestic league appearances and goals

Gershom Cox (28 September 1863 – October–December 1918) was an English professional footballer who played as a full-back for Aston Villa from 1887 to 1893.

== Early career ==
Gershom Cox was first signed for Birmingham Excelsior in 1886. The club were not a League team but took part in the FA Cup from 1883 to 1888. Cox was on the books for one season signing for Walsall Town in 1887 for a trial. It's not recorded how long the trial took but, in August 1887 Cox signed for Aston Villa. According to one source Gershom Cox was described as a well-built, versatile defender.

== Who scored the first league goal? ==
Until a chance discovery in 2013, his main claim to fame had been that he scored the first goal in The Football League 31 minutes after kick-off on the first day of the inaugural season, 1888-89 on 8 September 1888 for Aston Villa against their Midlands rivals Wolverhampton Wanderers. However, The Midland Evening News of 7 September 1888 included an advert showing "kick-off 3.30 prompt". Cox's goal was scored into his own net, so is the first recorded "own goal" in the Football league.

As of 2013, Kenny Davenport is regarded as scorer of the first ever Football League goal, scoring for Bolton Wanderers at 3:47pm on 7 September 1888 against Derby County.

== Season 1888-89 ==
Gershom Cox, playing as a full–back, made his League debut on 8 September 1888 at Dudley Road, the then home of Wolverhampton Wanderers. The match ending in a 1–1 draw, Cox scoring an own–goal (see above). Gershom Cox appeared in all of the 22 League matches played by Aston Villa in season 1888–89. Gershom Cox, playing at full–back (22 appearances), was part of the Aston Villa defence that achieved one League clean–sheet and kept the opposition to one–League–goal–in–a–match on no less than nine occasions. Cox also played in all three FA Cup ties at full–back.

Cox won an FA Cup runners–up medal, appearing for Aston Villa in the 1892 final. Villa lost to West Bromwich Albion. He made 101 first–team appearances for Aston Villa (86 in the Football League) in all competitions. After his years at Aston Villa he played for Willenhall Pickwick from June 1893 to August 1895, then played for Walsall Brunswick from August 1895 to May 1898 and then, finally, he played for Bloxwich Strollers from May 1898 to May 1900 when he retired from playing. He broke his leg in season 1899–1900 which caused his retirement. Gershom Cox was, for a while a successful market trader, then he joined the Birmingham City Police Force then he left Birmingham to hold a brief appointment as coach for Kent League club Gravesend United.

== Honours ==
Aston Villa

- FA Cup runners-up: 1892

== Statistics ==
Club	Season	Division	League		FA Cup		Total	
Club	Season	Division	Apps	Goals	Apps	Goals	Apps	Goals
Aston Villa	1888–89	The Football League	22	0	3	0	25	0
Aston Villa	1889–90	Football League	17	0	2	0	19	0
Aston Villa	1890–91	Football League	20	0	2	0	22	0
Aston Villa	1891–92	Football League	17	0	3	0	20	0
Aston Villa	1892–93	First Division	10	0	1	0	11	0
