= George Holden (footballer, born 1859) =

English footballer

George Henry Holden (6 October 1859 – 1920s) was a footballer who, playing as an outside-right, made four appearances for England in the 1880s.

== Football career ==
Holden was born in West Bromwich and attended St. John's School in Wednesbury. He began his football career with Old Park F.C. in Wednesbury in 1876 and then joined Wednesbury St. James F.C. in 1877. From there he joined Wednesbury Old Athletic in 1878. Holden established a reputation for being an extremely fast winger with exceptional dribbling skills.

During his first spell with Wednesbury Old Athletic, he won four international caps. He made his international debut for England on 12 March 1881 against Scotland. England went down to a "humiliating" 6–1 defeat.

His next appearances came three years later in 1884, when he played in all three matches in the inaugural British Home Championship. England's opening match was against Ireland at Ballynafeigh Park, Belfast on 26 January 1884. England "won the match with ease" 8–1, with Henry Cursham scoring a hat-trick on his final England appearance, with the remaining goals coming from Edward Johnson (2), Charles Bambridge (2) and his brother Arthur. In a close match against Scotland at Cathkin Park on 15 March, the Scots won 1–0. Despite this defeat, Holden retained his place for the final match of the tournament against Wales on 17 March, which England won comfortably 4–0, including two goals from William Bromley-Davenport. Scotland's victory over England enabled them to claim the Home Championship, which they were to dominate for the next few seasons.

Holden's performances for England attracted the attention of West Bromwich Albion, whom he joined in May 1886, staying for a single season. Although Holden appeared in the early rounds of the FA Cup, including scoring in the First Round 6–0 victory over Burton Wanderers, he was no longer part of the side when Albion reached the Cup Final where they were to lose 2–0 to Aston Villa.

He rejoined Wednesbury Old Athletic for a final time between 1887 and 1888, before finishing his career with Derby Midland in 1888; he also represented Birmingham and Staffordshire FAs.

Holden died in the 1920s.
