= Jimmy Warner =

English footballer (1865–1943)

Personal information
- Full name: James Warner
- Date of birth: 15 April 1865
- Place of birth: Lozells, Birmingham, England
- Date of death: 7 November 1943 (aged 78)
- Place of death: Pittsburgh, United States
- Position: Goalkeeper

Youth career
- Milton

Senior career*
Years	Team	Apps	(Gls)
1886–1892	Aston Villa	75	(0)
1892–1893	Newton Heath	22	(0)
1893–1894	Walsall Town Swifts	12	(0)
- * Club domestic league appearances and goals

James Warner (15 April 1865 – 7 November 1943) (Note: One source states Warner was born on 25 August 1863.) was an English footballer who played as a goalkeeper for Aston Villa and Newton Heath in the late 19th century. He helped Aston Villa win the FA Cup in 1887.

== Career ==
=== Aston Villa ===
Born in Lozells, Birmingham, Warner began his football career with Milton F.C., before moving to Aston Villa in May 1886. He played for Aston Villa for six years, making a total of 101 appearances in all competitions. In 1887, he was a member of the Villa side which defeated Rangers 3–1 in the FA Cup semi-final, to set up a final against local rivals West Bromwich Albion. In the final, played at Kennington Oval on 2 April 1887, Albion were the favourites having been (defeated) finalists the previous year, and also having defeated Preston North End in the semi-final. In the first twenty minutes of the final, the Villa defence was put under heavy pressure, but "Warner played a brave game in goal, repeatedly foiling Albion's attempts to charge him, ball in hand, over his own goal-line." Warner successfully prevented the Albion forwards from scoring, and in the second half Villa score twice with goals by Archie Hunter and Dennis Hodgetts, to win the cup for the first time.

On 8 September 1888, Villa made their first appearance in The Football League on the first day of the inaugural season, 1888–89. In the match against Wolverhampton Wanderers, Warner was in goal when defender Gershom Cox "had the misfortune of kicking the ball through his own goalposts".The final score was 1-1. Thus Cox scored and Warner conceded what was thought, until 2013, to be the first goal in the Football League.

Warner played 21 of the 22 League games Aston Villa played in the 1888–89 season. As a goalkeeper he played in a defence that achieved one League clean-sheet and kept the opposition to one-League-goal-in-a-match on no less than on eight occasions. In the first three league seasons, Warner was virtually ever-present, missing only two matches, with Villa gaining the runners-up spot in 1888–89. The following season, Villa were less successful finishing eighth in the table and were one of five clubs having to apply to be re-elected to the league. 1890–91 was similar, with Villa finishing ninth and again having to suffer "the indignation of the re-election process".

In 1891–92, injury restricted Warner to only eleven league appearances with Albert Hinchley replacing him. Warner was able to recover to appear in all five FA Cup matches, when Villa reached the final where they again met local rivals West Bromwich Albion. In the final, played at Kennington Oval on 19 March 1892, Warner and his colleagues in the Villa defence were no match for Billy Bassett and the Albion forwards who won the match comfortably 3–0, with goals from Jasper Geddes, Sammy Nicholls and Jack Reynolds.

Suspicions were immediately raised over Warner's performance in the Cup Final. In the weeks preceding the Final, Warner skipped training sessions with the rest of the Villa side, and was also seen in earnest conversation with a mysterious man in a sharp suit and hat. He fumbled Geddes long-range shot and allowed the ball into the back of the net for West Brom's first goal, while he fumbled a straightforward save twenty minutes later, allowing Nicholls to score. Then finally in the second half Reynolds long-range shot flew into the net past a hopelessly out-of-position Warner. Rumours began to circulate that Warner had lost a substantial amount of money on a bet and had agreed to throw the Cup Final to recoup his losses

Villa finished the 1891–92 in fourth place in the league, but Warner's Villa career was over and, in July 1892, he was transferred to Newton Heath in Manchester.

=== Newton Heath ===
He became Newton Heath's first choice goalkeeper straight away in their first season in the Football League and made 20 consecutive appearances at the start of the season. However, he failed to show up for an away match against Stoke City on 7 January 1893, resulting in centre-half Willie Stewart having to play as a makeshift goalkeeper; the team lost 7–1. Warner explained to the club directors that he had missed his train to Stoke, but they were unconvinced and suspended him for a month. After his suspension was up, Warner made just three more appearances for Newton Heath (two in the league and one in the Manchester Senior Cup), and was sold to Walsall Town Swifts at the end of the season.

=== Walsall Town Swifts ===
His career at Walsall was short-lived too, and he retired in 1894.

Warner died in Pittsburgh, United States, on 7 July 1943.

== Style of Play ==
One source described Warner as supple and shrewd, agile enough to reach (punch) the most difficult of shots (or headers).

== Honours ==
Aston Villa

- FA Cup: 1887

== Statistics ==
Appearances and goals by club, season and competition
Club	Season	League			FA Cup		Total	
Club	Season	Division	Apps	Goals	Apps	Goals	Apps	Goals
Aston Villa	1888–89	The Football League	21	0	3	0	24	0
Aston Villa	1889–90	Football League	21	0	2	0	23	0
Aston Villa	1890–91	Football League	22	0	2	0	24	0
Aston Villa	1891–92	Football League	11	0	5	0	16	0
Newton Heath	1892–93	First Division	22	0	-	-	22	0
Walsall Town Swifts	1893–94	Second Division	12	0	2	0	14	0
