= Bat Garvey =

English footballer

Personal information
- Full name: Bartholomew Walter Garvey
- Date of birth: 5 October 1865
- Place of birth: Rocky Lane, Aston, England
- Date of death: 18 February 1911, 260 Clifton Road, Aston Manor, Birmingham
- Position: Forward

Senior career*
Years	Team	Apps	(Gls)
1886-1887	Aston Hall Swifts		
1887-1888	Aston Shakespeare		
1888–1890	Aston Villa	7	(4)
- * Club domestic league appearances and goals

Bat Garvey (5 October 1865 – 18 February 1911) was an English footballer who played in The Football League for Aston Villa.

== Career ==
Bat Garvey signed for Aston Hall Swifts F.C. in 1886 and then for Aston Shakespeare in 1887.

=== Season 1888-89 ===
Garvey played in the debut Football League Aston Villa team at Dudley Road, Wolverhampton, then home of Wolverhampton Wanderers'. The match was played on 8 September 1888 and ended in a 1–1 draw. Garvey played at inside-left. Garvey only played one more match that season, the last game of the season when Villa got thrashed 2–5 at County Ground, Derby.

Batty scored a hat-trick in the 6–1 home league victory over Stoke City on 7 December 1889.

== Statistics ==
Appearances and goals by club, season and competition
Club	Season	League			FA Cup		Total	
Club	Season	Division	Apps	Goals	Apps	Goals	Apps	Goals
Aston Villa	1888–89	The Football League	2	0	-	-	2	0
Aston Villa	1889–90	Football League	5	4	-	-	5	4
