= Howard Vaughton =

English international footballer

Howard Vaughton appeared in the 1883 Birmingham Senior Cup final between Wednesbury Old Athletic and Villa

Oliver Howard Vaughton (9 January 1861 – 6 January 1937) was an England international footballer who played as an inside left.

Vaughton played for England on five occasions, scoring six goals. Five of his goals were scored in a 13–0 victory over Ireland in Belfast on 18 February 1882, with his Villa team-mate Arthur Brown contributing four.

The 26-year-old made his Villa debut in the 1887 FA Cup final on 2 April 1887

After his football career ended he ran a silversmith's firm, which was charged with making a new FA Cup after the original disappeared in mysterious circumstances in 1895.

The peoples favourite, and one of Archie Hunter's pet pupils. An adept at every form of indoor and outdoor sport, he dribbled like an angel, and shot like a demon. Not nearly so deadly as his comrade, Whateley, he scored his share of goals. Whatever he did he did well, and was neatness personified. Could scarcely be played in wrong position, and was saturated through and through with the Aston Villa spirit. Scored the only goal in the famous cup tie against Queens Park in Glasgow, in 1884. Made a famous wing in company with Eli Davis. A keen judge of most games, a thorough sportsman, he has enriched sport in many directions.

He died in Birmingham on 6 January 1937, three days before what would have been his 76th birthday.
