= John Burton (footballer, born 1863) =

English footballer

Personal information
- Full name: John Henry Burton
- Date of birth: 18 September 1863
- Place of birth: Birmingham, England
- Date of death: April 1914 (aged 50)
- Place of death: Birmingham, England
- Position: Wing-half

Senior career*
| Years | Team | Apps | (Gls) |
- Handsworth Victoria
- Aston Park Unity
| 1885–1893 | Aston Villa | 28 | (1) |
- * Club domestic league appearances and goals

John Henry Burton (18 September 1863 – April 1914) was an English professional footballer who played in the Football League for Aston Villa.

Burton was born in the Handsworth district of Birmingham. A wing–half, his first club was Handsworth Victoria. Little is recorded about this club. According to Wikipedia there is a Handsworth Park in Birmingham, originally called Victoria Park. Burton played one season 1883–84 for Handsworth Victoria. In 1884 he signed for Aston Unity. This club reached the Third Round of the FA Cup in season 1882–1883. Burton played for Unity during the 1884–1885 season. He signed for Aston Villa in April 1885. He played for Aston Villa from 1885 to 1893 when a knee injury forced his retirement. He played for the club in the 1887 FA Cup Final.

== Season 1888-89 ==
Jack Burton, playing as a wing–half, made his League debut on 6 October 1888 at Wellington Road, the then home of Aston Villa, in a match against Blackburn Rovers. The home team defeated the visitors 6–1. Jack Burton appeared in 16 of the 22 League matches played by Aston Villa in season 1888–89. Jack Burton, playing at wing–half (16 appearances), played in an Aston Villa midfield that achieved big (three–goals–or–more) wins on two occasions. He also played in all three FA Cup ties, at wing–half.

Described as strong as an ox and could kick a ball as hard as any other player. Before retiring he appeared in 28 League matches (16 in season 1888–89) and played five times in the FA Cup after the Football League was formed.

He died in Hockley, Birmingham, in 1914 at the age of 50.

== Statistics ==
Appearances and goals by club, season and competition
| Club | Season | League | | | FA Cup | | Total | |
| Club | Season | Division | Apps | Goals | Apps | Goals | Apps | Goals |
|---|---|---|---|---|---|---|---|---|
| Aston Villa | 1888–89 | The Football League | 16 | 0 | 3 | 0 | 19 | 0 |
| Aston Villa | 1889–90 | Football League | 10 | 0 | 2 | 0 | 10 | 0 |
| Aston Villa | 1890–91 | Football League | 2 | 1 | - | - | 4 | 1 |
