= 1890–91 Aston Villa F.C. season =

English football club season

Aston Villa
1890–91 season
- Manager: George Ramsay
- Ground: Wellington Road
- Football League: 9th
- FA Cup: Round 2
Home colours	Away colours

The Football League
- Season: 1890–91
- Champions: Everton; 1st English title
- Matches: 132
- Goals: 554 (4.2 per match)
- Top goalscorer: Jack Southworth (26 goals)
- Biggest home win: Derby County 9–0 Wolves (10 January 1891)
- Biggest away win: Blackburn 1–7 Notts County (14 March 1891)
- Highest scoring: Derby County 8–5 Blackburn (6 September 1890)
- Average attendance: 6,413

The 1890–91 English football season saw Aston Villa's 3rd season in the Football League disappoint expectations when a ninth-placed finish required re-election to the Football League. They also had a poor season in the F.A. Cup going out in the second round against Stoke. As consolation Aston Villa won the 1890 National League of Baseball of Great Britain.

Aston Villa, now known exclusively as a football club, won their only professional baseball championship in 1890. The competition was hindered by poor weather and disappointing crowds and made a loss for its investors. Aston Villa's win was not without controversy, however, with both Aston Villa and Preston North End being found guilty of cheating during the season. For much of the season Derby Baseball Club did lead the championship, however, pressure from other teams in the league over the number of American players on the Derby team and low attendances led to Derby being expelled before the end of the season, though at the time the club insisted they had ‘retired’ as champions, despite evidence to the contrary.

There were debuts for Walter Evans, Fred Marshall, Tom McKnight, Charles Harley, George Campbell, James Brown and Charlie Athersmith.

As late as 1901, in the warm weather months, Villa would forgo their heavier woollen club colours in favour of thin cotton red shirts.

== League ==
Pos	Team	Pld	W	D	L	GF	GA	GAv	Pts	Qualification
7	Sunderland	22	10	5	7	51	31	1.645	23 (Note: Sunderland were deducted two points for fielding an unregistered player.)	
8	Burnley	22	9	3	10	52	63	0.825	21	
9	Aston Villa	22	7	4	11	45	58	0.776	18	Re-elected
10	Accrington	22	6	4	12	28	50	0.560	16	Re-elected
11	Derby County	22	7	1	14	47	81	0.580	15	Re-elected

=== Matches ===
The table below lists all the results of Aston Villa in the Football League for the 1890–91 season

6 September 1890	Wolverhampton Wanderers	2–1	Aston Villa	Molineux
		Report	Albert Brown

13 September 1890	Aston Villa	3–2	Notts County	Wellington Road
	Albert Brown; Tom McKnight; Jack Graham	Report

20 September 1890	Burnley	2–1	Aston Villa	Turf Moor
		Report	Tom McKnight

27 September 1890	Aston Villa	0–4	West Bromwich Albion	Wellington Road
		Report

4 October 1890	Bolton Wanderers	4–0	Aston Villa	Pike's Lane
		Report

11 October 1890	Aston Villa	2–2	Everton	Wellington Road
	Daniel Paton; Jimmy Cowan	Report

18 October 1890	Derby County	5–4	Aston Villa	Racecourse Ground
		Report	Dennis Hodgetts; Jimmy Cowan

25 October 1890	Aston Villa	4–0	Derby County	Wellington Road
	Billy Dickson; Jimmy Cowan; Albert Brown; Dennis Hodgetts	Report

1 November 1890	West Bromwich Albion	0–3	Aston Villa	Stoney Lane
		Report	Albert Brown; Billy Dickson

8 November 1890	Aston Villa	4–4	Burnley	Wellington Road
	Billy Dickson; Jimmy Cowan; Albert Brown; Jack Graham	Report

15 November 1890	Aston Villa	3–1	Accrington	Wellington Road
	Jack Graham; Dennis Hodgetts; Albert Brown	Report

22 November 1890	Aston Villa	5–0	Bolton Wanderers	Wellington Road
	Albert Brown (2); James Brown; George Campbell; Billy Dickson	Report

29 November 1890	Notts County	7–1	Aston Villa	Trent Bridge
		Report	Billy Dickson

6 December 1890	Blackburn Rovers	5–1	Aston Villa	Ewood Park
		Report	Billy Dickson

13 December 1890	Aston Villa	2–2	Blackburn Rovers	Wellington Road
	Albert Allen; Albert Brown	Report

26 December 1890	Aston Villa	0–0	Sunderland	Wellington Road
		Report

1 January 1891	Everton	5–0	Aston Villa	Anfield
		Report

10 January 1891	Sunderland	5–1	Aston Villa	Newcastle Road
		Report	Jack Graham

24 January 1891	Preston North End	4–1	Aston Villa	Deepdale
		Report	Albert Brown

9 March 1891	Aston Villa	0–1	Preston North End	Wellington Road
		Report

14 March 1891	Aston Villa	6–2	Wolverhampton Wanderers	Wellington Road
	Tom McKnight; Billy Dickson; Charlie Athersmith	Report

21 March 1891	Accrington	1–3	Aston Villa	Thorneyholme Road
		Report	Jack Burton; Billy Dickson

Source: avfchistory.co.uk

== FA Cup ==
- 1st Round, 17 January 1891, London Casuals, Home, Won 13–1
- 2nd Round, 31 January 1891, Stoke, Away, Lost 0–3
