= Thomas Harrison (footballer) =

English footballer

Personal information
- Full name: Thomas Harrison
- Date of birth: 31 January 1866
- Place of birth: Birmingham, England
- Date of death: 1942 (aged 74–75)
- Position: Winger

Senior career*
Years	Team	Apps	(Gls)
- Coombs Wood
1888–1889	Aston Villa	1	(0)
- Halesowen
- Handsworth Richmond
- * Club domestic league appearances and goals

Thomas Harrison ( 31 January 1866 – 1942) was an English footballer who played in The Football League for Aston Villa.

Harrison signed, age 21, for Coombs Wood F.C.. There is a modern Coombs Wood F.C. club but there is no data about a Coombs Wood F.C. in the 1880's.

Thomas Harrison made his only League appearance in 1888–1889, the inaugural Football league season. He played left-wing for Villa at Trent Bridge, then home of Notts County. Villa won 4–2 on 8 December 1888.
