= Arthur Wollaston =

Footballer

Personal information
- Full name: Arthur Wilbert Wollaston
- Date of birth: March 1865
- Place of birth: Shrewsbury, England
- Date of death: 1933 (aged 67–68)
- Position: Half back

Senior career*
Years	Team	Apps	(Gls)
1886 - 1888	Stafford Road		
1888–1889	Aston Villa	4	(0)
–	Chirk AAA		
- * Club domestic league appearances and goals

Arthur Wilbert Wollaston (March 1865 – 1933) was an English footballer who played as a half back in The Football League for Aston Villa. One source states Wollaston' middle name was William.

In 1886, aged 21, he signed for Stafford Road, where he played for two years.

Arthur played a minor role in the Aston Villa squad during the inaugural 1888–1889 Football League season. He made his League debut at right-half on 8 December 1888 when Aston Villa played Notts County at Trent Bridge, which Aston Villa won comfortably, 4–2. Wollaston played 4 League games at right-half and one FA Cup tie at left-half. After playing against Derby County at County Ground, Wollaston never played League football again.
