= Frank Coulton =

English footballer

Personal information
- Full name: Francis Coulton
- Date of birth: Quarter 3 1866
- Place of birth: Birmingham, England
- Date of death: 1929 (aged 62–63)
- Position: Defender

Senior career*
Years	Team	Apps	(Gls)
1884–1886	Walsall Swifts		
1886–1893	Aston Villa	38	(0)
- * Club domestic league appearances and goals

Francis Coulton (1866–1929) was an English footballer who played in the Football League for Aston Villa.

Frank Coulton first signed for Walsall Swifts F.C. in 1884 and left for Aston Villa in 1886.

== Season 1888-89 ==
Described as a stylish full back, he was a key member of the Aston Villa League defence in the inaugural season of 1888-89 which only conceded 43 goals, the third lowest. He played in the opening match on 8 September 1888 at Dudley Road, Wolverhampton, the then home of Wolverhampton Wanderers. The match finished 1–1. Coulton played at full-back. Coulton only missed three League games and one FA Cup tie over the season as Aston Villa finished as runners-up. As a full-back he played in a defence that achieved one League clean-sheet and kept the opposition to one-League-goal-in-a-match on no less than on nine occasions.

== Statistics ==
Appearances and goals by club, season and competition
Club	Season	League			FA Cup		Total	
Club	Season	Division	Apps	Goals	Apps	Goals	Apps	Goals
Aston Villa	1888–89	The Football League	19	0	2	0	21	0
Aston Villa	1889–90	Football League	13	0	2	0	15	0
Aston Villa	1890–91	Football League	3	0	2	0	5	0
Aston Villa	1890–91	First Division	1	0	-	-	1	0
