= Harry Yates (footballer, born 1861) =

English footballer (1861–1932)

Personal information
- Full name: Harry Richard Yates
- Date of birth: 14 October 1861
- Place of birth: Walsall, England
- Date of death: 1932 (aged 70–71)
- Position: Wing-half

Senior career*
Years	Team	Apps	(Gls)
1883–1885	Walsall Swifts		
1885–1890	Aston Villa	14	(0)
1890	Birmingham St. George's		
1890–1898	Walsall	4	(0)
- * Club domestic league appearances and goals

Harry Richard Yates (14 October 1861 – 1932) was an English footballer who played in The Football League for Aston Villa and Walsall.

Signed, age 22 for Walsall Swifts in 1883 and stayed for two seasons when he signed for Aston Villa F.C..

== Career ==
He was a member of the FA Cup winning team when Aston Villa beat West Bromwich Albion 2–0 in 1887

== Season 1888-89 ==
Yates played in the 1888–89 inaugural English Football League season. He made his League debut on 8 September 1888 at Dudley Road, Wolverhampton, then home of Wolverhampton Wanderers F.C. Yates played at Right-Half in a team that drew 1–1. Yates played 13 of the 22 League games. As a wing-half, he played in a midfield that achieved a big win on three occasions. Yates, weighing 14 stone, was known as "Tubby Yates" and played as a defensive wing-half. Yates assisted Aston Villa to finish second in the League.

== Season 1889-1890 ==
This season was the last season for Yates at Aston Villa and he made only one First-Team appearance. His last appearance was on 7 December 1890 when Stoke were the visitors. Villa won 6–1 and Yates played at Right-Half.

== 1890 onwards ==
Yates left Villa in 1890 and moved to Birmingham St George's for a brief stay as by August he signed for Walsall. During the spell 1892–1898 Walsall had to spells in the Second Division. In 1898–1899 Yates played four times at Centre-Half for Walsall in the Second Division. He retired in May 1898 after a long-term hip injury. Nothing is recorded about what Yates did from 1898 to his death in 1932.

== Playing Style ==
Matthews described Yates as a 14 stone solid defender with immense power. A strong, forceful tackler.

== Statistics ==
Appearances and goals by club, season and competition
Club	Season	League			FA Cup		Total	
Club	Season	Division	Apps	Goals	Apps	Goals	Apps	Goals
Aston Villa	1888–89	The Football League	13	0	2	0	15	0
Aston Villa	1889–90	Football League	1	0	-	-	1	0
Walsall	1898–99	Second Division	4	0	-	-	4	0
