= Frankie Dawson =

English footballer

Fred Dawson
Personal information
- Full name: Frederick Henry Herbert Dawson
- Date of birth: 23 June 1862
- Place of birth: Birmingham, England
- Date of death: 1938 (aged 79–80)
- Position: Wing half

Senior career*
Years	Team	Apps	(Gls)
1879-1880	Aston Unity		
1880–1889	Aston Villa	3	(0)
- * Club domestic league appearances and goals

Frederick Henry Herbert Dawson (also known as Frankie) (23 June 1862 – 1938) was an English footballer who played as a left-half in the Football League for Aston Villa.

He joined Aston Unity in 1879 and left the following year in 1880 and signed for Aston Villa.

Described as a tenacious opponent, Frankie was in the 1886-87 FA Cup-winning side. Fred only played three League games for Aston Villa, all in 1888–89. Frankie played at left-half in the debut League match for Aston Villa. The date was 8 September 1888 and the venue was Dudley Road, the then home of Wolverhampton Wanderers. The match ended 1–1. On 6 October 1888 Fred Dawson played at wing–half against Everton. Dawson was approximately 29 years 296 days old; which made him, on that fifth weekend of League football, Aston Villa's oldest League player. Dawson played two more games, all in 1888. The only time he was on the winning side was on 29 December 1888 when playing his only game at Wellington Road, Birmingham. Aston Villa beat Derby County 4–2.

One source described Dawson as a player who played with evident enjoyment, tenacity and constructiveness.

== Professional baseball ==
In 1890 Dawson played professional baseball for Aston Villa in the National League of Baseball of Great Britain.

== Honours ==
=== Club ===
Aston Villa

- FA Cup: 1887
- Baseball: 1890
