= Tommy Green (footballer, born 1863) =

English footballer

Personal information
- Full name: Thomas Walter Green
- Date of birth: 7 August 1863
- Place of birth: Worcester, England
- Date of death: 2 October 1923 (aged 60)
- Position: Forward

Senior career*
Years	Team	Apps	(Gls)
1879–1880	Dreadnought F.C.		
1880–1881	Mitchell St. George's		
1881–1882	Small Heath Alliance		
1881–1882	Wolverhampton Wanderers		
1881–1882	Church Villa F.C.		
1882–1883	Mitchell St. George's		
1883–1884	Aston Unity F.C.		
1883–1884	Great Lever		
1884–1885	Mitchell St. George's		
1885–1887	West Bromwich Albion		
1887–1889	Aston Villa	22	(14)
1889–1890	Kidderminster Harriers		
1891–1892	Birmingham St. George's		
1901–1902	Worcester Rovers		
- * Club domestic league appearances and goals

Thomas Walter Green (August 1863 – 2 October 1923) was an English footballer, known for scoring Aston Villa's first goal in the Football League.

== Playing career ==
He played for Dreadnought F.C., Mitchell St George's, Aston Unity F.C., Great Lever, Small Heath Alliance, Church Villa F.C., West Bromwich Albion, Kidderminster Harriers and Worcester Rovers as well as guesting for several teams, including Wolverhampton Wanderers, the club he had scored Villa's first league goal against.

He played in Albion's 1886 and 1887 FA Cup finals, losing both (the latter against Villa).

== Season 1888-89 ==
Tommy Green played one season in the Football League (1888–1889), the inaugural season. His League Debut was in the first Aston Villa League match, he played as a forward, at Dudley Road, Wolverhampton on 8 September 1888 and Green scored Aston Villa' 1st ever League goal in a 1–1 draw with Wolverhampton Wanderers. On 15 September 1888 Tommy Green became the first Aston Villa player to score two League goals. Tommy scored his only League hat-trick on 29 September 1888 as Villa routed Notts County 9–1. Green scored 2 in a match twice. In season 1888–89 he played all 22 of Aston Villa' League games scoring 14 goals. As a forward he played in a forward-line that scored three-League-goals-or-more-in-a-match on no less than ten occasions. He scored 19 goals in 29 Villa starts and was the 2nd top scorer for Villa in a team that finished 2nd.

Green was described as an enthusiastic forward. In an era in which centre-forwards were expected to be able to charge goalkeepers into the goals, Green was known as the most brutal in the game.

His son, Tommy, played for Albion, West Ham United and Coventry City.
