= Dennis Hodgetts =

English footballer

Personal information
- Date of birth: 28 November 1863
- Place of birth: Birmingham, England
- Date of death: 25 March 1945 (aged 81)
- Position: Forward

Senior career*
Years	Team	Apps	(Gls)
1878–1881	Mitchell St George's		
1881–1882	Great Lever		
1882–1886	Mitchell St George's		
1886–1896	Aston Villa	181	(62)
1896–1897	Small Heath	22	(9)

International career
1888–1894	England	6	(1)
- * Club domestic league appearances and goals

Dennis Hodgetts (28 November 1863 – 25 March 1945), commonly known as Denny Hodgetts, was a footballer in the early years of professional football in England.

Signed as a Youth player for Mitchell St George's in 1878 and played for three years.

When 17 he signed for Great Lever for the 1881–82 season.

In 1882 he returned to Mitchell St. George's F.C. where he stayed for four years.

Hodgetts signed for Aston Villa in February 1886. The following year he scored the first goal in Aston Villa's first FA Cup final triumph. In 1895 he collected another FA Cup winners medal with Villa. Hodgetts was also a key member of the Football League title-winning sides of 1894 and 1896.

== Season 1888–89 ==
Hodgetts was described as powerful and alert and good with both feet. He could shoot and pass expertly. He was outstanding at crossing the ball on the run. He played in Aston Villa' opening League game, as a winger, at Dudley Road, Wolverhampton, then home of Wolverhampton Wanderers. The match ended 1–1.

Denny Hodgetts played 17 of the 22 League games Aston Villa played in the 1888–89 season scoring seven League goals, including two in a match against Everton at Dudley Road on 22 September 1888 – His debut League goals and three FA Cup goals finishing as Joint 3rd top scorer with Archie Hunter. As a winger he played in a midfield that achieved a big (three-League-goals-or-more-in-a-match) win on four occasions. He assisted Aston Villa to finish League runners-up.

On the eve of Villa's Double-winning success in 1897 (in what would have been his third FA Cup final with Villa) Hodgetts transferred to local rivals Small Heath, and retired after one season there.

He made six appearances for England between 1888 and 1894, scoring once.

He went on to become a publican, and in 1930 was elected Aston Villa's vice-president, a position he held until his death, aged 81, in March 1945.

A born football player. Remarkably clever with his feet, and possessed many original ideas. Effective in combination, an admirable coach, his skill and unselfishness having the happiest results. Shone especially in 'nursing' players lighter and less skilful than himself, many juniors coming into prominence on the strength of his tuition and example.

The Villa News and Record 1 Sept. 1906

== Statistics ==
Appearances and goals by club, season and competition
Club	Season	League			FA Cup		Total	
Club	Season	Division	Apps	Goals	Apps	Goals	Apps	Goals
Aston Villa	1888–89	The Football League	17	7	3	3	20	10
Aston Villa	1889–90	Football League	19	8	2	3	21	11
Aston Villa	1890–91	Football League	18	4	2	4	20	8
Aston Villa	1891–92	Football League	24	9	5	6	34	15
Aston Villa	1892–93	First Division	28	8	1	0	29	8
Aston Villa	1893–94	First Division	29	12	4	2	33	14
Aston Villa	1894–95	First Division	25	11	5	0	30	11
Aston Villa	1895–96	First Division	21	3	1	1	22	4
Small Heath	1896–97	Second Division	22	9	1	0	23	9
