= Archie Hunter =

Scottish footballer (1859–1894)

Personal information
- Full name: Archibald Hunter
- Date of birth: 23 September 1859
- Place of birth: Joppa, Ayrshire, Scotland
- Date of death: 29 November 1894 (aged 35)
- Place of death: Aston, Birmingham, England
- Position: Forward

Senior career*
Years	Team	Apps	(Gls)
1877–1878	Ayr Thistle		
1878	Third Lanark		
1878–1890	Aston Villa	32	(8)
- * Club domestic league appearances and goals

Archibald Hunter (23 September 1859 – 29 November 1894) was a Scottish footballer who played as a forward. He was one of Victorian football's first household names and in 1887, was the first captain of Aston Villa to lift the FA Cup.

== Life and career ==
Born in Joppa near Ayr, Hunter played for Ayr Thistle and Third Lanark (featuring on the losing side in the 1878 Scottish Cup Final).

He signed for Aston Villa in August 1878, four years after their formation. The 1879–80 English football season saw Aston Villa's first ever FA Cup tie and thus their entry into top flight competitive association football. The start of the official record was Saturday 13 December 1879 when Villa faced Stafford Road F.C., of the Stafford Road railway works, Wolverhampton. The match was played before a crowd of 2,000 at Stafford's Half-Way House Ground. In 2024, celebrating the club's 150th anniversary, Aston Villa Legacy Numbers were introduced indexing every first-team player who had represented the club in a competitive fixture. Although playing before shirt numbers were introduced in 1926, Goalkeeper John Ball received Legacy Number 1. Archie Hunter #5 played centre-forward in the match.

Hunter made his League debut in the inaugural season on 15 September 1888 at Wellington Road, as a forward, against Stoke. Aston Villa won 5–1 and Hunter scored one of the goals. He missed three League games (out of 22) in 1888–89 and scored seven League goals including one brace. In his league career (1888–1890) he played 73 matches scoring 42 goals. Also his 36 goals for Villa in the FA Cup (including 3 in 1888–1889) remains the club record in the competition.

Despite being one of the greats of the 19th century game, Hunter never fulfilled his dream of playing for Scotland against England. This is because at the time the Scottish Football Association had a policy of not picking 'Anglo-Scots' (i.e. Scots who played in the English League) which persisted until 1896.

Hunter originally came to Birmingham planning to sign for Calthorpe F.C., but was persuaded to sign for Villa instead, ostensibly after hearing of Aston Villa's Scottish connections, although, given Hunter "had become acquainted with the Calthorpe Football Club" when in Scotland, and given Calthorpe had been founded and run by Scots, and played in Scottish colours, this rationale is questionable. Calthorpe's links with Queen's Park F.C. meant the club was resolutely amateur, unlike Villa. Hunter later recalled in his memoirs;

Aston Villa to me as a club that had come rapidly to the fore and asked me to become a member of it. I hesitated for some time, but at last my friend told me that a "brother Scot," Mr. George Ramsay, was the Villa captain and that decided me. Mr. Ramsay was a Glasgow man and had exerted himself very considerably to bring the Villa team into the front rank.

— Archie Hunter, Triumphs of the Football Field

He was idolized by the crowds and became the first player to score in every round of the FA Cup in Villa's victorious 1887 campaign.

Archie Hunter was a prince of dribblers. It was not an unusual performance of his to start at the half way mark, and dribble through the whole of the opposing team! he would not lose the ball until he had literally dribbled it between the posts.

— Association Football and the Men Who Made It (1906)

During a League match against Everton in 1890, Hunter suffered a heart attack and collapsed. He never played again, and died in Aston at the age of 35. It is said that on his death-bed he asked to be lifted up one last time to see the crowd going to Perry Barr (then Villa's home).

His brother Andy also played for Villa, and scored their first ever FA Cup goal. Another brother, John, was a Scotland international.

One source described Hunter as "a great player – one of the best footballers of the 1880s and 90s". The source characterized him as an individualist with a commanding personality who was robust yet fair and never committed a foul in anger. Known as 'The Old Warhorse', he was described as a mixture of toughness and cleverness, and a player who often ran down the touchline, pulling defenders across the field.

== Legacy ==
In 1998, Hunter was inducted into the English Football League's list of 100 legends.

The headstone on his grave reads:

This monument is erected in loving memory of Archie Hunter, the famous captain of Aston Villa, by his football comrades and the club as a lasting tribute to his ability on the field and his sterling worth as a man.

== Career statistics ==
Appearances and goals by club, season and competition
Club	Season	League			FA Cup		Total	
Club	Season	Division	Apps	Goals	Apps	Goals	Apps	Goals
Aston Villa	1888–89	The Football League	19	7	3	3	22	10
Aston Villa	1889–90	The Football League	13	2	0	0	13	2
Aston Villa	Total		32	9	3	3	35	12

== See also ==
- List of Scottish football families
