= Wellington Road (Perry Barr) =

Football ground in Birmingham, England

- Interactive map of Wellington Road
- Location: Perry Barr, Birmingham
- Coordinates: 52.5149°N 1.9039°W
- Surface: Grass
- Record attendance: 26,849

Construction
- Opened: 1876
- Closed: 1897

Tenant
- Aston Villa

Wellington Road was a football ground in the Perry Barr area of Birmingham, England. It was the home ground of Aston Villa from 1876 until 1897.

During the 1890s Wellington Road was used to host two FA Cup semi-finals. In 1889–90 it hosted the Bolton Wanderers–The Wednesday match (1–2), and in 1895–96 hosted the Derby County–Wolverhampton Wanderers game (also 1–2). It was also used as a home venue for the England team, hosting a British Home Championship match on 25 February 1893, with England beating Ireland 6–1.

== History ==
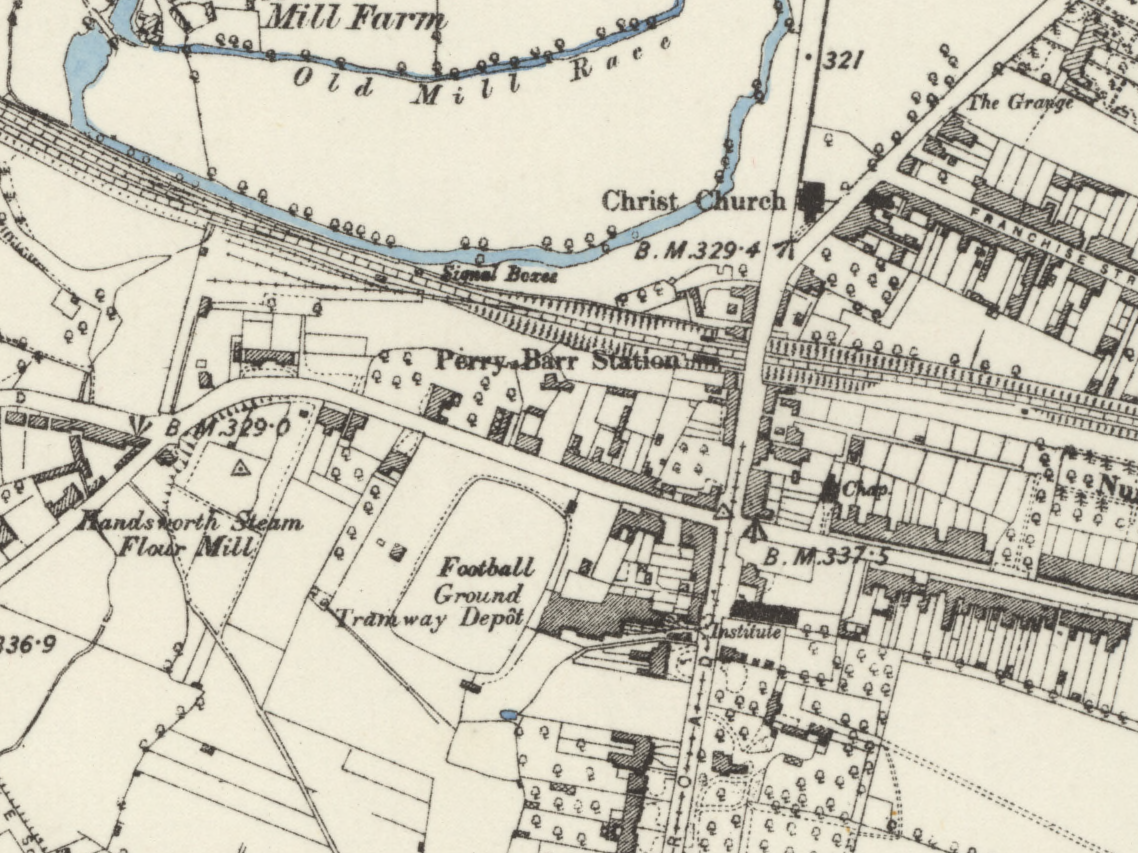
The site on an Ordnance Survey map surveyed in 1887, south of Wellington Road and west of Birchfield Road (now the A34)

Wellington Road was opened in 1876 when Aston Villa moved to the ground. On 30 September the first team faced Wednesbury Town while the Seconds played at the Wednesbury ground. There were initially no spectator facilities; players changed in a nearby blacksmith's shed, and a hayrick was kept on the pitch, which had to be removed prior to matches. The pitch also had a slope away from one goal. There were no groundsmen and the pitch was grazed prior to a game.

Play was hampered by a hedge and three trees along the touchline. There was no money available so, instead of Saturday training, the players themselves felled the trees. They sold the wood to finance fencing and a gate which they erected themselves, enabling them to charge twopence admission. The first gate amounted to 6s 7½d. Charlie Johnstone recalled that the team retired to the Crown & Cushion pub with the first takings. The pub would serve as changing rooms and club house.

The club hosted sports athletic events at the ground from 1878 onwards. Here, in particular, Johnstone, Tommy Pank and Howard Vaughton excelled.

Increasing gate money allowed the ground to be gradually improved, with a grandstand built on the eastern touchline and two pavilions built on the western touchline and behind the southern goal line. The ground's record attendance of 26,849 was set for an FA Cup fifth round match against Preston North End on 7 January 1888. Preston won 3–1, and the match was marred by a huge pitch invasion, the first serious incidence of crowd trouble in English football. Later in 1888 Villa were founder members of the Football League, and the first League match was played at Wellington Road on 15 September 1888, with Villa beating Stoke 5–1 in front of 2,000 spectators.

Frederick Rinder had become the club's financial secretary in 1892 and set about installing turnstiles. Gate receipts immediately increased from £75 to £250. During the 1892-93 season, with the purpose of keeping an eye on the players, a clubhouse was built with billiards and non-alcoholic refreshments.

With an uneven pitch and growing crowds, it became increasingly apparent that the ground was inadequate. In addition, the land at the Wellington Road ground had initially been sub-let to the club for an annual rent of £5, but as Villa became more successful the rent kept rising and rising and the Bridge Trust landlords would not grant a sufficiently long lease to justify the expenditure needed to improve the facilities to match the club's ambition. Vice-President Charlie Johnstone acquired an option at the Lower Grounds in Aston, and together with Chairman Fred Rinder they secured the deal to enable the club to move to a new home ground. The club moved to what became Villa Park towards the end of the 1896–97 season. The last league match played at Wellington Road on 22 March 1897, with Villa beating Bolton Wanderers 6–2 in front of 8,000 spectators. Part of the site was later used for the housing on Leslie and Willmore Roads.
