= Eli Davis =

English footballer (born 1855)

Personal information
- Date of birth: December 1855
- Place of birth: Dudley, Worcs
- Position: Inside left

Senior career*
Years	Team	Apps	(Gls)
1877–79	Birmingham Excelsior		
1879–1885	Aston Villa	22	(3)
- * Club domestic league appearances and goals

Elisha Davis (born December 1855, Dudley) was an English footballer. He played in Aston Villa's first ever FA Cup tie.

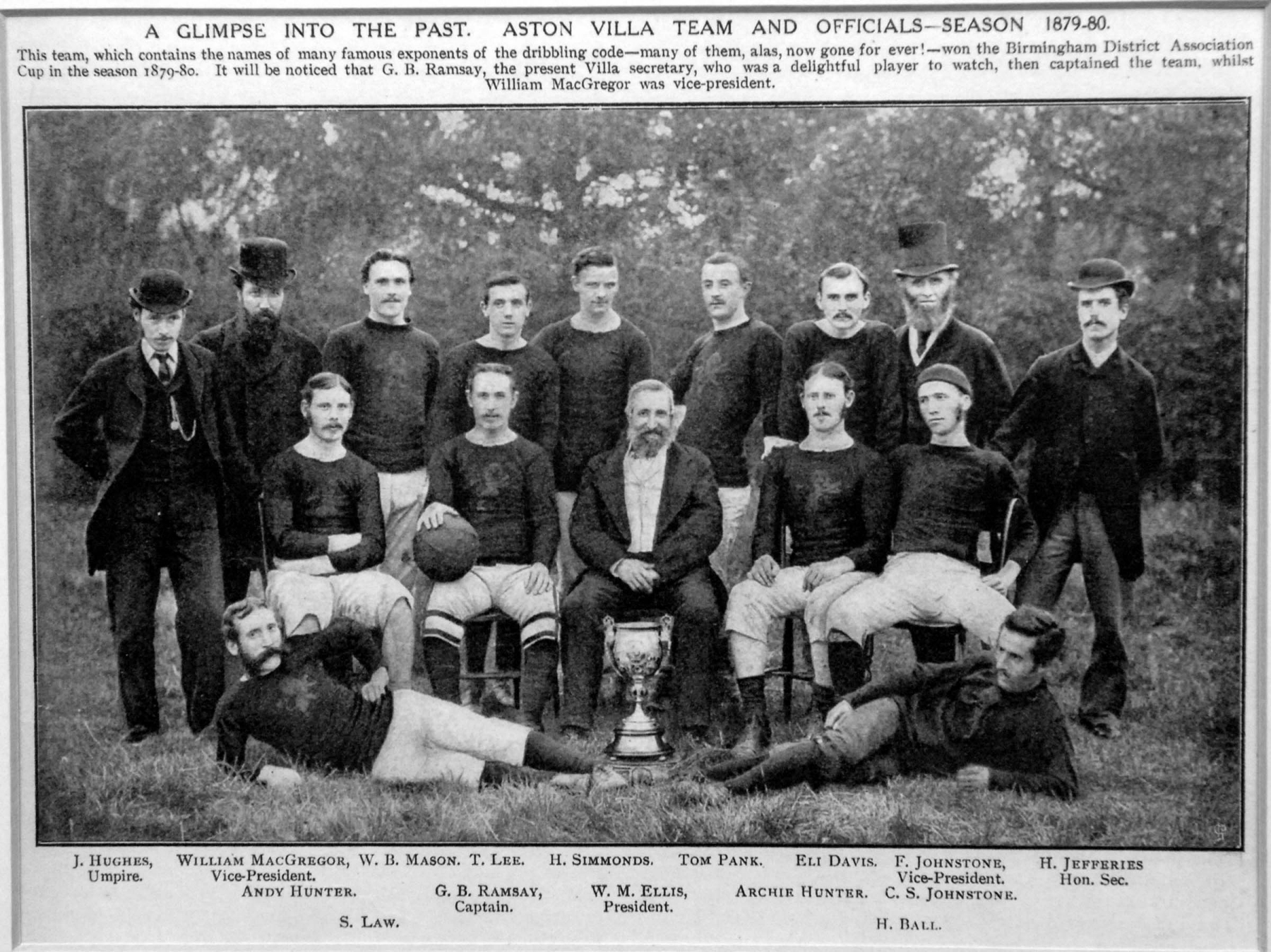
Eli Davis, 3rd right, back row Aston Villa 1879–80

Mason played for Villa on Easter Monday, April 1878 when they faced Sheffield's Heeley Club. Heeley were generally considered favourites by reason of their pedigree but they were beaten 4-0 by a team with technical superiority and pace.

The 1879–80 English football season saw Aston Villa's entry into top flight competitive association football with their first tie in the FA Cup. The start of the official record was Saturday 13 December 1879 when Villa faced Stafford Road F.C., of the Stafford Road railway works, Wolverhampton. The match was played before a crowd of 2,000 at Stafford's Half-Way House Ground. In 2024, celebrating the club's 150th anniversary, Aston Villa Legacy Numbers were introduced indexing every first-team player who had represented the club in a competitive fixture. Although playing before shirt numbers were introduced in 1926, Goalkeeper John Ball received Legacy Number 1. Inside-left Davis received Legacy Number #3, Andy Hunter #4, officially became Villa's first goal-scorer in the 1–1 draw.

The 29-year-old Davis played his final game on 10 January 1885 in Villa's 3rd round loss 0–3 away to Albion. He subsequently retired.
