= 1879–80 Aston Villa F.C. season =

Aston Villa
1879–80 season
- Chairman: William McGregor
- FA Cup: 2nd round
- Top goalscorer: League: All: Billy Mason

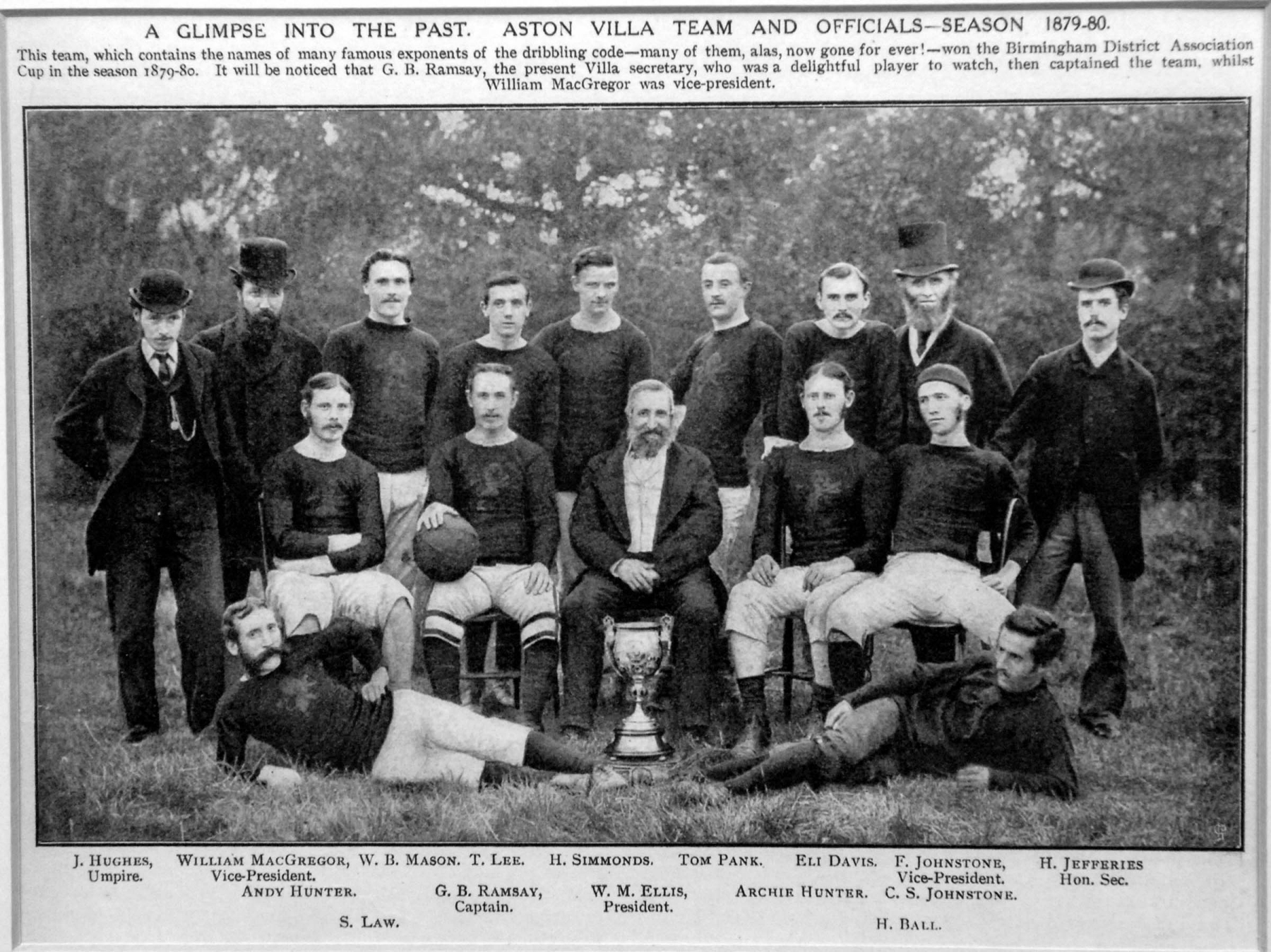
Aston Villa 1879–80

The 1879–80 English football season saw Aston Villa's first ever FA Cup tie This season, nine years before the creation of the Football League, Villa collected their first ever piece of silverware, the Birmingham Senior Cup. They defeated Saltley College 3–2 in the final with goals from Eli Davis, William Mason and George Ramsay in front of 6,000 at Aston Lower Grounds.

J. Hughes was Aston Villa's umpire in the last season before a referee would be appointed before the match. Originally team captains would consult each other in order to resolve any dispute on the pitch. Eventually this role was delegated to an umpire. Each team would bring their own partisan umpire allowing the team captains to concentrate on the game. In 1881, the referee, a third "neutral" official was added; this referee would be "referred to" if the umpires could not resolve a dispute. The referee did not take his place on the pitch until 1891, when the umpires became linesmen (now assistant referees).

Villa were beaten 2–1 by Wednesbury Old Athletic in the final of the Staffordshire Cup.

== FA Cup ==
- 1st Round bye

13 December 1879 2nd Round	Stafford Road	1–1	Aston Villa
		Report
Note: On Saturday 13 December 1879 Villa faced Stafford Road F.C., of the Stafford Road railway works, Wolverhampton. The match was played before a crowd of 2,000 at Stafford's Half-Way House Ground. As the start of the official record, in 2024, celebrating the club's 150th anniversary, Aston Villa Legacy Numbers were introduced indexing every player who had represented the club in a first-class competitive fixture. Although playing before shirt numbers were introduced in 1926, Goalkeeper John Ball received Legacy Number 1. Andy Hunter #4 officially became Villa's first goal-scorer in the 1-1 draw. There were also first-class debuts for William Crossland #2, Harry Simmonds #11, Tommy Pank #10, Sammy Law #7, Ted Lee #8, Eli Davis #3, Billy Mason #9, Archie Hunter #5 and Charlie Johnstone #6.

24 January 1880 2nd Round Replay	Aston Villa	3–1	Stafford Road
		Report
Note: The replay was held at Villa's Wellington Road ground in Perry Bar on 24 January 1880. Underdogs Villa defeated Stafford Road 3–1. Billy Mason scored a brace with Sammy Law getting the third goal. For the replay, inside-forward and future manager George Ramsay #12 replaced Johnstone. Ramsay had joined Villa in 1876. The 21-year-old came across a Villa players' practice match whilst taking a stroll in Aston Park. When asked to make up the numbers, they were amazed by his display of close ball control. Ramsay was invited to join the club and he soon he became captain. Word spread about how fine a player Ramsay was, spectators began turning up to watch the little man nicknamed 'Scotty'. He also took charge of training which saw dramatic improvement in results, introducing what was known as the "passing game". This had become the main style of play in Scotland whereas in England most teams relied on what was known as the "dribbling game".

3rd Round	Oxford University	—	Aston Villa
Note: Villa's first attempt to win the FA Cup ended in controversy and confusion. Villa were drawn to play the then-successful Oxford University but had lost the toss for home status in the third round tie. Oxford had beaten Birmingham 6-0 in the previous round. Perhaps feeling that it was a waste of time spending good money on travel expenses for a match they felt they would lose, the Villa board took the decision to 'scratch' (forfeit) the game.

== Birmingham Cup ==
The 1879–80 Birmingham Senior Cup was the fourth season of the oldest county cup competition still active and the third oldest in the world overall. Aston Villa beat Saltley College 3–1 in the final.

Villa beat Birmingham Excelsior 8–1 in the second round. On Saturday 14 February, in the third round of the Birmingham Senior Cup, Villa registered 16 undefeated when they beat Newport (Salop) 7-0. They beat Walsall Swifts in the semi-finals.

Aston Unity's best run in the Birmingham Cup, at the time the second-most prestigious tournament for football clubs in the Midlands, came in 1879–80, the club beating Small Heath Alliance and St George's (the latter 9–1 away from home), before losing to Villa at the Aston Lower Grounds; because of Villa's predatory poaching of players in the area, and importation of Scots shamateurs, "partisanship on both sides ran high", and Unity played a more brutal game than normal, Villa's Eli Davis having to go off injured, but the ten men won with a late goal from George Ramsay.

== Friendlies ==
A "Second City derby" occurred on 27 September 1879, when Villa played Small Heath Alliance. The game, on a pitch at Small Heath's Muntz Street ground described by the Villa players as "only suitable for pot-holing", finished 1–0 – recorded as "one goal and a disputed goal to nil" – to the home side.

On New Year's Day 1880 Villa beat the visiting Heart of Midlothian 4-2, while on Saturday, 3 January the Second team lost 4-2 to Aston Unity at Aston Lane.
