= Harry Simmonds =

English footballer (1858–?)

Personal information
- Date of birth: January 1858
- Place of birth: Handsworth, West Midlands
- Position: Half back

Senior career*
Years	Team	Apps	(Gls)
1879–1882	Aston Villa	10	(0)
- * Club domestic league appearances and goals

Harry Simmonds (June 1858 – 3 Aug 1939) was an English footballer notable for playing in Aston Villa's first ever FA Cup tie.

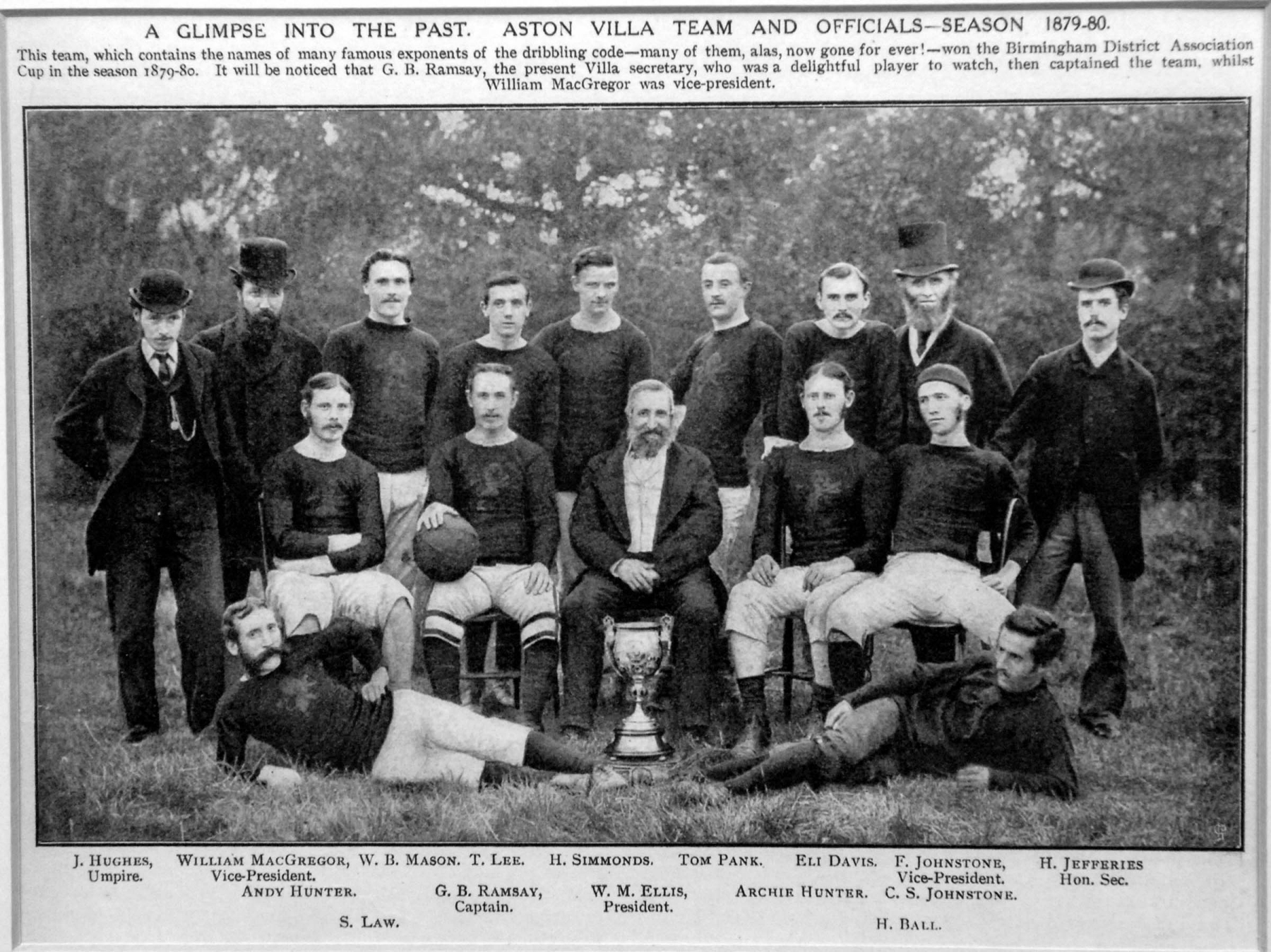
Aston Villa 1879–80, Simmonds is middle back row

The 1879–80 English football season saw Aston Villa's entry into top flight competitive association football with their first tie in the Football Association Cup. The start of the official record was Saturday 13 December 1879 when Villa faced Stafford Road F.C., of the Stafford Road railway works, Wolverhampton. The match was played before a crowd of 2,000 at Stafford's Half-Way House Ground. In 2024, celebrating the club's 150th anniversary, Aston Villa Legacy Numbers were introduced indexing every first-team player who had represented the club in a competitive fixture. Although playing before shirt numbers were introduced in 1926, Goalkeeper John Ball received Legacy Number 1. Defender Simmonds received Legacy Number #12, Andy Hunter #4 officially became Villa's first goal-scorer in the 1–1 draw.

The 23-year-old Simmonds played his final game on 21 January 1882 in Villa's 4th Round away defeat to Wednesbury Old Athletic He subsequently retired from the game due to an ankle injury.
