= Tommy Pank =

English footballer (1853–?)

Personal information
- Date of birth: January 1853
- Place of birth: Aston, Birmingham, England
- Position: Half back

Senior career*
Years	Team	Apps	(Gls)
1879–1882	Aston Villa	11	(0)
- * Club domestic league appearances and goals

Thomas Pank (January 1853 – ?) was an English footballer and athlete. He played in Aston Villa's first ever FA Cup tie.

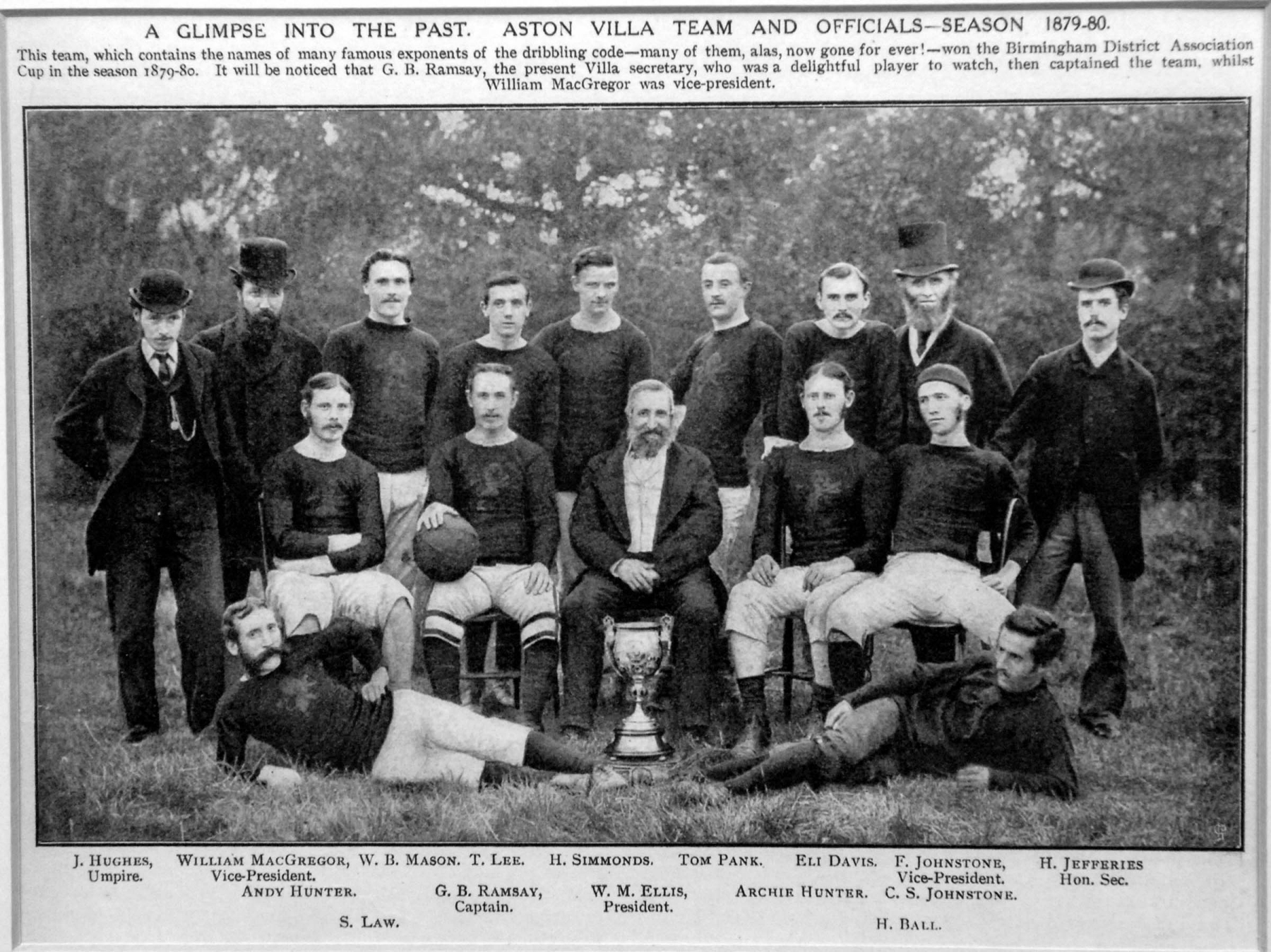
Aston Villa 1879–80, Pank, 4th right, back row

Birmingham Excelsior Football Club emerged from the Phœnix Cricket Club; the club's claimed foundation date is 1874 and the earliest record of fixtures for the football club are from October 1876. In 1877, after a dispute over a three-mile run, a number of club members - including Excelsior player/secretary Thomas Pank, who would soon join Aston Villa.

In June 1878 Pank, representing Aston Villa, placed second in his heat of the 220-yards-handicap at the amateur athletics meeting hosted by Handsworth Cricket Club. In June 1879, Birchfield Harriers held their first annual athletics meeting at the Aston Lower Grounds, attended by 4,000 despite the unfavourable weather. Pank placed first in the final heat of the one-mile bicycle handicap.

The 1879–80 English football season saw Aston Villa's entry into top flight competitive association football with their first tie in the FA Cup. The start of the official record was Saturday 13 December 1879 when Villa faced Stafford Road F.C., of the Stafford Road railway works, Wolverhampton. The match was played before a crowd of 2,000 at Stafford's Half-Way House Ground. In 2024, celebrating the club's 150th anniversary, Aston Villa Legacy Numbers were introduced indexing every first-team player who had represented the club in a competitive fixture. Although playing before shirt numbers were introduced in 1926, Goalkeeper John Ball received Legacy Number 1. Half-back Pank received Legacy Number #12, Andy Hunter #4 officially became Villa's first goal-scorer in the 1–1 draw.

The 29-year-old Pank played his final game on 21 January 1882 In Villa's 4th Round away defeat to Wednesbury Old Athletic. He subsequently retired. Pank moved to the East Coast where he name his house Aston Villa.
