= Sammy Law =

English footballer (1849–1919)

Silas Samuel Law
Personal information
- Date of birth: 13 January 1849
- Place of birth: Ladywood, Birmingham
- Date of death: 26 April 1919 (aged 70)
- Place of death: Lozells, Birmingham
- Position: Half back

Senior career*
Years	Team	Apps	(Gls)
1876–1882	Aston Villa	11	(1)
- * Club domestic league appearances and goals

Silas Samuel Law (13 January 1849 – 26 April 1919) was an English footballer. He played in Aston Villa's first ever FA Cup tie.

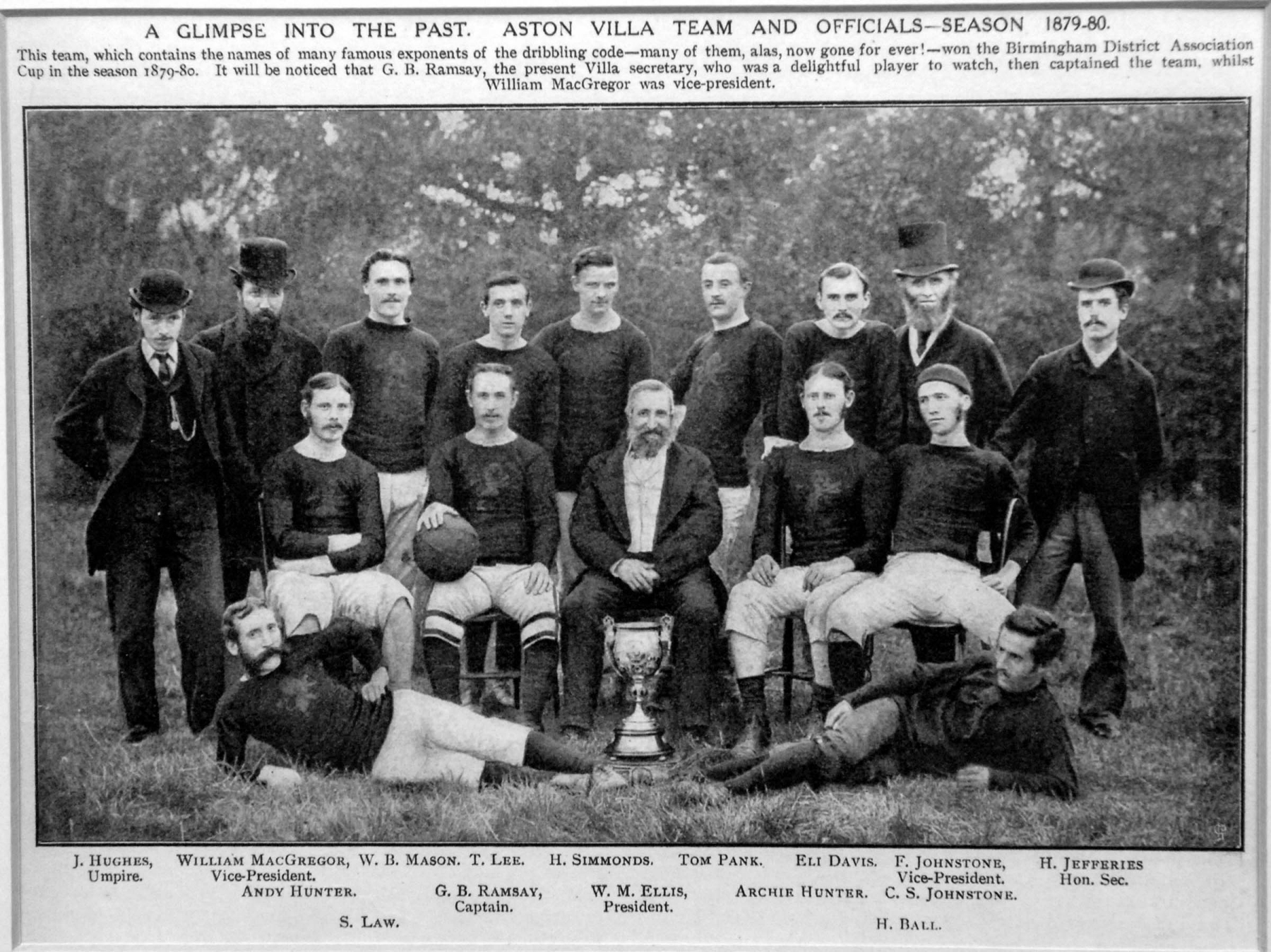
Aston Villa 1879–80, Law is bottom left

The 1879–80 English football season saw Aston Villa's entry into top flight competitive association football with their first tie in the FA Cup. The start of the official record was Saturday 13 December 1879 when Villa faced Stafford Road F.C., of the Stafford Road railway works, Wolverhampton. The match was played before a crowd of 2,000 at Stafford's Half-Way House Ground. In 2024, celebrating the club's 150th anniversary, Aston Villa Legacy Numbers were introduced indexing every first-team player who had represented the club in a competitive fixture. Although playing before shirt numbers were introduced in 1926, Goalkeeper John Ball received Legacy Number 1. Half-back Law received Legacy Number #7, Andy Hunter #4, officially became Villa's first goal-scorer in the 1–1 draw.

The replay was held at Villa's Wellington Road ground on 24 January 1880 with inside-forward George Ramsay #12 replacing Charlie Johnstone. Villa defeated Stafford Road 3–1. Billy Mason scored a brace with Law getting the third goal.

The 32-year-old Law played his final game on 21 January 1882 in Villa's 4th Round away defeat to Wednesbury Old Athletic. He subsequently retired.
