= Henry Mitchell =

Henry Mitchell may refer to:

== Law and politics ==
- Henry Mitchell (Irish judge) (c. 1320–1384), Irish judge of the fourteenth century
- Henry Mitchell (New York politician) (1784–1856), American politician
- Henry L. Mitchell (1831–1903), governor of Florida
- Henry Taiporutu Te Mapu-o-te-rangi Mitchell (1877–1944), New Zealand Ngāti Pikiao leader
- John Henry Mitchell, Canadian politician

== Sportspeople ==
- Henry Mitchell (footballer) (1874–1943), Australian rules footballer
- Kent Mitchell (Henry Kent Mitchell II, born 1939), American rower and Olympic medalist

== Other uses ==
- Henry Mitchell (brewer) (1837–1913), of Mitchells & Butlers Brewery
  - His son, Henry Mitchell Junior, known as Harry Mitchell
- Henry Mitchell (engraver) (1835–?), American engraver
- Henry Mitchell (mill owner) (1824–1898), British woollen mill owner
- Henry Mitchell (oceanographer) (1830–1902), American oceanographer, namesake of USC&GS Mitchell
- H. Lane Mitchell (Henry Lane Mitchell, 1895–1978), Public works commissioner in Shreveport, Louisiana, 1934 to 1968

== Fictional characters ==
- Henry Mitchell, a fictional character from the television series Charmed; see List of Charmed characters
- Henry Mitchell, a fictional character, Dennis's father in the U.S. comic strip Dennis the Menace
- Henry Ramsay (Neighbours), also known as Henry Mitchell, fictional character in the Australian soap opera Neighbours

== See also ==
- Mitchell Henry (1826–1910), English financier and MP for Galway County
- Harry Mitchell (disambiguation)
