= Wilbert Harrison (footballer) =

English footballer

Personal information
- Full name: Wilbert Harrison
- Date of birth: 1867
- Place of birth: Birmingham, England
- Date of death: Unknown
- Position: Centre forward

Senior career*
Years	Team	Apps	(Gls)
- Birmingham Excelsior
1886–1891	Birmingham St George's		
1891–1892	Small Heath	1	(2)
1892–1???	Summerfield Saints		
- * Club domestic league appearances and goals

Wilbert Harrison (1867 – after 1892) was an English professional footballer who played in the Football Alliance for Birmingham St George's and Small Heath.

Harrison was born in the Bordesley Green district of Birmingham. He played football for Birmingham Excelsior before joining Birmingham St George's in 1886. He became the star of their attack, and played for them in the Football Alliance, but was one of several players offloaded when the club got into financial difficulties and joined local rivals and fellow Football Alliance club Small Heath in August 1891. He played only once for Small Heath's first team, scoring both goals in a 2–2 draw at Ardwick in January 1892, but his career was in decline, and later that year he returned to local football with Summerfield Saints.
