= Birmingham Football Club (Aston Lower Grounds) =

Birmingham
- Full name: The Birmingham Cricket & Football Club
- Nickname: the B.C.C.
- Founded: 1874
- Dissolved: 1880
- Ground: Aston Lower Grounds
- Secretary: C. H. Quilter, J. R. Riddell
Home colours

The Birmingham Club was an English association football club based at the cricket pitch on the Aston Lower Grounds, and one of the first clubs in Birmingham.

== History ==
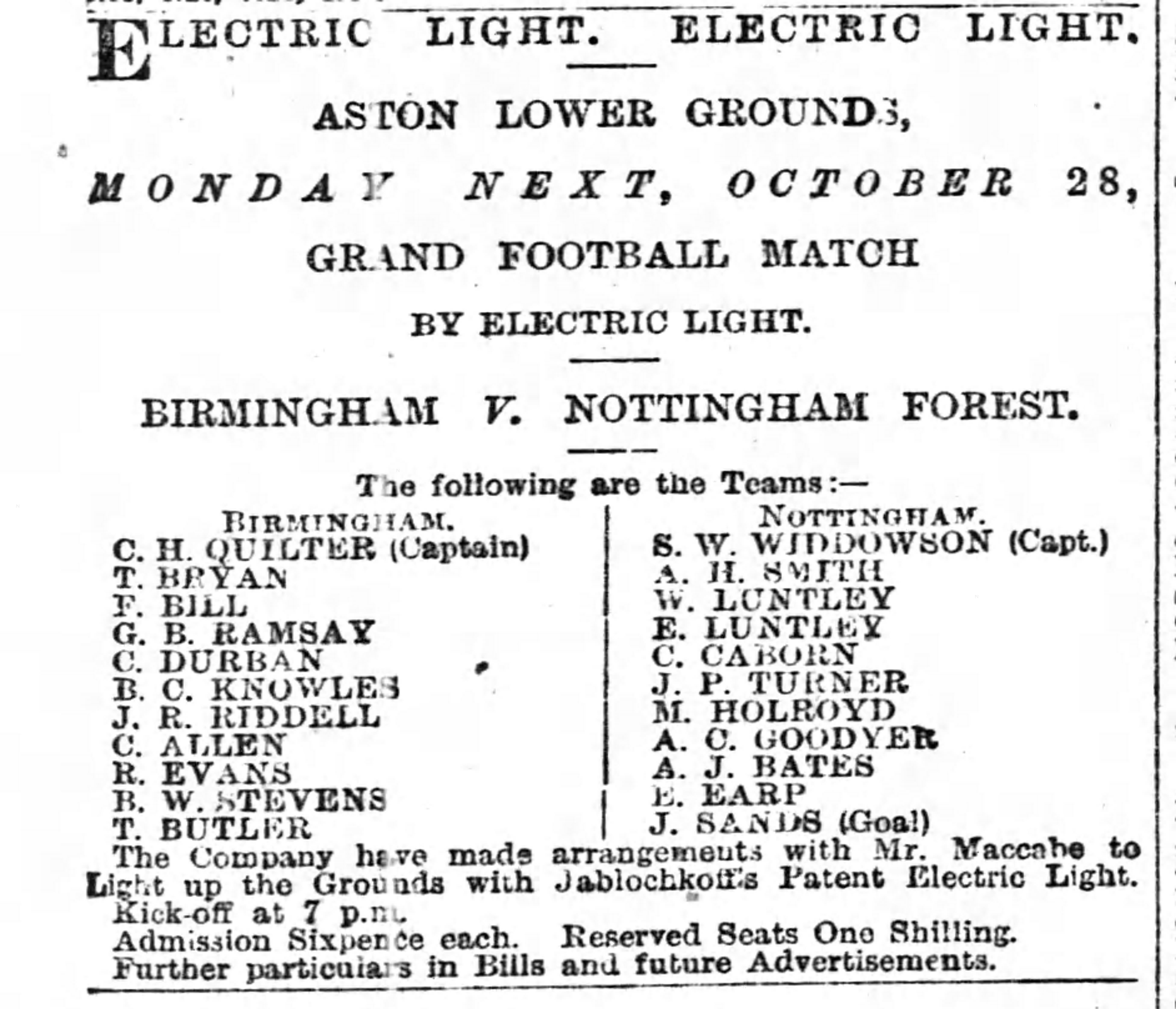
Advert for floodlit football match between Birmingham and Nottingham Forest, Birmingham Daily Post, 25 October 1878

The club was formed by C. H. Quilter, the owner and operator of the Lower Grounds amusement park and gardens, out of players from the Aston United cricket club, in part as an extra attraction for visitors, but also to keep the players together over the winter. The members were persuaded to adopt football by "a Sheffielder called Webster"; many of its players were Quilter's employees at the Lower Grounds. Quilter himself was a regular player for the club.

The club gave its foundation date as 1875 although there is at least one reported match from the previous year, against the Birmingham Clerks Association club. By 1877 the club boasted 150 members and, although its first game was to association rules, it was joined the Sheffield Football Association in 1874 and played some matches to the Sheffield rules. In 1876 the club was the first from outside the city to beat Sheffield F.C., doing so by one goal to nil; in the season the club played 20, and won 8, drew 5, and lost 5, the other 2 matches presumably being inter-club games.

The club also experimented with rugby union rules, but, after the death of Wilcox in a match against Derby Rugby Club in March 1876, refused to engage any further such fixtures.

The club's original secretary, Cofield, was one of the founders of St George's, and became the first secretary of the Birmingham Football Association - however the BC&FC stood aloof from it, believing that "we were quite able to hold our own". This meant that the club's first competitive football came in the 1877–78 Sheffield Association Cup, hosting Exchange F.C. at the Aston Lower Grounds. The Exchange won the toss, which proved crucial, as it played with a heavy wind behind it in the first half; for the second half the wind had died down. Exchange duly won 3–0, the first goal being heartily disputed by Birmingham on the basis of a foul in the build-up.

The B.C.C. experimented with playing under floodlighting in 1878, by hosting a match at the Lower Grounds against Nottingham Forest illuminated by "Jablockoff Electric Lights". The experiment was not a success owing to the weather - a pre-match storm destroyed a number of lights, and another storm during the match caused its abandonment.

The club entered the FA Cup in 1879–80, being drawn against Panthers, who withdrew, in the first round, and losing 6–0 at home to Oxford University in the second, after holding the university to 1–0 at half-time, but having to play an hour of the match with ten men after Nicholls broke his collarbone. The crowd of 4-500 was considered "very small" and blamed on the "intense cold", as it contrasted with the 6,000 at the Lower Grounds the previous week for the match between the Birmingham Football Association and Scotland.

The club was the most active in the Midlands, winning 20 of 39 games in 1878–79, but it only ever played three competitive matches - its only match in the Birmingham Senior Cup was in 1879, a 4–1 defeat to Saltley College, the Collegians scoring three late goals as Birmingham tired. Although the club held athletics events at the Lower Grounds until September 1880, its final scheduled fixture was against Saltley College in April 1880, and it did not take place as the college was playing in the Senior Cup final on the due date. The club's failure to join the Birmingham Association had proved costly as Aston Villa - to the club's surprise - had usurped it by 1879, and its staunch amateur stance also cost it players.

The Lower Grounds were made available to other clubs from the 1880–81 season. This may have been connected with financial difficulties for the Quilters, requiring a benefit event in October to make up for the "very considerable loss".

== Colours ==
The club's colours were described red, or scarlet, and blue jerseys and stockings, which probably refers to the design being hoops. The Cup tie against Oxford University however saw some of the Birmingham players wearing "a diversity of dress" which confused the spectators and led to the media demanding players wear the registered colours.

== Notable players ==
- Howard Vaughton, future England international while playing for Aston Villa
- George Tait, future England international while playing for Birmingham Excelsior F.C.
