= Harry Mitchell (disambiguation) =

Harry Mitchell (1940–2026) was an American politician who was a member of the U.S. House of Representatives.

Harry Mitchell may also refer to:

- Harry Mitchell (boxer) (1898–1983), English boxer
- Harry Mitchell (brewer) (1862–1894), managing director of Mitchells & Butlers Brewery
- Harry Mitchell (musician), Australian jazz pianist
- Harry Mitchell, a character in 52 Pick-Up
- Harry Mitchell, a character in The Adjustment Bureau
- Harry Mitchell, a character in EastEnders

== See also ==
- Harold Mitchell (disambiguation)
- Henry Mitchell (disambiguation)
