= Mitchells & Butlers Brewery =

Brewery in Cape Hill, Smethwick, England

Mitchells & Butlers
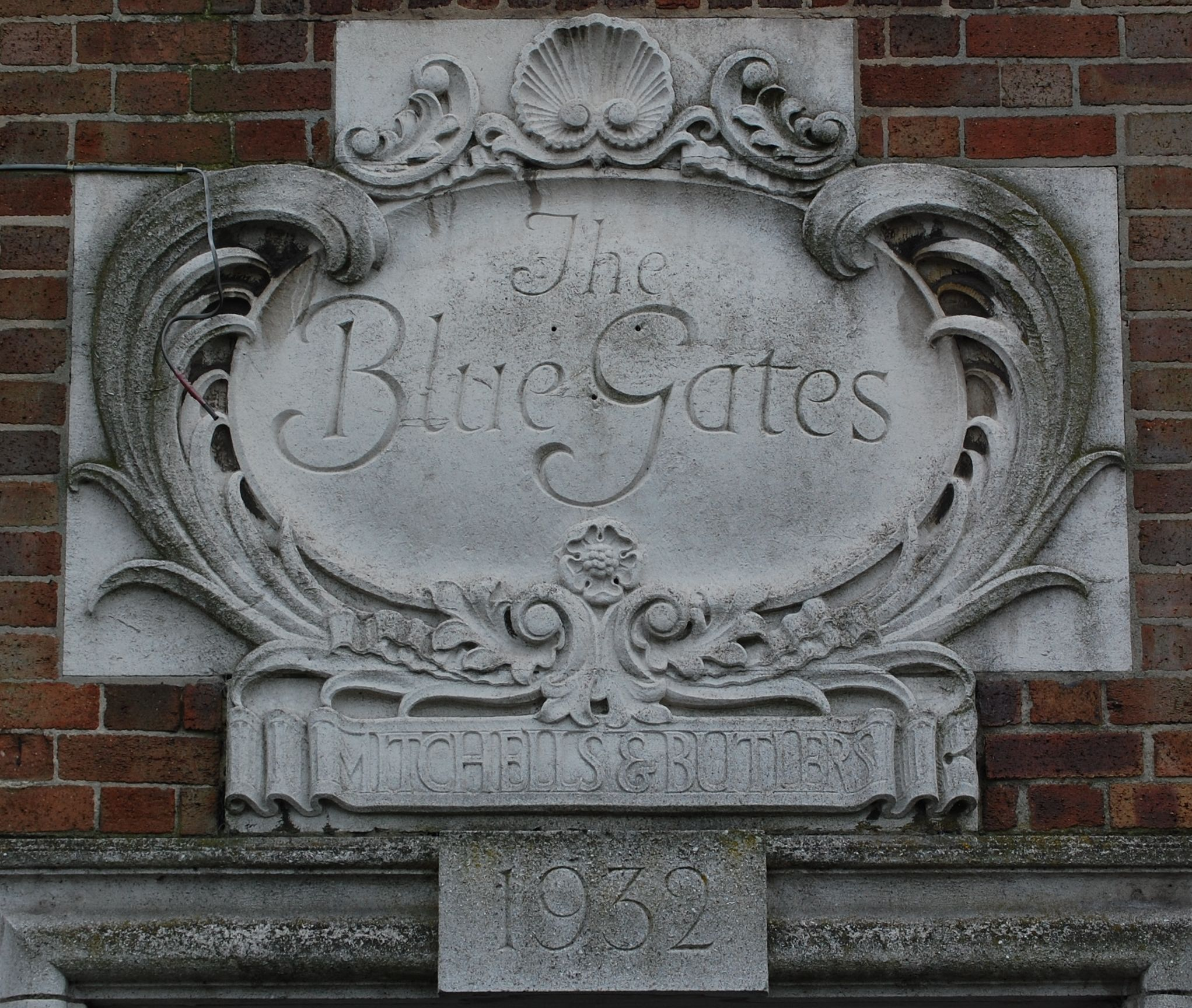
- Mitchells & Butlers brand over the door of the 1932 Blue Gates pub, Smethwick

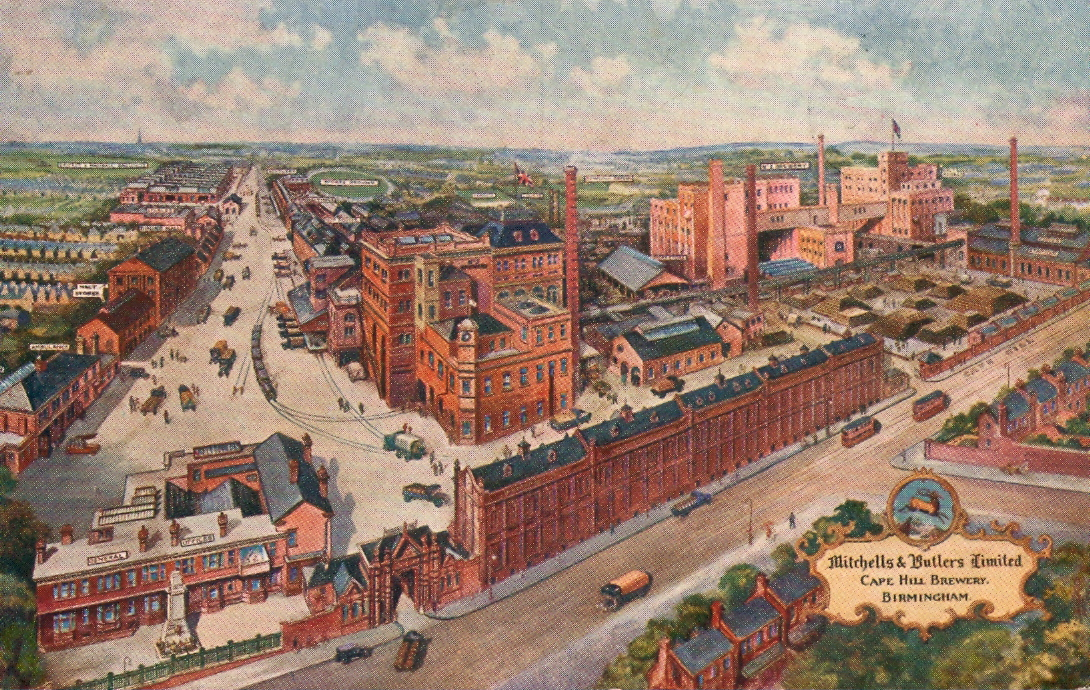
- The Cape Hill brewery, on a 1925 postcard
- Industry: Brewing
- Founded: 1898
- Defunct: 1961
- Fate: Merged with Bass
- Headquarters: Cape Hill, Smethwick, England; 52.4872°N 1.9508°W

Mitchells & Butlers Brewery was formed when Henry Mitchell's old Crown Brewery (founded in Smethwick in 1866, and in partnership with Herbert Glendilling Bainbridge, former partner in Young's and Bainbridge from 1888) merged with William Butler's Brewery (also founded in Smethwick in 1866) in 1898.

== Mitchells ==
Henry Mitchell had moved to the Cape Hill site in 1879 and this became the company's main brewing site. It had its own railway network, connected to the national railway system from 1907 to 1962, via the Harborne line. The brewery also funded a football team, Birmingham St George's F.C., which was a member of the Football Alliance and won the Staffordshire Senior Cup twice, before disbanding in 1892.

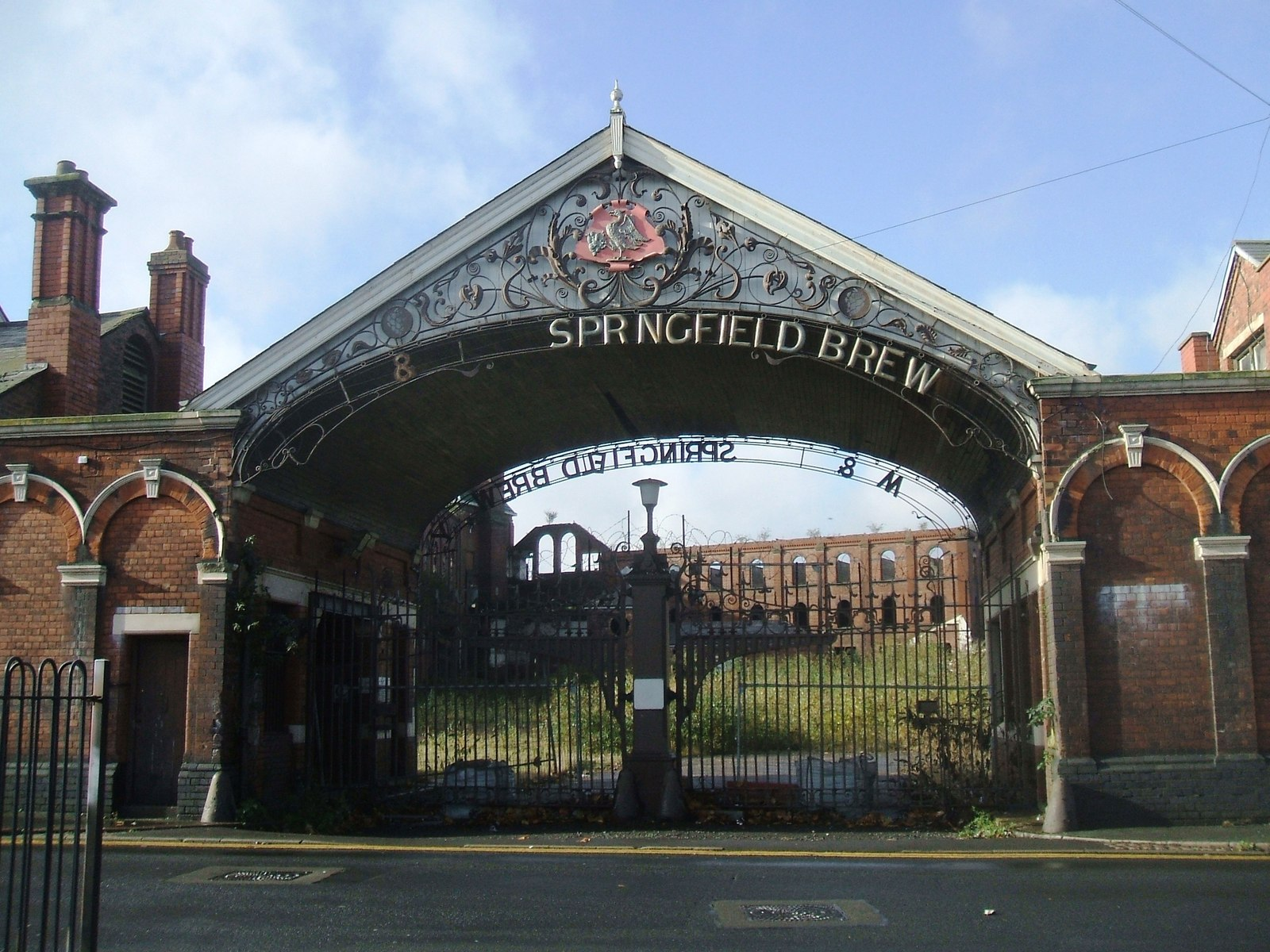
The derelict Springfield Brewery, seen through its entrance arch in 2013

== Butlers ==
Another brewery, opened by a completely different William Butler, in 1874, at Springfield in Wolverhampton, also became part of M&B in 1960. Brewing at this site ceased in 1990 and the site closed in 1991. It was badly damaged by fire in 2004. The site is now occupied by a campus of the University of Wolverhampton, with some original buildings, including the ornate entrance arch, retained.

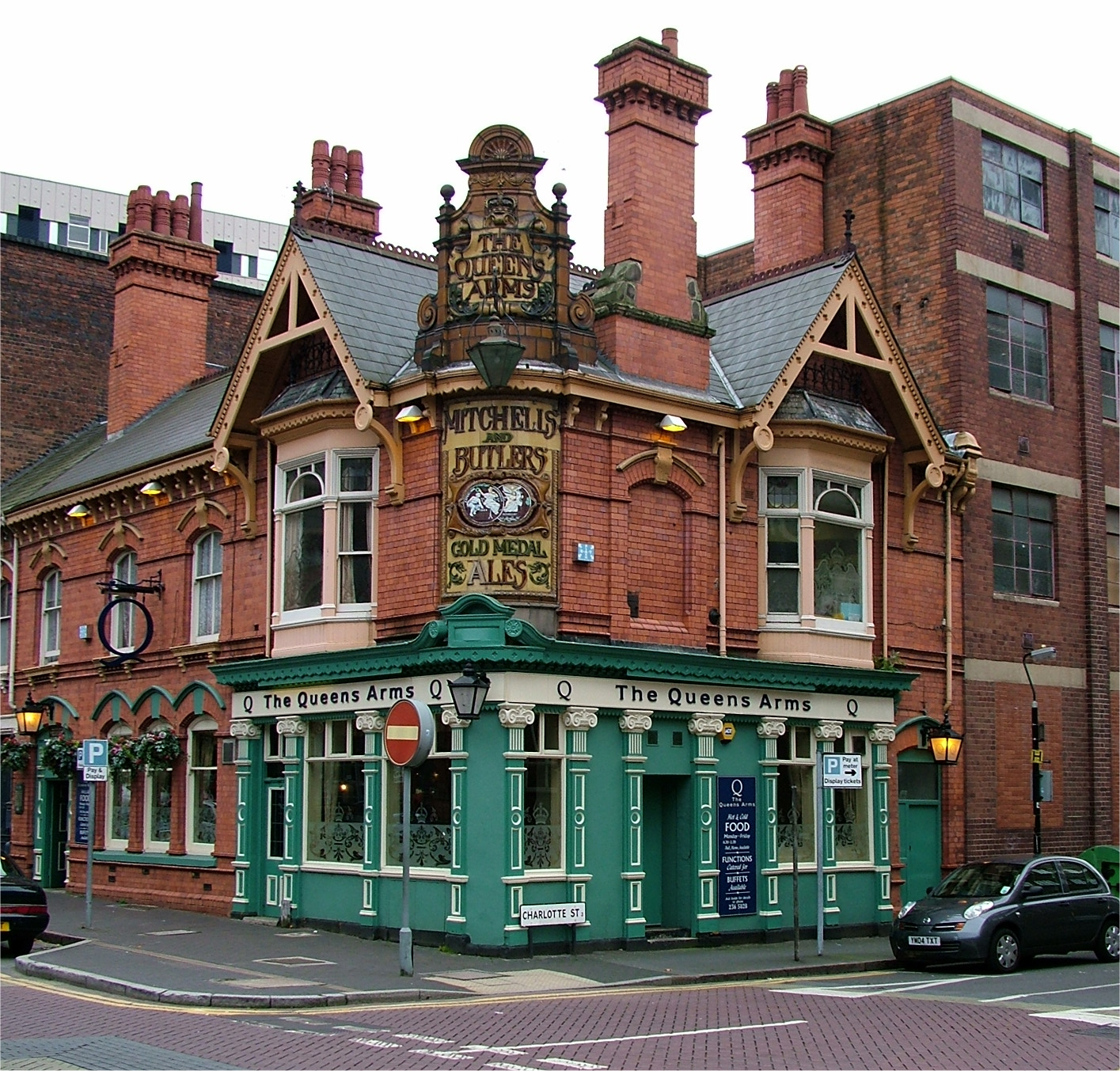
An original Mitchells & Butlers Brewery pub, The Queens Arms, in central Birmingham

Other acquisitions included Holder's Brewers, who owned Birmingham's Midland Brewery, in 1919, and the Highgate & Walsall Brewery in 1939.

== Merger with Bass ==
The company merged with Bass in 1961. With the brand under ownership of Coors Brewers, the Cape Hill brewery closed in 2002 with production switched to Burton upon Trent. The brewery was demolished in 2005, and the site is now a housing estate, although the Mitchell & Butler war memorial, built in 1920, has been retained and restored.

Their most famous beer was Brew XI (using Roman numerals, and so pronounced Brew Eleven), advertised with the slogan "for the men of the Midlands". It is now brewed under licence for Coors by Brains of Cardiff.

A descendant company, which manages pubs, bars and restaurants throughout the United Kingdom, is still known as Mitchells & Butlers, and is based in Birmingham.

== See also ==
- List of breweries in Birmingham
