= Harold Mitchell =

Harold Mitchell may refer to:

- Sir Harold Mitchell, 1st Baronet (1900–1983), British businessman and politician
- Harold Mitchell (media buyer) (1942–2024), Australian entrepreneur, media buyer, philanthropist and humanitarian
- Harold Mitchell (Newfoundland politician) (1891–1952), member of the Newfoundland House of Assembly
- Harold Mitchell Jr. (born 1965), member of the South Carolina House of Representatives
- Harold C. Mitchell (1872–1938), American lawyer and politician from New York
- Harold Mitchell (A Streetcar Named Desire), a character in A Streetcar Named Desire
- Harry Mitchell (boxer) (1898–1983), English boxer

== See also ==
- Harry Mitchell (disambiguation)
