= Oliver Whateley =

English footballer (1861–1926)

Personal information
- Date of birth: 8 August 1861
- Place of birth: Birmingham, England
- Date of death: October 1926 (aged 65)
- Position: Inside forward

Senior career*
Years	Team	Apps	(Gls)
1880–1888	Aston Villa	19	(10)

International career
1883	England	2	(2)
- * Club domestic league appearances and goals

Oliver Whateley (8 August 1861 – October 1926) was an English footballer who played as an inside forward.

== Career ==
Born in Birmingham, Whateley played for Aston Villa, and earned two caps for England in 1883.

He debuted for Villa as a 20-year-old on 5 November 1881.
