= William Siddons =

English footballer

Personal information
- Full name: William Henry Siddons
- Date of birth: Quarter 3 1864
- Place of birth: West Bromwich, England
- Date of death: 1893 (aged 28–29)
- Position: Full back

Senior career*
Years	Team	Apps	(Gls)
1884-1885	Aston Villa		(0)
1885-1886	Birmingham Excelsior		(0)
1886-1888	Mitchell St. George's		(0)
1888	Bolton Wanderers	1	(0)
1889–1891	Birmingham St. George's		
1891–1892	Darwen	16	(1)
1892–1893	Walsall Town Swifts	4	(0)
- * Club domestic league appearances and goals

William Henry Siddons (Quarter 3 1864 – 1893) was an English footballer who played in the Football League for Bolton Wanderers, Darwen and Walsall Town Swifts. He had also been a regular with Birmingham St George's. He died of congestion of the kidneys on 4 February 1893, aged just 29, having played for Redditch F.C. against Stourbridge F.C. the month before.

== Early career ==
The earliest reference to Siddons playing football is from 1877, when he was turning out for Holte Wanderers against Walsall Alma.

By 1884, Siddons had signed for Aston Villa. In 1885, he signed for Birmingham Excelsior, and left for Birmingham St George's in 1888, and, in 1891, after the Dragons' funding was cut, Siddons headed North to Bolton Wanderers and played in Football League.
