= Harry Mitchell (brewer) =

English brewer (1862–1894)

Captain Henry Mitchell Junior
- Born: 11 September 1862; Smethwick, Staffordshire, England
- Died: 1894 (aged 32)
- Monuments: Harry Mitchell Park
- Occupation: Managing Director
- Parent: Henry Mitchell (father)

Captain Henry Mitchell Jr. (1862–1894) was an English brewer who was the managing director of a company co-founded by his father Henry Mitchell. He was also superintendent of the fire brigade at the company's Cape Hill brewery, and a captain in the Smethwick Rifle Volunteers.

He founded a brewery football team, Mitchells St George's, later Birmingham St George's F.C.

Mitchell was born on 11 September 1862, in Smethwick (then part of Staffordshire), and died from typhoid fever at the age of just 32.

== Memorials ==
In 1897 Henry Mitchell purchased 14 acres (5.7 ha) of land, and in 1899 presented this to the Smethwick Corporation to form what was named in his son's memory "Harry's Park" (now known as "Harry Mitchell Park").

Henry also built and donated Smethwick Drill Hall and the accompanying Sergeant Instructor's house. A plaque from the drill hall, now in the Harry Mitchell Leisure Centre which replaced it, reads:

This drill hall
for use of the Smethwick Volunteers
and the surrounding recreation grounds
called 'Harry's Park' were presented to
the inhabitants of Smethwick in memory of
Captain Henry Mitchell
of the Smethwick Rifle Volunteers and
Cape Hill Brewery Fire Brigade
born at Smethwick September
11th 1862
