= Birmingham St George's F.C. =

Former association football club in Birmingham, England

Birmingham St. George's F.C.
- Full name: Birmingham St. George's Football Club
- Nickname: The Dragons
- Founded: 1875
- Dissolved: 1892
- Ground: Cape Hill Brewery
- Capacity: c. 12,000
- Chairman: Harry Mitchell Jr
Home colours	Away colours

Birmingham St. George's F.C. was a football club based in Smethwick, England. The club started as St George's FC in Aston, before moving to the Cape Hill brewery in 1886 under the name Mitchell St George's.

The club's origin was in two separate clubs: Mitchells Brewery FC, a club claiming a foundation date of 1873, being the works side of the Mitchells Brewery; and St George's FC, a club founded in 1875, and based at The Basin, Fentham Road in Aston.

== St George's ==
St George's was founded under the instigation of Cofield, the secretary of the Birmingham Cricket & Football Club, and it was active within the Birmingham & District Football Association, being a founder member - with Cofield being nominated secretary of the Association as well - in late 1875.

One of the first games for St George's was against Aston Villa in December 1875. Aston Park became available to the public for recreation, and this led to several new clubs being founded in the district and by 1877, around twenty clubs shared the footballing areas. St. Georges competed for space with Westminsters, Harold, Florence, Forward, Excelsior and other short lived outfits. St. Georges moved to a ground at Fentham Road at the end of 1877, near the junction with Birchfield Road, and was notable for sloping downhill from the spectator entrance end; it was also known as "the Basin" from its tendency to flood. In the days before goal-nets, the lower goal was backed by boards. When St. Georges departed Fentham Road, sister club Excelsior moved in, and after their demise following mass departures to Villa and Mitchell St. Georges, Aston Victoria became Fentham Road occupiers in the 1890s.

The club entered the first Birmingham Senior Cup in 1876, losing in a second replay in the first round to Cannock at the Bott Lane ground in Walsall. The following year it lost 2–0 to Aston Villa, who, at the time, were still an amateur club. The club's first significant run in the competition came in 1878–79, losing to Walsall Swifts in the quarter-finals of the competition, in front of 750 spectators at Fentham Road.

The club made its FA Cup debut in 1881–82, but was hammered 9–0 at Wednesbury Old Athletic in the first round, conceding the first goal after two minutes. It recorded its first win in the competition the following season, this time the Dragons scoring within a minute of the start, en route to a 5–1 home win over Calthorpe.

=== First silverware ===
The club's first trophy success came in 1883–84, when it beat West Bromwich Albion in the final of the Staffordshire Cup. Albion were favourites for the game, being the defending champions, and having reached the semi-finals of the Birmingham Senior Cup; however the Dragons won 2–1 in front of 5,500 spectators at the Victoria Ground. The winning goal came when Albion goalkeeper Roberts caught a shot from Denny Hodgetts, but Tommy Green charged him and the ball through the goalposts by several yards. Albion signed Green shortly afterwards.

=== Reputation growth ===
The club's growing reputation was demonstrated by it being the first Birmingham opponents of Preston North End, holding the Lancashire side to a 2–2 draw at Fentham Road in October 1884. 1884–85 proved the club's best season yet, as the club beat the Albion again in the Birmingham Senior Cup, and reached the third round of the FA Cup. The highlight of the Cup run was the fastest-ever hat-trick in a match, Tommy Green scoring three in four minutes against Aston Unity. The club went out to Walsall Swifts in controversial circumstances. Despite losing midfielder Barton to injury in the first few minutes, the Dragons took a 2–0 lead at half-time, but conceded an own goal soon after the change of ends, and, with 25 minutes to go and the score 2–2, the referee - a Mr Willison of Wednesbury Old Athletic - allowed a goal for the Swifts which the Dragons claimed had not crossed the line. St George's left the pitch and protested to the FA but the protest was dismissed.

== Mitchell St George's ==
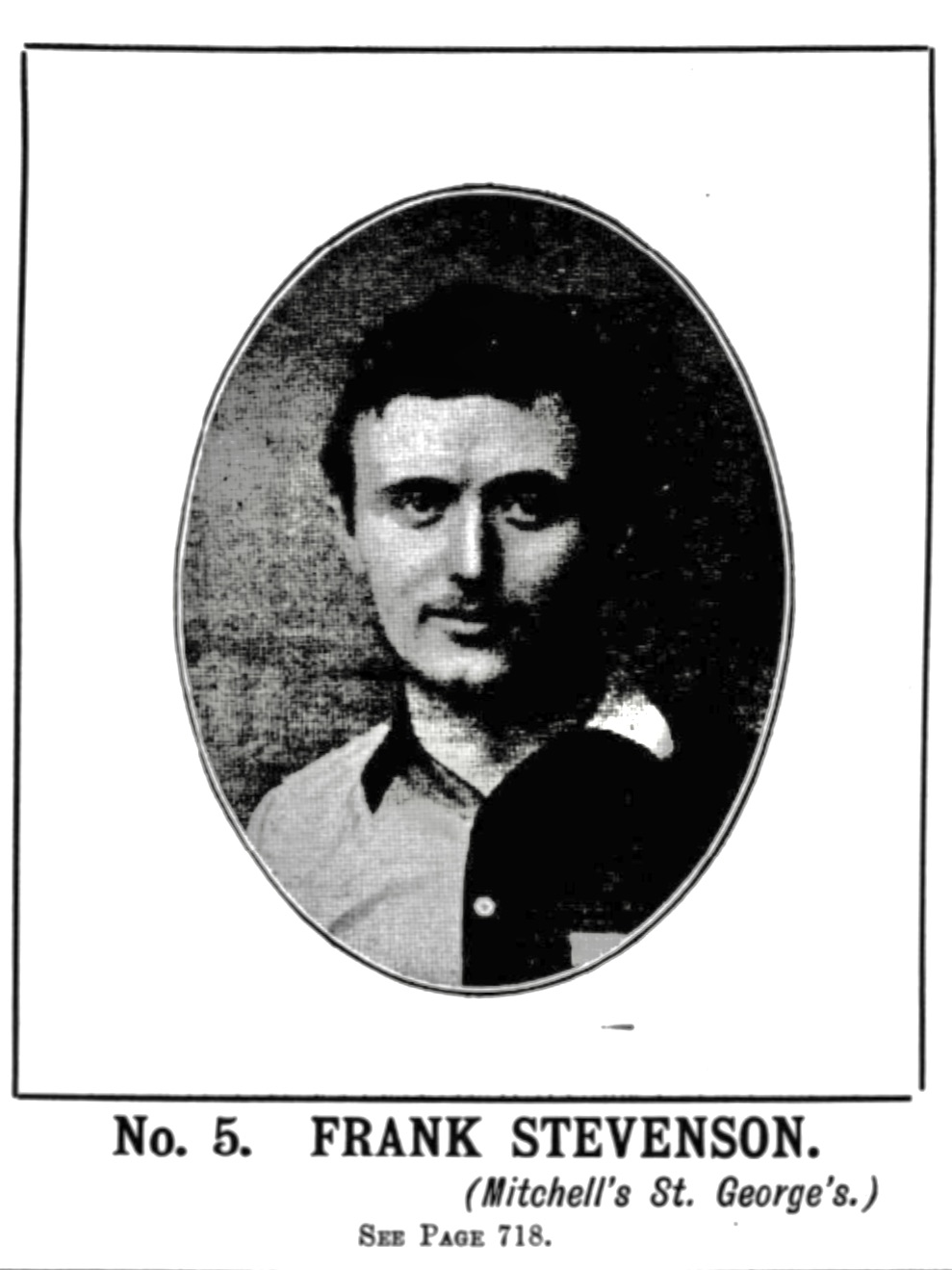
Frank Stevenson, captain of the club in the mid-1880s, from the Midland Athlete, 8 November 1886

As the Football Association legalized professionalism in 1885, St George's faced the same problems as other teams in the Aston area, namely being able to retain players when Villa, having been illegally professional over previous seasons and having considerable financial backing, were now able openly to attract players from other local clubs; this problem was exacerbated by the FA Cup rules on residency, meaning St George's were competing with Aston Unity and Birmingham Excelsior, as well as Villa, for a limited pool of players.

However, at the start of the 1885–86 season, rather than stay in Aston, the club received an offer from Harry Mitchell, son of the owner of the Cape Hill brewery, to move from the north to the west of Birmingham; the connection came via goalkeeper Harry Stansbie, who was a cellarman at the brewery. Mitchell became the club president and arranged for the club to take over the facilities of the brewery team (which had never entered any competition of note), in particular the athletics stadium at the brewery which was being re-built, the club changing its name in his honour. It is likely that Mitchell had been funding the team in the preceding years, as in 1882 the Birmingham FA took action against St George's for playing Green and Hodgetts, both of whom had been paid for playing for Great Lever in Lancashire earlier in the year, and so were illegal professionals.

The ground was not ready for the new season, so the club spent 1885–86 playing their home games at the Bellefield ground (the home of the G. K. Nettlefold works side) in Winson Green, Birmingham. The advantage of the move was that the club was less susceptible to losing players to Villa, and the brewery could employ players in sinecure jobs to enable them to play for the club as professionals; however, the club was now geographically close to West Bromwich Albion, which was also enjoying heavy financial backing, from the Salters engineering company.

The move was also too late for the club to retain the services of Denny Hodgetts, who had played for the club since 1881 and had scored five goals for the club in the FA Cup. Hodgetts moved to Villa in 1886 and scored for them in the Cup final the following year.

=== Formal merger of St George's and Mitchells ===
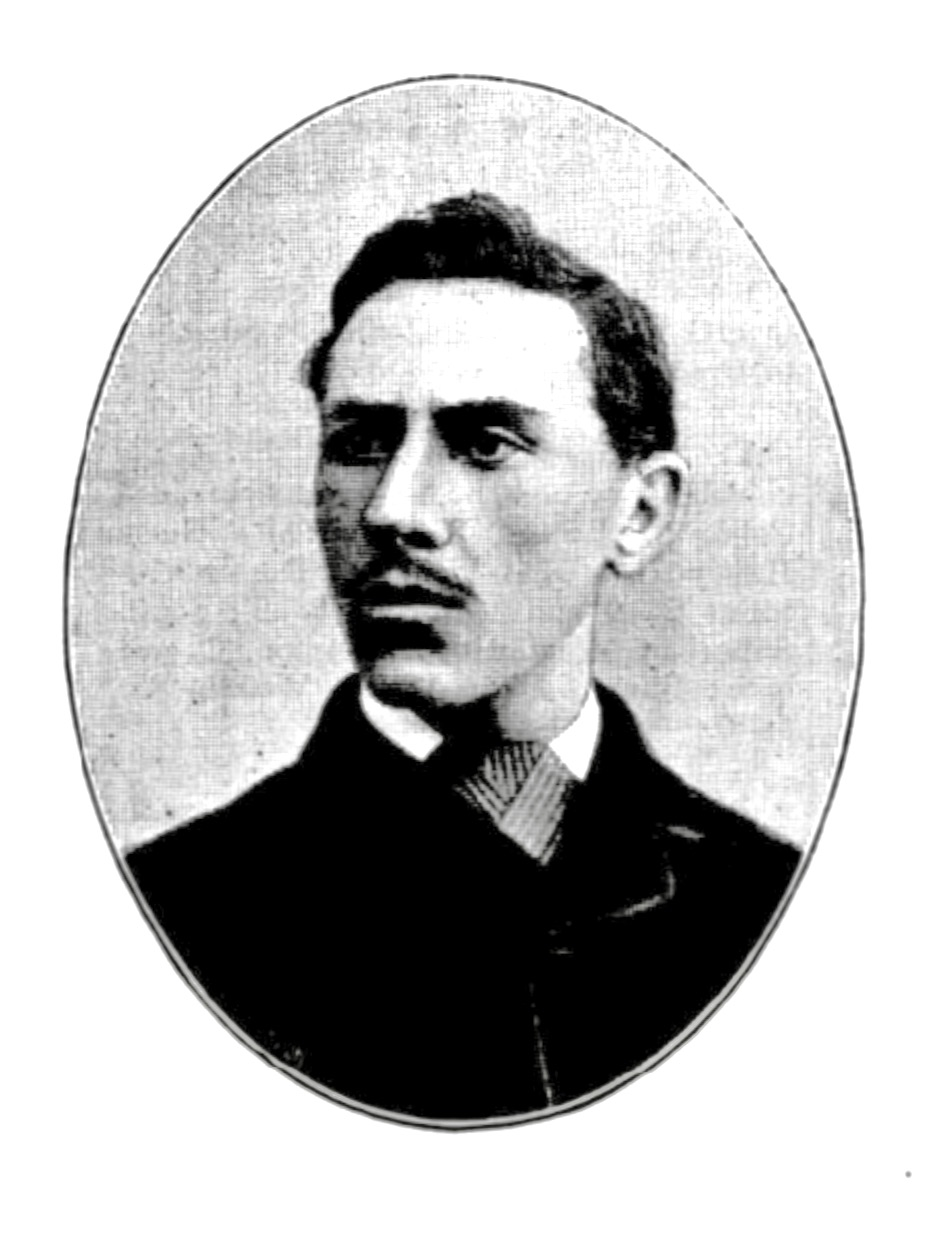
Arthur Bailey, St George's half-back, pictured soon after his move from Excelsior, 1886

At the start of the 1886–87 season, the brewery side and the St George's clubs formally merged, under the name Mitchell's St George's. The impetus seems to have been significant debts for St George's, of over £100, which Harry Mitchell cleared.

The resulting influx of brewery money, and players including two players from Excelsior, one from Small Heath Alliance, and one from Wolverhampton Wanderers, improved the side, which was described as a "rare team" likely to "take a position in the front ranks".

The Cape Hill ground was ready for 1886–87, and considered one of the finest pitches in the country, its disadvantage being a lack of suitable stands. The club was unlucky in the FA Cup and the Birmingham Senior Cup, being drawn against West Bromwich Albion, by now one of the top sides in the country, in both; the Albion were runners-up in the latter and winners of the former.

=== Misfortune in the FA Cup ===
The club was particularly unlucky in its FA Cup quarter-final, played at the neutral venue of the Aston Lower Grounds. The Dragons dominated the second half, had what spectators thought was a good claim to a goal disallowed, and lost to a freak goal in the 83rd minute after Harry Stansbie slipped in heavy snow while trying to clear the ball, and Albion's Woodhall, following up, put in a high shot that most spectators thought had gone over the bar, but which was awarded as a goal. On the referee accepting the Albion claim, the Albion umpire "danced about the field in the most frantic manner". The Dragons put in a protest which the FA dismissed "with such haste...that precludes a thorough sifting of the matter." In a sign of potential problems, however, the club's AGM heard that the club had incurred "very heavy expenses", although for the moment "the balance sheet showed an account on the right side".

== Birmingham St George's ==
=== Exclusion from the Football League ===
Despite a lack of silverware, by 1888 the club had a strong reputation, the Birmingham Daily Post in May 1888 declaring the club to be one of the four best teams in the Midlands (the others being Aston Villa, West Bromwich Albion, and Wolverhampton Wanderers, all of whom would be founder members of the Football League). The club was also invited to take part in the Derby County Charity Cup at the end of the 1887–88 season, and duly won the trophy, beating Derby County 3–2 in the semi-final at the County Ground and Notts Rangers 2–1 in the final at the same venue; the club would reach the semi-final the following season.

Nevertheless, the club was not invited to the new League; William McGregor, Aston Villa's secretary, decreeing that each town could only send one club to the League, thereby excluding the Dragons. Even though the club was technically based in Smethwick rather than Aston or Birmingham, the club was often referred to as a Birmingham club, with newspapers sometimes referring to the team as a Birmingham team and players as "the Brums" [sic]. Consequently, although Bolton Wanderers suggested that the Dragons be invited to join, the club missed out, which, in the longer term, proved to be the club's death knell.

=== The Combination and further rejection ===
Because of this exclusion, the club became one of the founder members of the Combination, an alternative to the Football League for those clubs excluded from it, Harry Mitchell becoming the Combination's president. At the start of the season the club also removed the "Mitchells" from its name, "because of the Limited Liability Act, it is said"; the club was afterwards habitually known as Birmingham St George's in an attempt to widen the supporter base. The club had high hopes for the combination season, having retained the players from 1887–88, and recruiting several new players, including Billy Siddons and recruits from Aston Shakespeare. The Combination however disbanded after a season because of a lack of proper central organization in arranging fixtures. Each of the 20 clubs was to arrange 16 fixtures, in order to leave dates free for FA and local cup matches, but, by April, many teams had failed to reach the target and the Combination fizzled out. The Dragons had played the required games, with a record of 6 wins, 6 draws, and 4 defeats, the highlight being a 10–1 win over Notts Rangers on 12 January 1889.

At the end of the 1888–89 season, the Dragons applied to become members of League. Notwithstanding McGregor's franchise recommendation, and in part due to support from William Sudell of Preston North End, the club gained 5 votes at the League's annual A.G.M., 2 behind Notts County, who (along with the other of the bottom four teams) had to seek re-election to the League; the bottom four teams were all allowed to vote in the election, which resulted in them all "vot[ing] themselves in again" - 6 of the 12 ballots were simply to return the bottom four.

=== Football Alliance ===
The clubs which had lost out in the Football League vote formed an alternative league competition, the Football Alliance, which was more successful than the Combination by being more on Football League lines.

Crowds were lower than those of Football League clubs, not helped by the club having increased ticket prices to cope with the increased expenditure, and, with League clubs having their calendars tied up almost exclusively in playing other League clubs, St George's had lost access to lucrative friendlies against their closest rivals. There was some compensation in that those that did attend did so with "boisterous enthusiasm" and the local media boasting the crowd to be the loudest in football however the same media also warned that the lack of income from spectators could leave the club "in a bad position".

One other problem for the club was that on-pitch violence in matches with Aston Villa had been so prevalent that the clubs had agreed never to meet again; when the clubs were forced to meet at Cape Hill in the Birmingham Senior Cup on 8 February 1890, the attendance (variously given as 8,500 or "over 10,000") was the second-highest of the season. Significantly, the only attendance to beat that in the season was not an Alliance match, but in the FA Cup, against Notts County. The Dragons' highest Alliance attendance in the season (and the club's highest attendance for a home Alliance fixture) was 5,000, i.e. less than half, for the derby against Small Heath Alliance.

There was controversy regarding the club's game with Sunderland Albion on 4 January 1890. The club won 5–3, but the Alliance ordered the match to be replayed, on the basis that the referee had not played the full 90 minutes. St George's refused to replay the fixture, so the Alliance annulled the result and awarded 2 points to Albion. The result would have put St George's second in the table, but the club slipped back after a run of four defeats and a draw in five games March and April. The club agreed with Walsall Town Swifts, its opponents in both the final game of the season and in the Staffordshire Cup Final, to have the final stand as a match for the Alliance as well. Played at the Wednesbury Oval in front of 4,000 spectators, the Dragons came from 3–2 down at half-time to win 5–3 and secure their final trophy.

There was also controversy in the FA Cup, the club reaching the first round and being given the opportunity to gain some revenge on Notts County. In a replay, County won 6–2, but St George's protested on the basis that a County player (John Clements) played an illegal match under an assumed name.

1890–91 saw the Dragons' best season in the Alliance, finishing fourth of the twelve clubs, including beating champions Stoke 5–2. The club's ill-luck in the FA Cup with West Bromwich Albion continued; in the second round tie with the Albion, after the Dragons dominated the early part of the game, McGuffie was forced to leave the field after being elbowed in the face by Siddons, and the club lost 3–0.

Even though the club was pushing for the Alliance title towards the end of the season - in mid-March, the Dragons were second in the table, seven points behind Stoke, but with three games in hand - the club's crowds were poor. The crowd for the home game with Darwen attracted "exceptionally few" spectators, just 800 watched the penultimate home game with Crewe Alexandra, and the highest home crowd was a mere 2,000 for the derbies with Walsall and Small Heath; no side had a lower average attendance. The club's falling away towards the end of the season was in part due to leading scorer Jack Devey signing for Aston Villa, news of which broke in February, which led to Devey being abused by the home support - the Dragons refused to play him in the final Alliance matches. Devey was absent for the club's loss in the semi-final of the Staffordshire Cup to Aston Villa, and the club played the match in effect with ten men, as McVickers was injured in the early stages and a passenger for the remainder.

=== Brewery ceasing support ===
Despite the promising 1890–91 League season, the club was in serious financial difficulties. In order to raise funds, Mitchell proposed that the club become a limited liability company, and £426 was promised in contributions, £100 coming from Mitchell and his father. However, with only £320 actually received and the legal expenses likely to be around £60, the resolution was rescinded, the club instead trying to raise money via a season ticket fund.

At the end of the season, the brewery announced that it would sever its connection with the club. Perhaps as a result of this, the club did not apply to join the Football League, even though Darwen, who had finished two places below them in the Alliance, did so successfully.

To soften the blow, the brewery allowed free use of the ground at Cape Hill, and both Henry Mitchell Sr and Jr would contribute £50 each per year. However the club "literally had no money" and without the brewery support it was unable to compete with the professional clubs of the Alliance.

=== Final season ===
The Dragons lost key players before the start of the season. The club had already lost Jack Devey to Villa, and now lost George Kinsey to Wolves; John McVicker to Accrington; John Castle to West Brom; Ted Hadley to Burton Swifts; and William Siddons, only recently recruited from Villa, to Darwen F.C. In Devey and Hadley, the Dragons had lost their leading scorer and regular goalkeeper respectively, and the other players were all first-choice starters.

The long-standing club secretary William Stainsbie also resigned and was replaced by a Mr Hobson, who forgot to register one player (Matthews) and forgot to send the registration of another player (McGuffie) to the Alliance the required seven days before the start of the season, with the result that, on 5 September 1891, at Walsall Town Swifts, the club fielded both players when neither was eligible. Although the Dragons won 3–1, they were deducted the two points gained, and fined £5.

The depleted side finished bottom of the Alliance, four points adrift of Walsall. The club conceded 29 goals in its final 5 away matches. A measure of the lack of support the club had is shown by the away derby at Small Heath attracting 3,000 spectators, but the home game two months later only attracting 500; similarly, although 4,500 had turned up to the Chuckery for the first game of the season at Walsall, the return at Cape Hill a fortnight later was watched by 1,000.

The club exited both the FA Cup and Birmingham Senior Cup at the first time of asking. In the Senior Cup, the club lost to Burton Swifts 2–1, the club's goal coming in the last minute. In the FA Cup, the club was drawn away to Sunderland Albion, and both teams protested about the state of the pitch before kick-off, following a hard frost. The referee ordered the teams to play an exhibition match as he ruled the ground unfit for a Cup tie. This turned out to be a mistake on St George's part, as they won the game 2–1, but the FA upheld both teams' protest, and ordered a replay, which Albion won with ease.

At the end of the season, the other eleven clubs of the Alliance were accepted into the Football League, three of them directly into the First Division and eight (with other clubs) forming the first Second Division. The only club not to join was St George's. With significant debts, limited financial backing, ground owned by a third party, and no substantial public support, the club did not apply to join the League, and disbanded. One of the last actions of the club was to sue former player Harry Davies, who had moved to The Wednesday, for 5 guineas in overpaid wages (the club was paying him 25 shillings per match and had confused him with another Davies), as, despite selling Davies to Wednesday for £40, the wound-up club was still £60 in debt.

== Continuation of works side ==
The brewery continued its works side, under the name Mitchells & Butlers Football Club, at a regional league level, until the 1990s.

== Grounds ==
- 1875–85: Fentham Road, Aston
- 1885–86: Bellefield, Winson Green, Birmingham
- 1886–92: Cape Hill Brewery, Smethwick

== Colours ==
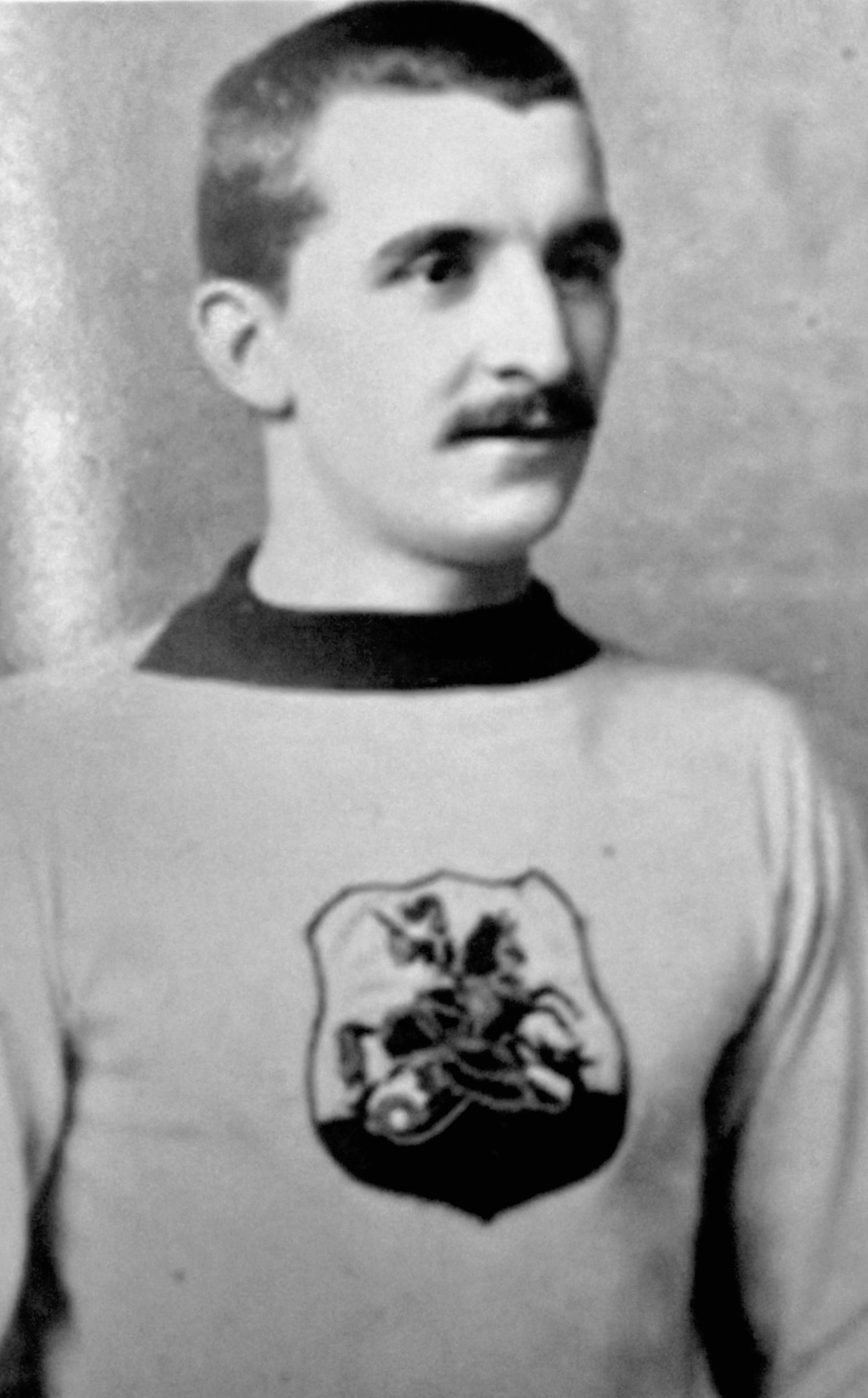
E. S. Baker, Birmingham St George's, wearing the Dragons' new 1888 jersey

The club's first colours were black shirts with a red dragon; these were changed in the early 1880s to white shirts, with a black Maltese cross badge, and black shorts. For the first match at the Bellefield ground, in the 1885–86 season, the club adopted maroon and pale blue striped jerseys.

The club was wearing white jerseys and black knickers in 1887–88, with a red change jersey. In 1888, Harry Mitchell ordered a new set of white shirts with black collars, with the new badge of a depiction of St George slaying the dragon, and a set of the colours reversed for a change kit.

The works brewery side played in dark and light blue hoops.

== Records ==
Record League win: 6–1 v Newton Heath, Football Alliance, 10 January 1891, and Walsall Town Swifts, 19 September 1891

Record League defeat: 1–11 v Crewe Alexandra, Football Alliance, 12 March 1892

Record Cup win: 16–1 v Aston Clifton, Birmingham Senior Cup, 1st round, 8 October 1887

Record Cup defeat: 0–9 v Wednesbury Old Athletic, FA Cup 1st round, 5 November 1881

Record attendance: 12,000 v Notts County, FA Cup 1st round, 18 January 1889

== Notable players ==
- Dennis Hodgetts, Jack Devey, Albert Brown, James Welford - Cup winners with Aston Villa
- Arthur Brown and Howard Vaughton - first Aston Villa internationals
- Tommy Green - twice FA Cup finalist with West Bromwich Albion, also amongst Aston Villa's first League players and scorer of their first League goal
- George Kinsey - moved to Wolverhampton Wanderers in January 1891 and later won 4 caps for England

No player received an international cap while playing for the Dragons, but Davies and Devey both represented the Football Alliance in a representative game against the Football League in April 1891, at Olive Grove, which ended in a 1-1 draw.

== Seasons ==
Season	Football Alliance								FA Cup	Birmingham Senior Cup	other honours
Season	P	W	D	L	F	A	Pts	Pos	FA Cup	Birmingham Senior Cup	other honours
1876–77	n/a								n/a	First round	
1877–78	n/a								n/a	First round	
1878–79	n/a								n/a	Quarter-final (last 6)	
1879–80	n/a								n/a	Third round	
1880–81	n/a								n/a	First round	
1881–82	n/a								First round	Second round	
1882–83	n/a								Second round	Semi-finals	
1883–84	n/a								First round	Second round	Staffordshire Cup winners
1884–85	n/a								Third round	Quarter-finals	Wednesbury Charity Cup runners-up
1885–86	n/a								First round	Third round	
1886–87	n/a								Fourth round	Second round	
1887–88	n/a								Second round	Quarter-finals	Birmingham Charity Cup runners-up Derby County Charity Cup winners
1888–89	n/a								Quarter-final	First round proper	
1889–90	21	9	3	9	62	49	21	7th	First round proper	Quarter-final	Staffordshire Cup winners
1890–91	22	12	2	8	64	62	26	4th	Second round proper	First round proper	
1891–92	22	5	3	14	34	64	11	bottom	First round proper	First round proper	
