= Cape Hill =

Area in West Midlands, England

Coordinates: 52.487°N 1.959°W

- urban area
- Location within the West Midlands
- Metropolitan borough: Sandwell
- Metropolitan county: West Midlands
- Region: West Midlands
- Country: England
- Sovereign state: United Kingdom
- Post town: SMETHWICK
- Postcode district: B66
- Dialling code: 0121
- Police: West Midlands
- Fire: West Midlands
- Ambulance: West Midlands

Cape Hill is an area of Smethwick, in the Metropolitan Borough of Sandwell, West Midlands, England, 2 3/4 miles (4.4 km) west of Birmingham City Centre. The area includes Waterloo Road near Shireland Collegiate Academy and the High Street near Victoria Park; it borders Birmingham at the A457 Dudley Road. Cape Hill is Smethwick's busiest shopping area.

== History ==
The area began to be developed in the latter part of the 19th century. Henry Mitchell bought a large plot of land alongside the road and built his brewery there in 1879. This became Mitchells & Butlers Brewery when he entered into partnership with William Butler in 1897. The brewery grounds even included a county standard cricket pitch where Worcestershire CCC played an annual match. During the 19th and early 20th centuries the area became a thriving industrial and commercial area and in the 1950s and 60s it was a centre of immigration from the Commonwealth.

Facing each other on opposite corners of Durban Road are Cape Hill Primary School and the building which was once the local dispensary. Both were constructed in red brick with terracotta facings in 1888. The school is still providing education for the local children but the dispensary is now an "at risk" Grade II Listed Building. There have been plans to turn the building into an emergency refuge for asylum seekers, a casino and a restaurant but none of these has come to fruition.

Smethwick had several cinemas which had all closed by 1970. The earliest was the Cape Electric Cinema, built in 1911. On Windmill Lane was a skating rink built in 1909, but this was sold and converted into a cinema, named the Rink Picture House in 1912. In 1928 the cinema was taken over by Denman Picture Houses, the building demolished and the current building, designed by William T Benslyn erected. It was renamed the Gaumont Cinema in 1948. In 1964, the cinema closed and the building was repurposed for a bingo hall, eventually taken over by the Mecca Bingo chain. The building was listed on 4 October 2000. It has a three-storey, 120 feet (37 m) frontage to Windmill Lane. The listing particulars describe the art-deco style auditorium as extremely wide and of double-height. The bingo club closed in 2005, and the building was used as a function hall named the Victoria Suite. The building was put up for sale in 2015; its cinema interior intact except for the removal of rows of seating. The interior was destroyed in a suspected arson attack on 4 May 2024.

== Governance ==
Cape Hill forms part of the Soho and Victoria ward for elections to Sandwell council.

== Housing ==
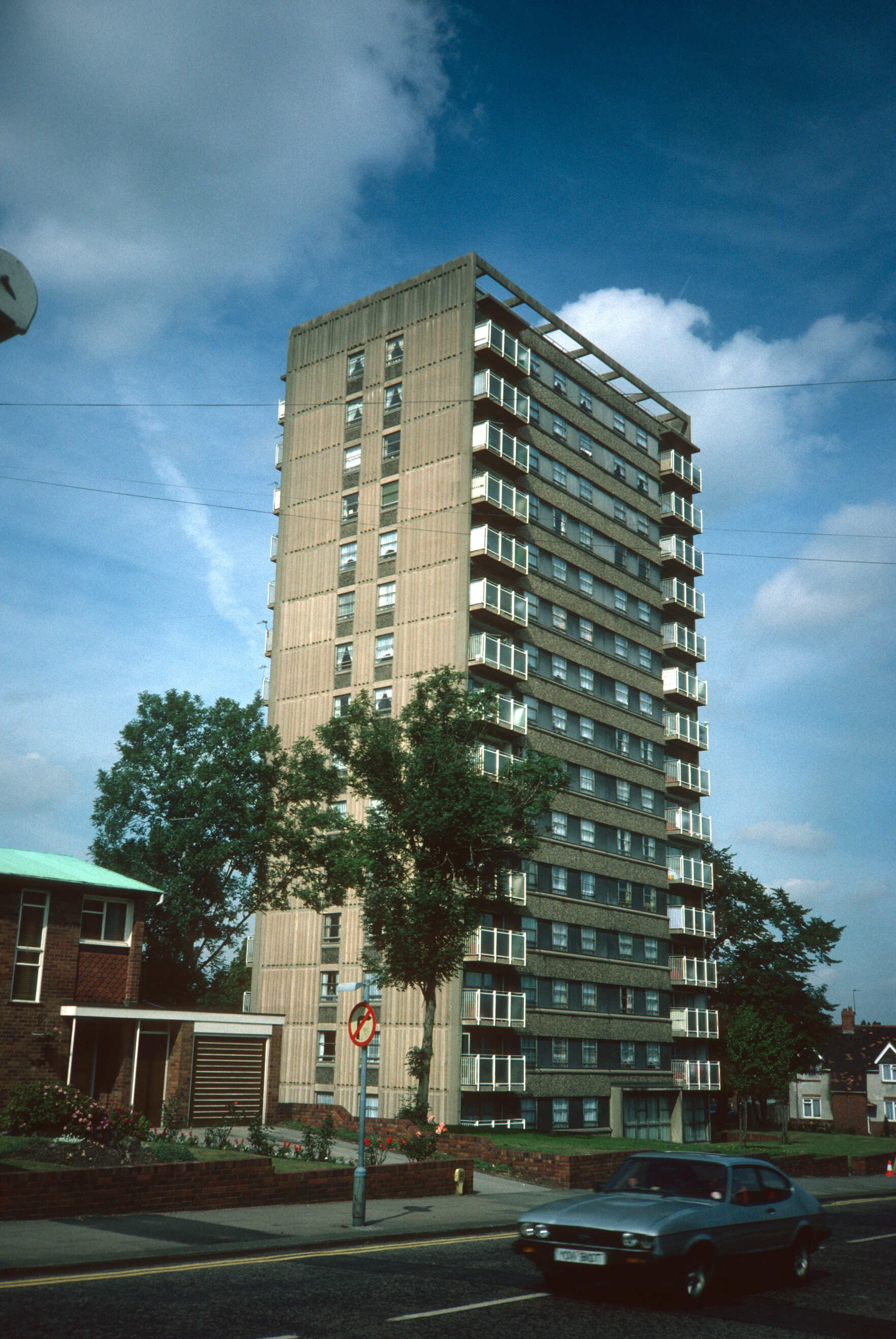
Bearwood House in 1984

Bearwood House on Bearwood Road was a 15-storey block of flats built in 1965 using the French, Sectra system, the British rights to which had been acquired by John Laing. The system made use of prefabricated steel formwork. It was reported to be the first time the method had been used in the Midlands. Bearwood House contained 89 flats each with a balcony, and had a games room in the basement. It was demolished section-by-section over a five week period in 2008.

== Schools ==
The Cape Primary School buildings date back to 1887–8. The Cape schools were opened by the Harborne and Smethwick School Board on 7 January 1888. The schools had accommodation for 250 each of boys and girls, and 389 infants. The school buildings in red brick and terracotta, under a Broseley tiled roof were designed in a "Rennaissance of Queen Anne character" in contrast to the usual 19th century Gothic style employed in local school design. A lofty bell turret was at the rear of the main entrance gable. The architect was G H Cox of Temple Street, Birmingham. An extension for a new boys' department was added in 1901.

== Shopping ==
It is a busy shopping area of mostly Asian small businesses. The Windmill Retail Park has an Asda including George, Matalan, Iceland supermarket, Boots and other high street stores.

== Transport ==
Smethwick Rolfe Street railway station is a mile away.

Bus route nos. 80 from West Bromwich, 82 from Bearwood and 87 from Dudley link Cape Hill to Birmingham City Centre. Most buses are operated by National Express West Midlands.
