= George Tait (footballer) =

English footballer (1859–1882)

Personal information
- Date of birth: 13 November 1859
- Place of birth: Birmingham, England
- Date of death: 20 November 1882 (aged 23)
- Place of death: Birmingham, England
- Position: Centre forward

Senior career*
Years	Team	Apps	(Gls)
- Birmingham Excelsior

International career
1881	England	1	(0)
- * Club domestic league appearances and goals

George Tait (13 November 1859 – 20 November 1882) was an English international footballer who played as a centre forward.

== Early and personal life ==
Tait was born in the Newtown area of Birmingham, the sixth of eight children.

== Career ==
Tait played club football for Birmingham Excelsior, and earned one cap for England on 26 February 1881, in a 1–0 loss to Wales.

== Later life and death ==
He died in Aston on 20 November 1882 of typhoid, aged 23.
