= Birmingham Excelsior F.C. =

Birmingham Excelsior
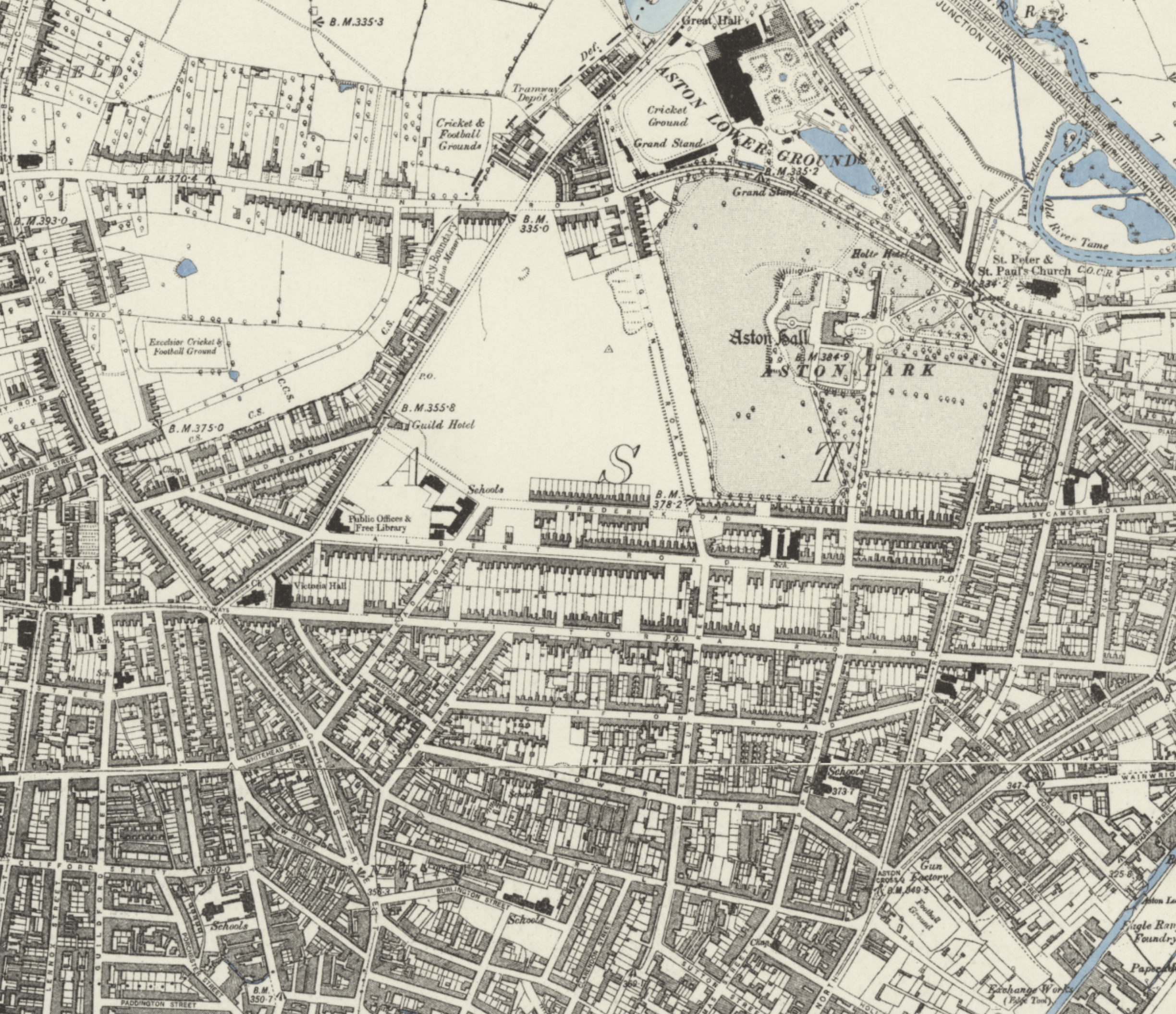
- Full name: Birmingham Excelsior Football Club
- Nickname: the Excels
- Founded: 1874
- Dissolved: c.1889
- Ground: Fentham Road
- Secretary: 1885–88: W. J. Nicholls, * 1888: T. P. Dutton
Home colours

Birmingham Excelsior Football Club was an English football club with a claimed foundation date of 1874.

== History ==
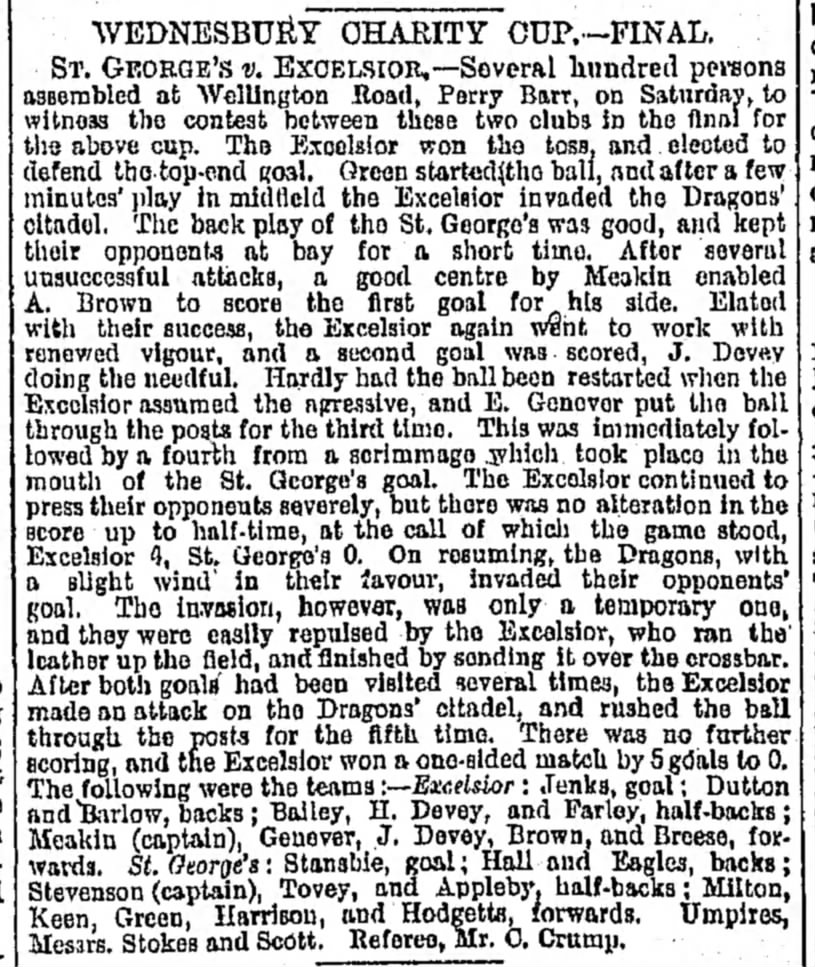
Match report for the 1884-85 Wednesbury Charity Cup Final between Excelsior and St George's

The club emerged from the Phœnix Cricket Club; the club's claimed foundation date of 1874 may refer to the cricket club's foundation, as the earliest record of fixtures for the football club are from October 1876. In 1877, after a dispute over a three-mile run, a number of club members - including Excelsior player/secretary Thomas Pank, who would soon join Aston Villa, and captain Will Davies - founded the Birchfield Harriers athletic club.

Excelsior was an early member of the Birmingham Football Association and entered the Birmingham Senior Cup, the leading competition for Midlands clubs, for the first time in 1879–80, losing 8–1 to Aston Villa in the second round.

=== George Tait and local success ===
The club's best player was George Tait, who received an England cap while registered with the club, and the Birmingham Daily Post reckoned the team as being "nearly the best in Birmingham". However, Tait died of typhoid in November 1882, and the club never recovered from his loss. Indeed, the club nearly wound up before the start of the 1883–84 season, having had a lot of fixtures wiped out by bad weather, but fresh organisation and the recruitment of new playing members, bolstered by a first entry into the FA Cup, kept the club going. The club entered the competition every year until qualifying rounds were introduced in 1888–89.

The club's only significant trophy success came in the Wednesbury Charity Cup in 1884–85, Excelsior beating Stafford Rangers 6–1 in the semi-final and upsetting Mitchells St George's 5–0 in the final, four of the goals coming in the first half; Jack Devey was one of the Excelsior scorers. The club suffered another blow early in the following season, when one of its players, Albert Brown, died on 17 September of "rapid consumption"; Brown, an assistant schoolmaster, was not yet 22.

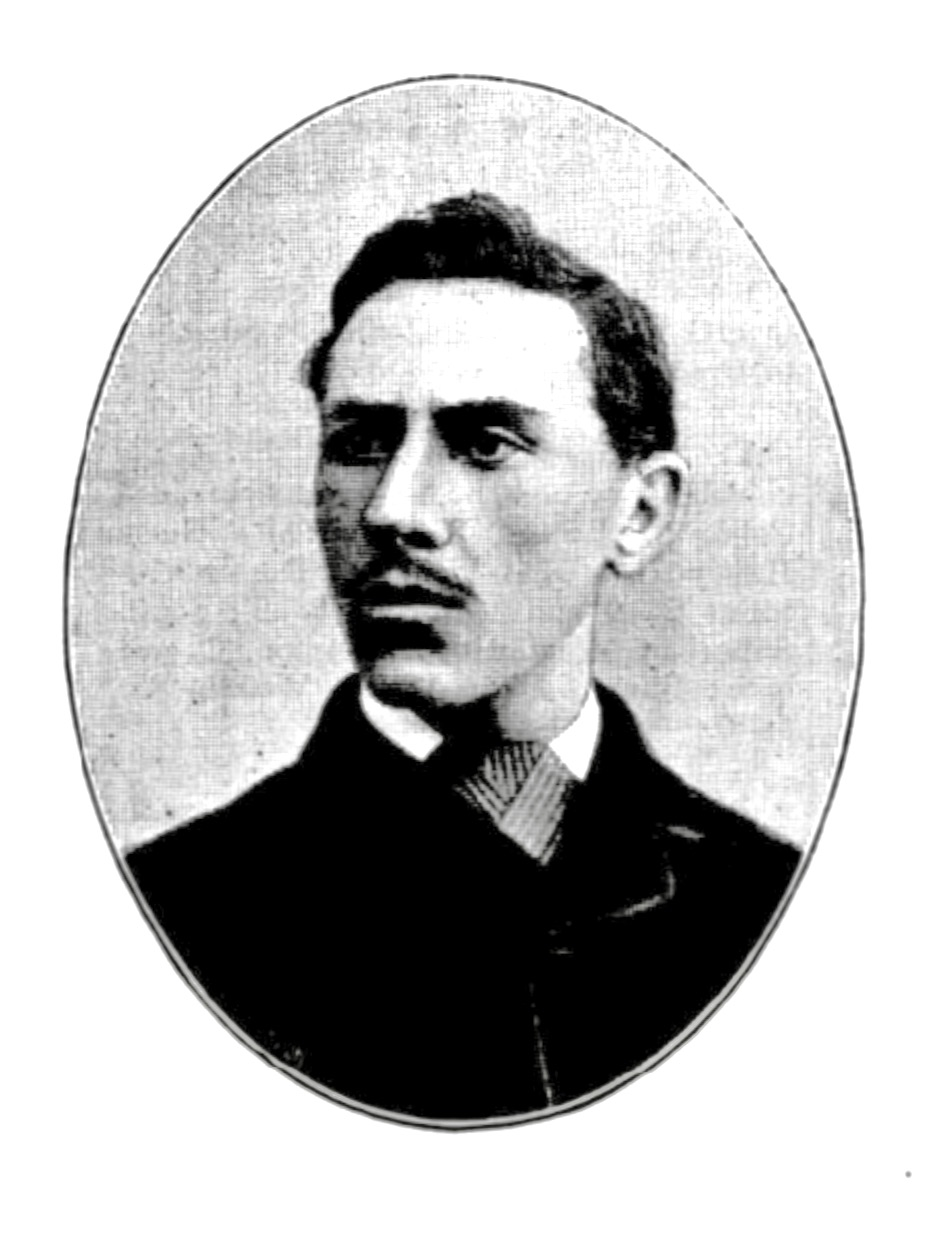
Arthur Bailey, St George's half-back, pictured soon after his move from Excelsior, 1886

1885–86 saw the club's best performance in the Birmingham Senior Cup, reaching the fourth round (the last six) and only losing to Wolverhampton Wanderers in a second replay, having come from 3–0 down in the original tie. Two weeks later Excelsior easily beat Aston Villa 3–0 away from home.

=== Effect of professionalism ===
However, the Football Association had recently allowed professionalism. Over the previous seasons, Aston Villa in particular had found ways around the FA's stance, and, as was common with other clubs based in Aston and thereabouts, Excelsior found it difficult to retain its players, or attract attendances - the home FA Cup tie with Derby Midland in 1885–86 attracted just 400 spectators, compared with over 6,000 at Walsall Town for its tie with Aston Villa at the same stage. When professionalism was legalised, Villa had had a head start that was impossible for Excelsior to close, and other players were recruited by the business-backed West Bromwich Albion and Mitchell St George's, as well as Small Heath Alliance; the club lost six players before the 1887–88 season for this reason.

The club's last entry into the FA Cup was in 1887–88. In the first round, the club beat Warwick County 4–1 at Edgbaston Cricket Ground, but had to replay the tie after a protest about the registration of one of the club's players; in the replay, the club won by a bigger margin (5–0). The club got a bye in the second round, meaning the club reached the third round for the only time in its history, where it lost to Great Bridge Unity in front of a "small" attendance. However the club lost many of its players by the end of the season, most crucially William Siddons moving to St George's. A "crushing defeat" by six goals to nil by Aston rivals Aston Shakespeare in March 1888 led to a make-or-break meeting at the Gaiety in Coleshill Road, following which the club advertised for players in "all positions".

The attempt at a relaunch did not work. The club did not enter the 1888–89 FA Cup qualifying rounds, and its last entry into the Birmingham Senior Cup that season (when it was described as a "ghost" of a club) saw it lose 7–0 at Oldbury Town in a qualifying round. It even lost 6–0 in the first round of the Birmingham Junior Cup to Coleshill. The club was having difficulty in putting a side together (a 7–0 defeat at Leek in November saw the club only field ten men).

The last report for a club match was a 15–1 defeat in a friendly at Darwen in December 1888, although one final match was scheduled against Loughborough in the following February at Fentham Road; it does not appear to have taken place.

== Colours ==
Excelsior played in yellow and maroon, originally in hoops but by the mid-1880s in stripes, with white shorts. For its final season the club registered its colours simply as "marone".

== Grounds ==
Originally the club played at Aston Park before moving in to the Aston Lower Grounds by 1880. In 1881 the club moved to Well Head Lane, on the border of Aston and Perry Barr.

The club moved slightly south, to the former St George's ground in Fentham Road in Aston, when the latter vacated it in 1885, and opened its tenure with a 6–0 thrashing of Wolverhampton Wanderers, in front of 3,000 spectators, on 26 September. The original plan had been to move to the Aston Unity cricket ground, at Trinity Road in Aston, funded by businessman George Kynoch; however Kynoch switched his allegiance to Aston Villa.

After Excelsior's winding-up, the ground was used as a football and rugby ground until 1895, and by 1900 was under housing.

== Notable players ==
- George Tait, England international
- Harry Devey and his nephew Jack, future League players for Aston Villa
- Alf Farman, future Aston Villa and Newton Heath player
- Wilbert Harrison, leading scorer for Birmingham St George's in the Football Alliance
- Eli Davis, who played in Villa's first-ever FA Cup tie, started his career with Excelsior in 1877

== Honours ==
Wednesbury Charity Cup

- Winners: 1884–85
