= Henry Mitchell (brewer) =

- Born: c. 1837
- Died: 1913
- Occupation: Brewer
- Children: Harry Mitchell

Henry Mitchell (c. 1837–1913) was the founder of Mitchell's Brewery which evolved to become Mitchells & Butlers.

== Career ==
Mitchell took over the running of the Crown Inn in Smethwick from his father in 1861. Using the profits from the Inn, he built the Crown Brewery in 1866. Following the success of the Crown Brewery, he built the Cape Hill Brewery in 1872.

His son, Captain Henry Mitchell Junior (1862-1894), known as Harry Mitchell, was managing director of the brewery company until his death from Typhoid. In 1897 Henry Mitchell purchased 14 acres (5.7 ha) of land, and in 1899 presented this to Smethwick Corporation to form what was named in his son's memory "Harry's Park" (now known as "Harry Mitchell Park").
