= Henry Mitchell (oceanographer) =

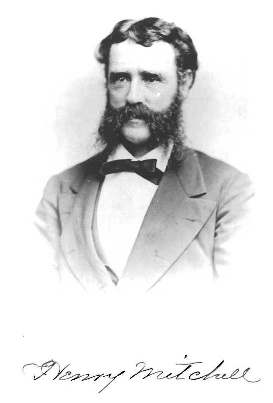
- Born: September 16, 1830; Nantucket, Massachusetts
- Died: December 1, 1902 (aged 72); New York City
- Occupation(s): oceanographer, hydrographer
- Employer: United States Coast Survey
- Known for: Co-Founding the National Geographic Society

Henry Mitchell (September 16, 1830 – December 1, 1902) was an American oceanographer and hydrographer.

== Biography ==
Born in Nantucket on September 16, 1830, into a scientifically inclined family, his mother was a cousin of Benjamin Franklin, and John Greenleaf Whittier was a friend of his father, William, who taught astronomy at Harvard. At age 19 he joined the United States Coast Survey, where his first assignment was a map of the waters around his home of Nantucket. From 1856 until 1860 he worked on a map of New York Harbor, which was considered the most accurate of its day. During the American Civil War he helped map the coasts of North Carolina, and in 1896 he went to a tour through the Old World to study their watery engineering. There he met Ferdinand de Lesseps. In 1888 he helped co-found the National Geographic Society, but shortly thereafter had a health crisis that prevented him from doing any work for the rest of his life. He died in his daughter's house in New York City on December 1, 1902.
