= Henry Mitchell (footballer) =

Australian rules footballer

Personal information
- Full name: Henry James Mitchell
- Born: 22 November 1874; Essendon, Victoria
- Died: 11 April 1943 (aged 68); Hughesdale, Victoria
- Original team: Carlton (VFA)
- Position: Wing

Playing career^{1}
Years	Club	Games (Goals)
1897–99	Melbourne	36 (1)
- ^{1} Playing statistics correct to the end of 1899.

Henry James Mitchell (22 November 1874 – 11 April 1943) was an Australian rules footballer who played with Melbourne in the Victorian Football League (VFL).
