= 1877–78 Aston Villa F.C. season =

Aston Villa
1877–78 season

The 1875–76 English football season was Aston Villa's fourth season, eleven years before the creation of the Football League.

== Friendlies ==
6 January 1877	WOAC	1–1	Aston Villa	Away
			G.B. Ramsay
Note:

13 January 1877	Aston Villa	v	Coventry Association	Perry Bar
