= Andy Hunter (footballer, born 1864) =

Scottish footballer

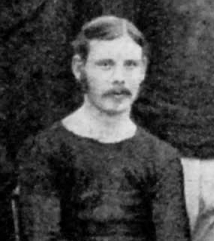
- Hunter in 1879

Personal information
- Date of birth: August 1864
- Place of birth: Joppa, Ayrshire, Scotland
- Date of death: June 19, 1888 (aged 23)
- Place of death: Australia
- Position: Inside right

Senior career*
Years	Team	Apps	(Gls)
1879–1883	Aston Villa	11	(6)
- * Club domestic league appearances and goals

Andrew Hunter (August 1864 in Joppa, Ayrshire, Scotland – 19 June 1888 in Australia) was a Scottish footballer notable for scoring Aston Villa's first goal in the FA Cup.

Hunter played for Ayr Thistle, Third Lanark and Vale of Leven, before coming to England.

The 1879–80 English football season saw Aston Villa's first ever FA Cup tie and thus their entry into top flight competitive association football. The start of the official record was Saturday 13 December 1879 when Villa faced Stafford Road F.C., of the Stafford Road railway works, Wolverhampton. The match was played before a crowd of 2,000 at Stafford's Half-Way House Ground. In 2024, celebrating the club's 150th anniversary, Aston Villa Legacy Numbers were introduced indexing every first-team player who had represented the club in a competitive fixture. Although playing before shirt numbers were introduced in 1926, Goalkeeper John Ball received Legacy Number 1. Andy Hunter #4 officially became Villa's first goal-scorer in the 1-1 draw.

Andy Hunter, like his more famous brother, Archie, who captained Aston Villa in the same period, he died young from a heart attack. Another brother, John, was a Scotland international.

== See also ==
- List of Scottish football families
