= 1881–82 Aston Villa F.C. season =

Aston Villa
1881–82 season
- Chairman: William McGregor
- FA Cup: 4th round

The 1881–82 English football season was Aston Villa's 3rd season in the Football Association Cup, the top-level football competition at the time. This year saw several Club records being set. Howard Vaughton and Albert Brown became the first Villa players to gain international caps. They represented England against Ireland at Belfast. It was not a bad start for the 'Perry Barr Pets' either as Brown scored four, while Vaughton scored five in a 13–0 victory.

Vaughton was a dangerous inside-left for Villa throughout the decade, picking up a Cup Winner's medal and also owned a silversmith's which still exists today in Birmingham's Jewellery Quarter, and was commissioned to make a new FA Cup trophy when the original was stolen while in holders Villa's care in 1895. No England player has ever bettered his record of five goals in one international.

== FA Cup ==
1882 also saw a creditable Cup performance as Villa dispatched Nottingham Forest and Notts County (after a replay) before succumbing to Wednesbury Old Athletic in the fourth round (Villa received a 'bye' in the second round).

5 November 1881 1st Round	Aston Villa	4–1	Nottingham Forest
		🟩 5 Nov 1881, Villa 4-1 Forest, Wellington Road
Note: The 20-year-old Olly Whateley debuted for Villa.

- 2nd Round: Aston Villa received a bye.

31 December 1881 3rd Round	Aston Villa	2–2	Notts County
Note:

7 January 1882 3rd Round Replay	Notts County	2–2	Aston Villa
Note: Replay

14 January 1882 3rd Round Replay	Aston Villa	4–1	Notts County
Note: Replay

21 January 1882 4th Round	Wednesbury Old Athletic	4–2	Aston Villa

== Friendlies ==
It October Villa were beaten 4–1 by the famous Queen's Park club of Glasgow although they would learn from the Scottish club's innovative passing style. It was about this year that Villa began to wear what were described as 'maroon' shirts emblazoned with a large 'Lion Rampant' that now forms the central feature of the club's badge. The Lion Rampant was chosen by William McGregor as the club's emblem in tribute to his native Scotland, and also in recognition of the club's Scottish stars Ramsay and Archie Hunter. This was the first time the Villa kit had come to resemble anything like that worn by the team today. Throughout the 1870s they had worn a variety of kits, including all white, blue and black and all green.

In April 1882 Heart of Midlothian lost 2-6 at home to Aston Villa.
