= John Henry Ball =

English engineer and footballer (1856–1943)

Personal information
- Date of birth: 29 June 1856
- Place of birth: Lambeth, London, England
- Date of death: 19 January 1943
- Place of death: Teignmouth, Devon
- Positions: Goalkeeper; midfielder

Senior career*
Years	Team	Apps	(Gls)
1879–1880	Aston Villa		
1899	Team Anglès	1	(0)
1900–1901	FC Barcelona	0	(0)
- * Club domestic league appearances and goals

John Henry Ball (29 June 1856 – 19 January 1943) was an engineer and a footballer who played as a goalkeeper for Aston Villa and later as a midfielder for Team Anglès in 1899 and who then joined the ranks of FC Barcelona in 1900, although he did not play a single match for the team. He briefly worked as a referee in the first edition of the Copa Macaya, overseeing the first competitive match in the history of football in Catalonia.

== Early and personal life ==
Ball was born on 29 June 1856 in the London Borough of Lambeth, as the son of John Epton Ball and Marianna Ball née Burt. On 5 June 1881, he married Julia Emma Dale (1859–?) in Coventry, and the couple had seven children John Henry (1883–1938), Frank (1884–?), Percy Edward (1886–?), Eleanor Marion (1888–1976), all born in Coventry, Charles Bernard born in London (1889–1963), and David Lewis (1891–1981), and Walter Lawrence Ball (1893–1962), the latter two in Nottingham.

Julia Ball died in Barcelona on 13 October 1901. Nothing else is known from his personal life, but it is possible that he remarried and had more children.

== Professional career ==
In 1889, Ball created a company, together with other partners, in Ilkeston, near Nottingham, called Nottingham Mechanists Company, Ld. He was a "specialist" in bicycles, and in fact, he even devised some modifications that he patented.

In 1898, the Ball family moved to Barcelona, and his father began appearing in the press on several occasions: from bicycle mechanic to inventor and quincallería builder. Ball then founded a company called J.H. Bell, Constructor de máquinas y tornillos, located in Carrer Ali Bei, no. 26, and in 1905, the company changed its name to "Successores de JH Bell" while maintaining the location.

== Football career ==
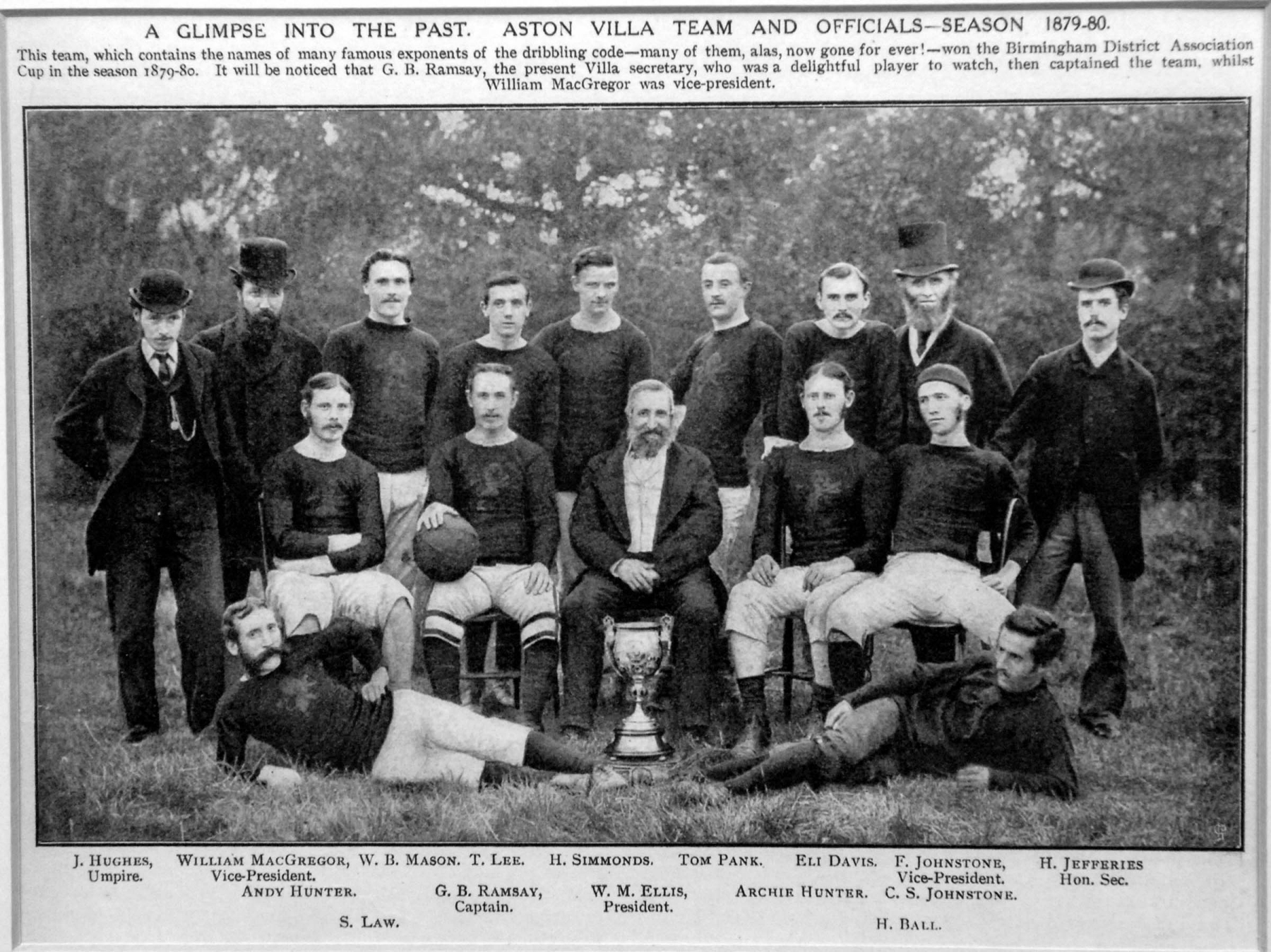
Aston Villa 1879–80, Ball, bottom right

Having transferred from Arcadians, Ball played two matches in the 1879–80 FA Cup as a goalkeeper for Birmingham-based Aston Villa. The 1879–80 English football season saw Villa's first ever FA Cup tie: on Saturday 13 December 1879 Villa faced Stafford Road F.C., of the Stafford Road railway works, Wolverhampton. The match was played before a crowd of 2,000 at the opponents' Half-Way House Ground. As the start of the official record, celebrating the club's 150th anniversary in 2024, Aston Villa Legacy Numbers were introduced indexing every player who had represented the club in a first-class competitive fixture. Although playing before shirt numbers were introduced in 1926, Goalkeeper John Ball received Legacy Number 1. He helped his side to a 3–1 win in the replay on 24 January 1880. Aston Villa declined to compete in the 3rd round giving a walkover to Oxford University.

Ball moved to Coventry where he married in 1881. Before leaving England, Ball brought a football ball with him. On every Sunday morning, he would take his three oldest sons, John Henry, Frank, and Percy, to the Velódromo de la Bonanova, to teach them the practice of football, a sport that was practically unknown in the city at the time. They soon befriended other English families that played football in the city, such as the Morris (Jaime, Samuel, Enrique (Henry), and Miguel), the Parsons (John and William), the Witties (Arthur and Ernest), and the Shields (John and Thomas), most of whom belonged to a team known as Team Anglès, which consisted of members of the British colony living in Barcelona.

On 26 December 1899, three players with the last name Ball started for Team Anglès in a match at Bonanova against a combination of the best players of FC Barcelona and Català FC, which ended in a 1–2 loss, courtesy of a brace from the Barça founder Joan Gamper. The chronicle of this match appears in three local newspapers, two of which being identical since the author is Alberto Serra. In those three publications, the initials of two of the Balls are "J" and "F", his sons John and Frank, while the third member is more disparate, appearing as "A", "J.A." and "W", which does not suit anyone else from the Ball family, but it is most likely John the father, who was known in the city for his full name John Henry ("Enrique") Ball (J. E. Ball), so it was either a press mistake or the "A" is a reference to the street in which his company was domiciled, Ali Bei. Ball, who was 43, played in the midfield while his son John (16) was the goalkeeper and Frank, who was just 15, formed a defensive partnership with Henry W. Brown.

A year later, in 1900, J. Ball was registered with FC Barcelona to participate in the first edition of the Copa Macaya, which was the first football competition played on the Iberian Peninsula. In the end, however, Ball does not appear in any of the Barça lineups, and instead appears as a referee, overseeing the opening match of the tournament between FC Barcelona and Hispania AC on Sunday 20 January 1901, which was the first competitive match in Catalonia; it ended in a 2–1 victory to the latter thanks to a brace from the Hispania captain Gustavo Green. Coincidentally, the tournament's last match was also refereed by a Briton born in 1856, William Mauchan.

In the following year, on 6 January 1902, Ball refereed another match between Hispania AC and FC Barcelona, again the Copa Macaya, but this time at the Camp del Carrer Muntaner, which ended in a 4–2 victory for the visiting side thanks to goals from Alfonso Albéniz, Gamper, and John Parsons.

His son Frank went on to join FC Internacional, which was founded in 1901, for whom he played in three lesser tournaments organized by the Spanish Gymnastics Federation, the 1902 Medalla del Ayuntamiento between February and June 1902, in which he played all 12 games of the competition in the defensive position; the 1902 Copa Pergamino between September and November 1902 (during the festivities of La Mercè), which had been created for the clubs founded in the 1901–02 season, with Frank now as the captain of the team. Both of those tournaments were won by the second team of FC Barcelona, but then in the third tournament on 1 October 1902, in which only two clubs signed up, Internacional and RCD Espanyol, Frank kept a clean sheet to help his side to a 2–0 victory.

== Later life ==
In 1905, his son Walter Lawrence, then 12 years old, had found a metal object on the mountain of Montjuïc, and when he was handling it in Carrer de la Mercè, it exploded and he partially lost three fingers of the left hand. It was a fulminant of those used for work in quarries and mines.

Before the First World War, the Ball family returned to the United Kingdom. All of his sons married, except for Frank. Percy had his first daughter in Barcelona, David emigrated to the USA where he settled permanently. Walter married a Barcelona woman, Antònia Sànchez, with whom he had two children, John José and Julia Angela (it is unknown if Walter returned to the United Kingdom). Frank, Percy, and Charles enlisted in the British Army during the First World War. The date of his death is unknown.
