= 1879–80 in English football =

Football in England
- Season: 1879–80

Men's football
- FA Cup: Clapham Rovers

The 1879–80 season was the ninth season of competitive football in England.

== International matches ==
Date	Venue	Opponents	Score*	England scorers	Scotland scorers
13 March 1880	Hampden Park, Glasgow	Scotland	4–5	Billy Mosforth (The Wednesday) (8 mins), Charles Bambridge (Swifts) (42 & 87 mins) & Francis Sparks (Clapham Rovers) (89 mins)	John L Kay, George Ker (3), John Baird

Date	Venue	Opponents	Score	England scorers	Wales scorers
15 March 1880	Racecourse Ground, Wrexham	Wales	3–2	Francis Sparks (Clapham Rovers) (50 & 70 mins) & Tom Brindle (Darwen) (55 mins)	John Roberts, William Roberts

* England score given first

Note – TheFa.com gives different times for the England goals in the match against Wales.

== Honours ==
Competition	Winner
FA Cup	Clapham Rovers (1)

Notes = Number in parentheses is the times that club has won that honour. * indicates new record for competition
