= Langley Green Victoria F.C. =

Langley Green Victoria
- Full name: Langley Green Victoria Football Club
- Nicknames: The Vics, the Victoria
- Founded: 1884
- Dissolved: 1892
- Ground: Causeway Ground
- Secretary: J. Wheldon, Benjamin Smith.
- President: A. Thompson
Home colours

Langley Green Victoria F.C. was an association football club from Langley Green, then in Worcestershire, active in the 19th century.

== History ==
The club was founded out of a cricket club, which dated back to 1878. The earliest reference to the football side is from the 1884–85 season. Unlike neighbours Oldbury Town, the Victoria was a purely amateur club.

On 20 November 1886, the club was hosting Kidderminster Harriers in a friendly. Samuel Wheldon, in the Vics' defence, tried to clear an awkward ball, missed his kick, and struck the Harriers' forward William Colsey in the stomach. The seriously-injured Colsey was taken to Wheldon's father's house, but he died on the next day. Fortunately for Wheldon, a policeman (PC Baylis) was watching the match, and was able to testify to an inquest that it was a pure accident, so the jury returned a verdict of accidental death. The Vics hosted a friendly match against a combined Kidderminster side at Christmas to raise funds for Colsey's mother.

The rest of the 1886–87 was successful for the club; having reached the final of the Birmingham Junior Cup, in April it arranged a home friendly with the professional side Birmingham Excelsior as a tune-up, and recorded a startling 6–0 win. The Vics won the final, at Smethwick Carriage Works' Brasshouse Lane ground, by beating Unity Gas 3–1. The match was a bruising one, the Vics' full-back Joseph Saunders breaking an ankle. Evidently there were no hard feelings between the sides, as a fortnight later Unity went to Causeway Green to play a benefit match for Saunders, and won a "keenly-contested" match 6–5. There was however a sting in the tail - for taking a weekly allowance out of his accident fund, the footballing authorities investigated whether this made him a professional.

Unity gained a competitive revenge in 1887–88 by knocking the Vics out of the Junior Cup at the semi-final stage, with a 2–0 win at Edgbaston Cricket Ground. The Vics were aggrieved as they were without four of their best players, the Birmingham Football Association having declared them to be professionals and thus ineligible. The players were re-instated after an appeal, but the Association refused to extend the deadline for the tie, which was duly played before the appeal. The Victoria proved something of a point by beating the new holders of the trophy, Aston Victoria, the following month.

Having such a good recent record in the Junior cup, the Victoria made its debut in the Birmingham Senior Cup in 1888–89, and only lost to a late goal against the professional Burton Swifts in the third round. That debut season however was its best performance in the competition. The same season, it was a founder member of the Birmingham and District League, being ranked 5th out of 12 in the incomplete final reckoning.

The club entered the FA Cup for the only time in 1890–91. After an easy first round win over Kettering Town, it seemingly beat Great Bridge Unity in the second, but the tie had to be re-played after Unity protested the Victoria for nominating a club member as umpire, and Unity won the replay - at Great Bridge - 4–2. Langley Green obtained an ironic revenge by protesting against Unity's Pittaway as being ineligible, but it did the Vics no good; the protest was too late to overturn their defeat, but it did result in Unity's defeat of Kidderminster Harriers to be overturned.

With professionalism squeezing the smaller clubs out of the game, the Vics withdrew from the Birmingham League and Senior Cup after the 1891–92 season, and only fitfully played in 1892–93, its last recorded fixture being a defeat at the Rudge cycle factory side in March 1893. Such was the state of the club's finances that a bootmaker had to bring legal proceedings to recover £4 5/ for the supply of nine pairs; the claim failed as the defunct club, rather than the club's secretary, was responsible.

== Colours ==
The club wore claret and light blue shirts.

== Ground ==
The club played at the Causeway Ground.

== Notable players ==
- Fred Wheldon, later to set a record for the most expensive transfer fee, started his competitive career at Victoria, before signing for Small Heath in 1890.
- Bill Taylor, who followed Wheldon to Small Heath on Wheldon's recommendation
