= 1880–81 West Bromwich Albion F.C. season =

West Bromwich Albion
1880–81 season
- Chairman: None (Note: Albion did not have a chairman until 1885.)
- Manager: None (Note: Albion did not have a secretary-manager until 1890 and did not appoint a full-time manager until 1948.)
- Stadium: Cooper's Hill and Dartmouth Park
- Biggest win: 14–0 v Oakfield
- Biggest defeat: None recorded
Home colours	Away colours

The 1880–81 season was the third season in the history of West Bromwich Albion Football Club. During the season, Albion played their home matches at Cooper's Hill and Dartmouth Park and were captained by Jimmy Stanton.

== Matches ==
Though yet to start playing competitive football, West Bromwich Albion did take part in a number of friendly matches throughout the season. On 29 January 1881, Billy Bisseker scored three times in the 5–0 win against Hockley Belmont; this was the first recorded hat-trick by an Albion player. The record of the club's matches during their early years is not complete, for example the score from the match against West Bromwich Royal was not recorded.

Date	Opponent	Venue	Result	Score (Note: West Bromwich Albion's score is listed first, regardless of the venue or result.) F–A
6 November 1880	Summer Hill Works	H	W	4–0
6 December 1880	Hockley Abbey	A	W	2–0
1 January 1881	Aston Napier	A	D	0–0
29 January 1881	Hockley Belmont	H	W	5–0
5 February 1881	Summer Hill Works	H	W	4–0
12 February 1881	Hockley Abbey	A	W	2–0
19 February 1881	Hockley Belmont	A	W	5–0
26 February 1881	West Bromwich Royal	H	—	— (Note: Score not recorded.)
10 March 1881	Smethwick Windmill	H	W	9–1
12 March 1881	West Bromwich Rovers	H	W	8–0
26 March 1881	Oakfield	H	W	14–0

Source for match details:

== See also ==
- 1880–81 in English football
