= Worcestershire Senior Cup =

Association-football competition in England

- Organiser(s): Worcestershire County FA
- Founded: 1893; 133 years ago
- Region: Worcestershire
- Current champions: Worcester City (30th title)
- Most championships: Worcester City (30 titles)

The Worcestershire Senior Cup (officially The Worcestershire Football Association Senior Invitation Cup) is a football competition organised by the Worcestershire County Football Association. It began in the 1893-94 season, with Redditch Town taking the first honours. Due to the dearth of professional clubs within the county, few professional teams have taken part, though Walsall, Aston Villa, and Kidderminster Harriers are past winners.

The Senior Cup is the more senior of the county's two main cups, and at present entry is restricted to those clubs which are affiliated to the County FA and compete in the Southern Football League or higher. Clubs from lower leagues compete in the Worcestershire Senior Urn.

== Winners ==
=== List of finals ===
The winners of the Cup have been as follows:

Season	Winners	Result	Runner-up	Venue	Notes
1893–94	Redditch Town				
1894–95	Oldbury Town				
1895–96	Kidderminster Harriers				
1896–97	Oldbury Town				
1897–98	Oldbury Town				
1898–99	Bourneville Athletic				
1890–1900	No competition held for reasons unknown.				
1900–01	Berwick Rangers (Worcestershire)				
1901–02	Berwick Rangers (Worcestershire)				
1902–03	Bourneville Athletic				
1903–04	Kidderminster Harriers				
1904–05	Stourbridge				
1905–06	Stourbridge				
1906–07	Brierley Hill Alliance				
1907–08	Worcester City				
1908–09	Worcester City				
1909–10	Worcester City				
1910–11	Worcester City				
1911–12	Worcester City				
1912–13	Worcester City				
1913–14	Worcester City				
1914–1919	No competition due to World War I.				
1919–20	Stourbridge				
1920–21	Kidderminster Harriers				
1921–22	Stourbridge				
1922–23	Cradley Heath				
1923–24	Stourbridge				
1924–25	Cradley Heath				
1925–26	Cradley Heath				
1926–27	Cradley Heath				
1927–28	Stourbridge				
1928–29	Worcester City				
1929–30	Worcester City				
1930–31	Redditch Town				
1931–32	Kidderminster Harriers				
1932–33	Worcester City				
1933–34	Kidderminster Harriers				
1934–35	Kidderminster Harriers				
1935–36	Kidderminster Harriers				
1936–37	Kidderminster Harriers				
1937–38	Brierley Hill Alliance				
1938–39	Aston Villa				
1939–40	Worcester City				
1940–1945	No competition due to World War II.				
1945–46	Worcester City				
1946–47	Bromsgrove Rovers				
1947–48	Bromsgrove Rovers				
1948–49	Worcester City				
1949–50	Stourbridge				
1950–51	Brierley Hill Alliance				
1951–52	Halesowen Town				
1952–53	Hereford United				
1953–54	Aston Villa				
1954–55	Hereford United				
1955–56	Worcester City				
1956–57	Worcester City				
1957–58	Worcester City				
1958–59	Worcester City				
1959–60	Bromsgrove Rovers				
1960–61	Worcester City				
1961–62	Halesowen Town				
1962–63	Worcester City				
1963–64	Hereford United				
1964–65	Worcester City				
1965–66	Kidderminster Harriers				
1966–67	Kidderminster Harriers				
1967–68	Stourbridge				
1968–69	Kidderminster Harriers				
1969–70	Worcester City				
1970–71	Kidderminster Harriers				
1971–72	Kidderminster Harriers				
1972–73	Alvechurch				
1973–74	Alvechurch				
1974–75	Redditch Town				
1975–76	Redditch Town				
1976–77	Alvechurch				
1977–78	Worcester City				
1978–79	Kidderminster Harriers				
1979–80	Worcester City				
1980–81	Stourbridge				
1981–82	Worcester City				
1982–83	Kidderminster Harriers				
1983–84	Worcester City				
1984–85	Kidderminster Harriers				
1985–86	Kidderminster Harriers	3–2	Bromsgrove Rovers		1st Leg: 0–0, 2nd Leg: 3–2, Agg: 3–2
1986–87	Bromsgrove Rovers	4–0	Moor Green		1st Leg: 4–0, 2nd Leg: 0–0, Agg: 4–0
1987–88	Worcester City				
1988–89	Kidderminster Harriers	3–1	Bromsgrove Rovers		1st Leg: 1–0, 2nd Leg: 2–1, Agg: 3–1
1989–90	Kidderminster Harriers	3–1	Bromsgrove Rovers		1st Leg: 1–0, 2nd Leg: 2–1, Agg: 3–1
1990–91	Kidderminster Harriers	5–1	Sutton Coldfield Town		Agg: 5–1
1991–92	Bromsgrove Rovers	4–1	Sutton Coldfield Town		Agg: 4–1
1992–93	Kidderminster Harriers	3–1	Solihull Borough		1st Leg: 1–0, 2nd Leg: 2–1, Agg: 3–1
1993–94	Bromsgrove Rovers	5–1	Kidderminster Harriers		Agg: 5–1
1994–95	Bromsgrove Rovers	4–1	Moor Green		1st Leg: 4–1, 2nd Leg: 0–0, Agg: 4–1
1995–96	Bromsgrove Rovers	4–3	Stourbridge		1st Leg: 1–2, 2nd Leg: 3–1, Agg: 4–3
1996–97	Worcester City	4–1	Solihull Borough		Agg: 4–1
1997–98	Kidderminster Harriers	2–1	Solihull Borough		Single game
1998–99	Kidderminster Harriers	4–3	Worcester City		1st Leg: 2–3, 2nd Leg: 2–0, Agg: 4–3
1990–2000	Kidderminster Harriers				
2000–01	Moor Green	5–3	Evesham United		1st Leg: 1–1, 2nd Leg: 4–2, Agg: 5–3
2001–02	Kidderminster Harriers	2–1	Moor Green		1st Leg: 2–0, 2nd Leg: 0–1, Agg: 2–1
2002–03	Halesowen Town	3–0	Evesham United		1st Leg: 2–0, 2nd Leg: 1–0, Agg: 3–0
2003–04	Sutton Coldfield Town	5–4	Worcester City		1st Leg: 2–1, 2nd Leg: 3–3, Agg: 5–4
2004–05	Halesowen Town	3–1	Studley		1st Leg: 1–1, 2nd Leg: 2–0, Agg: 3–1
2005–06	Moor Green	5–2	Halesowen Town		1st Leg: 4–1, 2nd Leg: 1–1, Agg: 5–2
2006–07	Evesham United				
2007–08	Redditch United				
2008–09	Evesham United				
2009–10	Kidderminster Harriers				
2010–11	Stourbridge				
2011–12	Stourbridge				
2012–13	Stourbridge				
2013–14	Redditch United				
2014–15	Kidderminster Harriers				
2015–16	Worcester City				
2016–17	Kidderminster Harriers				
2017–18	Evesham United				
2018–19	Alvechurch				
2019–20	Abandoned due to COVID-19 pandemic.Alvechurch and Bromsgrove Sporting were in the finals.				
2020–21	No competition due to COVID-19 pandemic.				
2021–22	Pershore Town				
2022–23	Stourport Swifts				
2023–24	Alvechurch				
2024-25	Worcester City				
2025-26	Worcester City				

=== Win by teams ===
Club	Winners	Last win	Notes
Worcester City	30	2025-26	Record most titles
Kidderminster Harriers	27	2016-17	
Stourbridge	12	2012–13	
Bromsgrove Rovers †	6	1995–96	Dissolved in 2010.
Redditch United	6	2013–14	Won 4 titles as Redditch Town.
Alvechurch	5	2023–24	
Cradley Heath †	4	1926–27	Dissolved in 1970.
Halesowen Town	4	2004–05	
Brierley Hill Alliance †	3	1950–51	Dissolved in 1981.
Evesham United	3	2017–18	
Hereford United †	3	1963–64	Dissolved in 2014.
Oldbury Town †	3	1897–98	Dissolved in 1907.
Aston Villa	2	1953–54	
Berwick Rangers (Worcestershire) †	2	1901–02	Dissolved in 1954.
Bourneville Athletic †	2	1902–03	Dissolved in 1905.
Moor Green †	2	2005–06	Merged with Solihull Borough to form Solihull Moors in 2007.
Pershore Town	1	2021–22	
Stourport Swifts	1	2022–23	
Sutton Coldfield Town	1	2003–04	
