= Unity Gas Department F.C. =

English association football club

Unity Gas F.C.
- Full name: Unity Gas Department Football Club
- Nicknames: the Gasmen, the Tar & Feather
- Founded: 1885
- Dissolved: 1895
- Ground: Showell Green Lane
- Secretary: 1885: R. J. Willmott 1888: J. Glew 1891: W. Walters
Home colours

Unity Gas Department F.C., more usually referred to as Unity Gas, was a works association football club from Birmingham, active in the 19th century.

== History ==
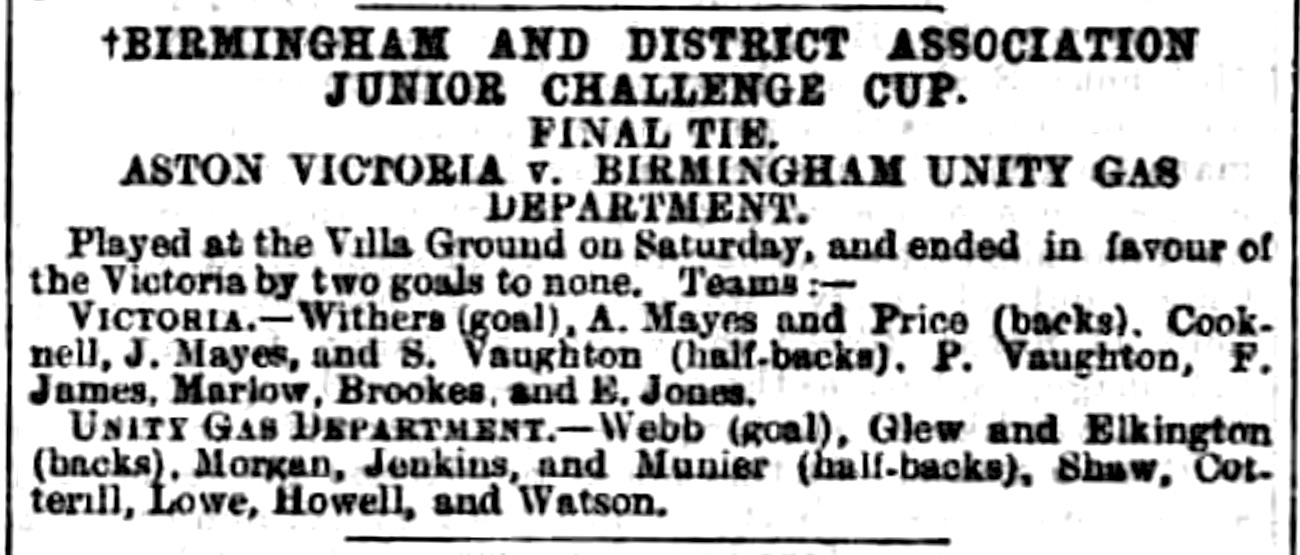
The Aston Victoria and Unity Gas Dept teams for the 1887–88 Birmingham Junior Cup final, Sporting Life, 28 March 1888

The club was founded in 1885, and was made up of employees of the Birmingham Corporation Gas Department, which was based at Windsor Street. The club was formed just after a cricket club was formed by the department, although the cricket club had to give up in 1886, being unable to find a ground.

The Gasmen took part in the first Birmingham Junior Cup in 1886–87, and reached the final, beating holder Perry Barr 6–2 on neutral territory at West Bromwich in the fourth round. In the final the Gasmen were beaten 3–1 by Langley Green Victoria at the Smethwick Carriage Works ground at Brasshouse Lane. The Gasmen gained a revenge in the following year's competition, by beating the Vics 2–0 in the semi-final at Edgbaston Cricket Ground, albeit the Vics had been deprived of four players through being declared ineligible - wrongly as it turned out. The final, against Aston Victoria at the Wellington Road ground, was considered to be a battle of the Gasmen's brawn against the Victoria's brains; Unity Gas went in as favourite, but an early Victoria goal settled the younger team's nerves, and Vaughton (brother of Villa player Howard Vaughton) scored a second goal shortly after, there being no further score.

In 1888–89, the club took part in the first Warwickshire Senior Cup, losing 3–0 at Small Heath in the quarter-finals. It also made its Birmingham Senior Cup debut with a surprise 3–2 win at Warwick County - who in turn had beaten Stoke F.C. in the FA Cup - in the first qualifying round, in a game described as "shockingly rough", scoring twice in the last 20 minutes to turn around a half-time deficit. Gas lost 3–1 at Showell Green Lane to Notts Olympic in the second.

=== Birmingham and District League ===
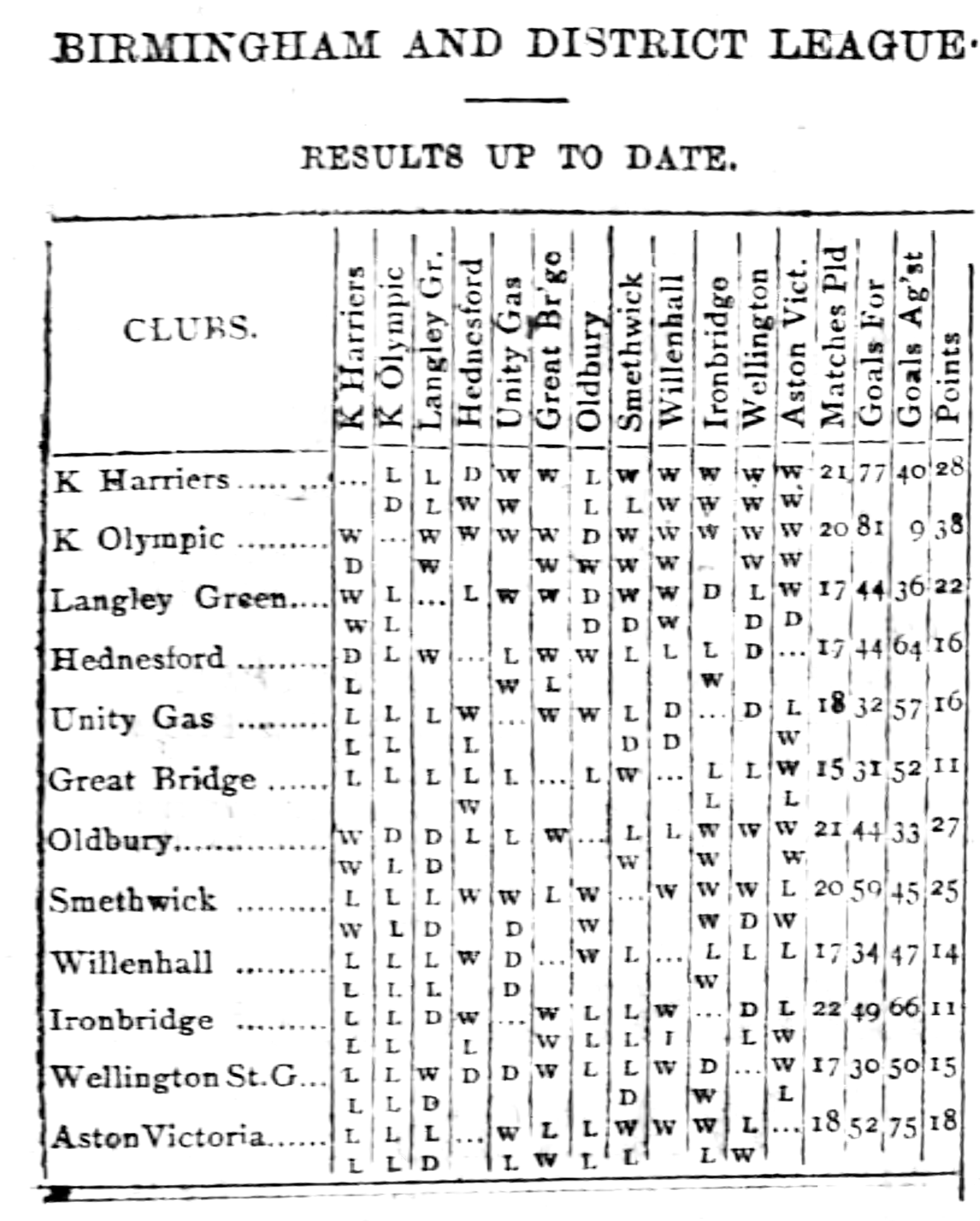
1889–90 Birmingham & District League results summary, taken from the Kidderminster Shuttle, 19 April 1890

The following season, Unity Gas was a founder member of the Birmingham and District League, but the season was never properly completed. The Gasmen were 9th out of 12 when the fixtures fizzled out; the club's second (and last) Birmingham Senior Cup campaign also collapsed in the first ground with an 8–1 defeat at Wednesbury Old Athletic. The club however had a much more successful time in the second (and final) Warwickshire Senior Cup; the competition exempted the three professional members (Small Heath, Warwick County, and Birmingham St George's) were exempted until the semi-finals, leaving one spot remaining for the other seven entries. The Gasmen duly won that spot with wins over Wesleyan Falcon and Small Heath Unity, and were drawn to host Small Heath, only narrowly going out to a strong Heathens side by 5 goals to 4. Although the club was voted in as a Birmingham League member again for 1890–91, it did not take part in any league action again.

The club's greatest honour was winning the Walsall Junior Cup in 1890–91, beating Willenhall Pickwick 3–2 in an exciting final at the Chuckery, home of Walsall Town Swifts, in which the Gasmen were twice pegged back from the lead before securing the trophy. The club also reached the semi-final of the Birmingham Junior Cup, and the tie was suffused in controversy; Charlie Athersmith, who had signed to play for Aston Villa, agreed to remain with the Gasmen for the tournament, described as "a sportsmanlike action on his part, and one which redounds to his credit". Semi-final opponent Willenhall Pickwick did not agree, and, after a draw was played out at Brierley Hill Alliance, protested that Athersmith - having by now played Football League matches - was automatically barred from the competition. The Birmingham FA did not agree, and, as a consequence, the replay between the sides (at the Wednesbury Oval) was described as "one of the purest specimens of rowdyism that has ever disgraced a football field" - the Gasmen however were overcome by 4 goals to 2.

=== Demise ===
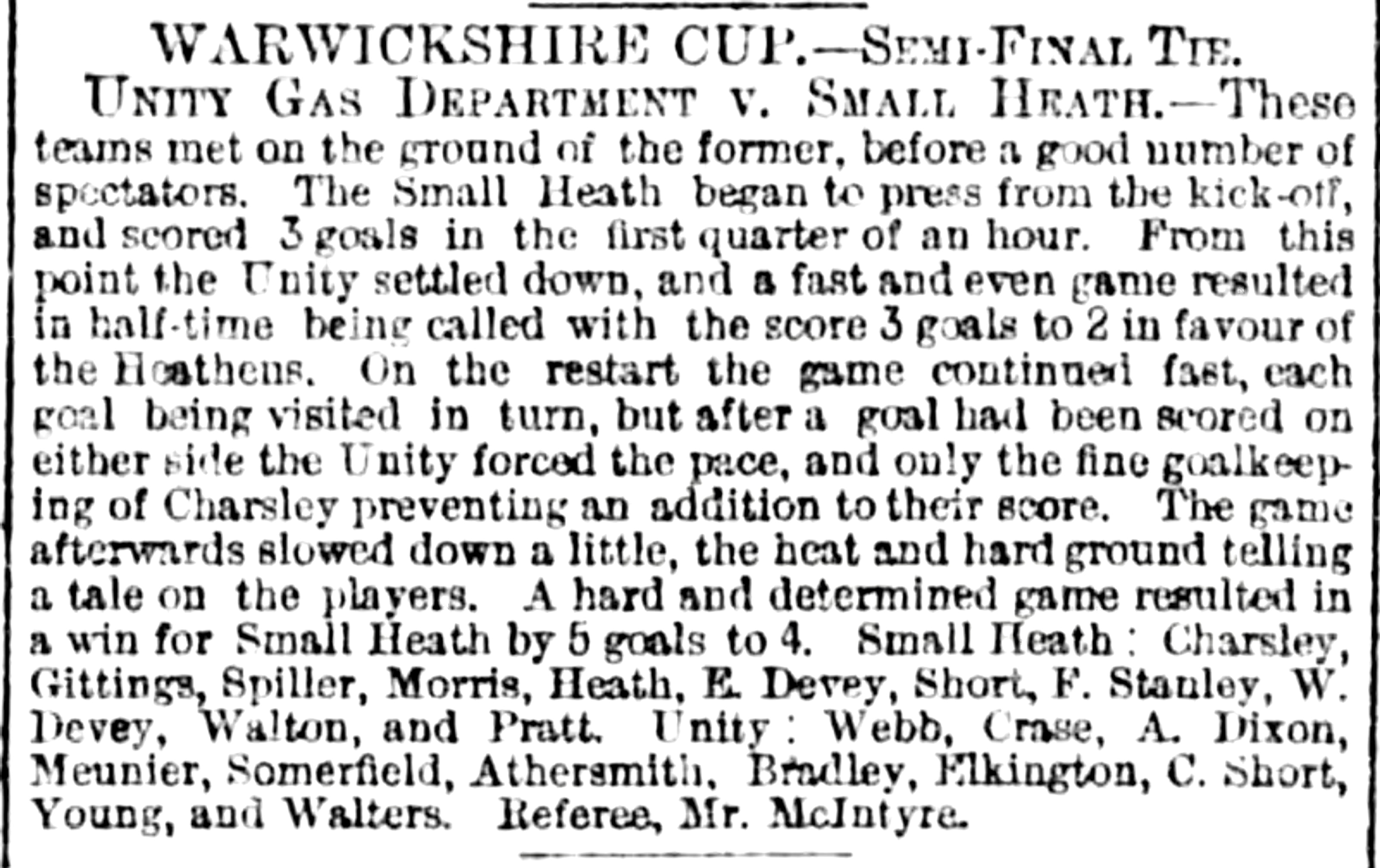
1889–90 Warwickshire Senior Cup semi-final, Unity Gas 4–5 Small Heath, Birmingham Post, 5 May 1890

At the end of the 1891–92 season, the club held a 5-a-side tournament at Small Heath's Coventry Road, in order to raise funds, given the club was "financially in low water". Indeed, the situation was so serious that the club - so recently considered "the best junior team in the country" - nearly disbanded, but "thanks to the energy of [secretary] Wal Walters" a side was got up for the 1892–93 season, albeit at a distinct step in ability down from its previous heights.

The revival however was futile, and the last references to the club are from the 1894–95 season. Before the season's end, the club's players were seeking berths with other clubs, and the entity had in effect dissolved by the 1895–96 season.

== Colours ==
The club originally wore black and white stripes, from which it derived a nickname of the Tar & Feather. By 1888 the club was wearing dark and light blue stripes.

== Ground ==
The club originally played at Bordesley Green Road, in Small Heath. Before the 1886–87 season it moved to Green Lanes, on which it was able to lay out two pitches, so its first and second XIs could play at the same time. In 1887, the club moved to Showell Green Lane, in Sparkhill, a mile from Small Heath railway station; its first match there was a 2–1 win in the Junior Cup against Small Heath Wordsley on 3 December.

== Notable players ==
The club was a fertile source of players for the professional clubs in the area, Aston Villa's aggression over trying to recruit players proving so unpopular with the club that at one point the Gasmen threatened to throw Villa "poachers, kidnappers, and bodysnatchers" into the "not remarkably clean" canal by the gasworks. Perhaps as a result players tended to join other clubs instead when turning professional, Charlie Leatherbarrow going to Walsall Town Swifts and, most notably, Caesar Jenkyns to Small Heath in 1888; Villa had approached Jenkyns at the 1888 Junior Cup final, but the rebuttal was such that Villa dared not approach again. Jenkyns would later gain international recognition for Wales.

By 1891 however, with professionalism having driven a chasm between professional and works clubs, this under-the-counter "poaching" was less of an issue and was made more legitimate. In 1891, future England international Charlie Athersmith left Unity Gas for the Villa. Goalkeeper Jim Roach, who joined the Gasmen on leaving the Army in 1892, went on to Small Heath in 1894.

Athersmith and Matt Summerfield (centre-half) were both selected by the Birmingham FA in representative matches while Unity Gas players. Summerfield later played for Singers F.C., the club which became Coventry City.

== Honours ==
- Birmingham Senior Cup
  - Best run: 2nd round, 1888–89
- Warwickshire Senior Cup
  - Best run: semi-final, 1889–90
- Birmingham Junior Cup
  - Runner-up: 1886–87, 1887–88
- Walsall Junior Cup
  - Winner: 1890–91
