= 1879–80 West Bromwich Strollers F.C. season =

West Bromwich Albion
1879–80 season
- Chairman: None (Note: Albion did not have a chairman until 1885.)
- Manager: None (Note: Albion did not have a secretary-manager until 1890 and did not appoint a full-time manager until 1948.)
- Stadium: Cooper's Hill and Dartmouth Park
- Biggest win: 5–0 v Heart of Oak
- Biggest defeat: None recorded
Home colours

The 1879–80 season was the second season in the history of West Bromwich Albion Football Club. During this period, Albion played their home matches at Cooper's Hill and Dartmouth Park.

== Matches ==
West Bromwich Albion had yet to begin playing competitive football, but did take part in a number of friendly matches throughout the season. The 1–0 win against Black Lake Victoria on 13 December 1879 was for many years Albion's first recorded match, but later that honour was given to the West Bromwich Strollers' match against Hudson's from the previous year. The Black Lake game did nevertheless feature Albion's first recorded goal, scored by Harry Aston in front of 500 spectators. The record of the club's matches during their early years is not complete; of the five matches that were recorded for 1879–80, two are missing the scoreline.

| Date | Opponent | Venue | Result | Score (Note: West Bromwich Albion's score is listed first, regardless of the venue or result.) F–A |
|---|---|---|---|---|
| 13 December 1879 | Black Lake Victoria | H | W | 1–0 |
| 20 December 1879 | Bullock's Club | H | W | 4–0 |
| 31 January 1880 | St. Phillip's | H | — | — (Note: Score not recorded.) |
| 3 April 1880 | Heart of Oak | H | W | 5–0 |
| 1 May 1880 | Christ Church | H | — | — |

Source for match details:

== See also ==
- 1879–80 in English football
