= Birmingham Gas Light and Coke Company =

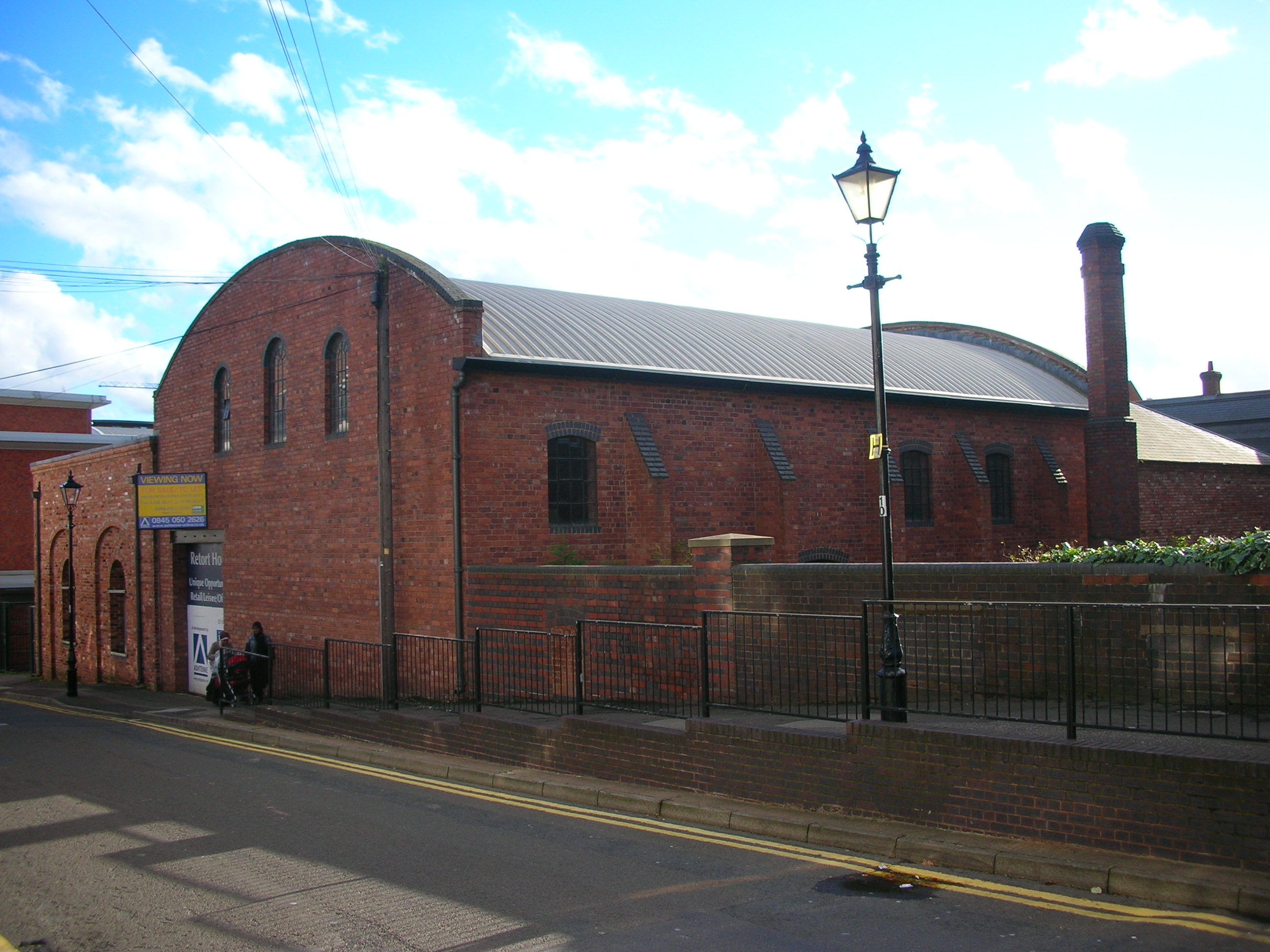
The Gas Retort House, Gas Street, Birmingham

The Birmingham Gas Light and Coke Company operated in Birmingham from 1819 to 1875.

== History ==
John Gosling of London responded to a tender of 1816 from the Birmingham Street Commissioners for the provision of gas street lighting.

Gosling built his first works on Gas Street in 1817-18, with plant installed by Samuel Clegg. The streets of Birmingham were lit by gas for the first time on 14 April 1819. The Birmingham Gas Light and Coke Company, formed by an act of Parliament, the Birmingham Gas Act 1825 (6 Geo. 4. c. lxxix), obtained the business of Gosling in 1819.

The Gas Retort House was constructed in 1822 where town gas was manufactured by heating coal in the absence of air. This operated until 1850. The Windsor Street Gasworks was established in 1846 and remained in service after the company's takeover by the Birmingham Corporation in 1875 and then British Gas.

In 1874, the Mayor of Birmingham, Joseph Chamberlain, led the Council to buy out the company. An act of Parliament, the Birmingham (Corporation) Gas Act 1875 (38 & 39 Vict. c. clxxviii), was obtained in July 1875 and the Birmingham Corporation Gas Committee was set up.
