= Birmingham Junior Cup =

Cup competition for amateur teams

The Birmingham Junior Cup was a tournament for non-league clubs who were members of the Birmingham Football Association.

== Early years ==
The competition was set up by the Birmingham Junior Football Association, which grew to 50 member clubs by 1885. In its first season the competition was known as the Foresters Cup or Foresters Challenge Cup.

From 1883–84, second XIs of Birmingham Football Association members were allowed to enter, and the competition changed its name to the Birmingham Junior Cup. A decision in 1886 to allow former players from the "national cup" to take part in the Junior Cup opened up entries to stronger sides, although the second XIs were now excluded. This lasted until the 1892–93 season, when the Junior Association set up its own league, and as a result closed the competition off from many clubs (such as Singers) from equivalent leagues.

== Later incarnations ==
By 1969, the competition was known as the Saturday Junior Cup, and later became known as the Saturday Amateur Cup, restricted to clubs outside the football pyramid.

== List of 19th century winners ==
Season	Winners	Result	Runner-up	Notes	Ref(s)
1882–83	Aston Morning Star	4–0	Nechells Villa	At Aston Villa's Wellington Road ground	
1883–84	West Bromwich Albion reserves	10–1	Speedwell	At the Lyndon Recreation Ground, West Bromwich; Speedwell was ahead at half-time but played the second half a man short through injury	
1884–85	West Bromwich Albion reserves	1–0	Walsall Swifts reserves	At Wednesbury Old Athletic's Wood Green Oval	
1885–86	Perry Barr	2–1	Walsall Town reserves	At Birmingham Excelsior's Fentham Road ground before a "meagre" crowd	
1886–87	Langley Green Victoria	3–1	Unity Gas	At the Smethwick Carriage Works ground at Brasshouse Lane	
1887–88	Aston Victoria	2–0	Unity Gas	At Wellington Road	
1888–89	Aston Victoria	2–0	Wolverhampton Druids	At Wellington Road; after two 2–2 draws	
1889–90	Smethwick Carriage Works	2–0	Packington	At the Coventry Cricket Ground	
1890–91	Singers	1–0	Willenhall Pickwick	Singers now known as Coventry City; at Wellington Road	
1891–92	Singers	2–1	Willenhall Pickwick	At Wellington Road	
1892–93	Lozells	3–2	Park Mills	At the Aston Lower Grounds in front of a crowd of 3,500	
1893–94	Willenhall Pickwick	4–1	Lozells	At Molineux; after a 2–2 draw at the Lower Grounds	
1894–95	Walsall Unity	1–0	Windsor Street Gas	At Wellington Road in front of 6,000 spectators; updates from the 1895 FA Cup final (received by telegram) were paraded around the pitch during the match, albeit most updates turned out to be erroneous	
1895–96	Bilston United	2–1	Lozells	At Wellington Road	
1896–97	Rudge Whitworth	3–0	Warwick United	At the Aston Lower Grounds; the final game to take place at the venue	
1897–98	Darlaston	4–2	Hoobrook Olympic	At Villa Park; Darlaston came back from 2–0 down	
1898–99	Coombs Wood	3–2	Bournbrook	Replay at Small Heath's Coventry Road ground after a 1–1 draw at West Brom's Stoney Lane ground; Bournbrook was 2–0 up deep in the second half when reduced to 10 men through injury	
1899–1900	Bloxwich Strollers	2–1	Bournville Athletic	At Darlaston's City Ground in front of 4,000 spectators	
