= Crosswell's Brewery F.C. =

Crosswell's Brewery
- Full name: Crosswell's Brewery Football Club
- Nickname(s): the Tipplers
- Founded: 1885
- Dissolved: 1888
- Ground: Rood End

Crosswell's Brewery F.C. was an association football club from Oldbury, then in Worcestershire, active in the late 19th century.

== History ==
The club was the works side of Crosswell's Brewery and is first recorded playing in November 1885. In its first season the club entered the FA Cup, as well as local tournaments such as the Walsall Cup and the Birmingham Junior Cup for non-senior sides.

The club may have been funded by the brewery as a rival to the nearby Mitchell St George's football club, which was backed by the Mitchells & Butlers brewery in Smethwick. The club signed a number of players who had recently played for West Bromwich Albion and had them recognized by the Birmingham Football Association as amateurs. This was in time for them to play for the club in the Birmingham Senior Cup; the club had walked over Calthorpe in the first round, but lost 4–0 at Stoke in the second.

The move worked in the first round of the FA Cup, as the club surprisingly beat Burton Swifts away from home in the first round, scoring the only goal with a late rush through the posts right at the end of the match. In the second round however the club was destroyed 14–0 by Wolverhampton Wanderers, the Wolves' record win, nine goals coming in the first half, the score possibly explicable because of question marks raised about the eligibility of some of the players in the first round tie.

The club did recover quickly, gaining its own record win within the month by beating Dudley St Edmonds 23–0 in the Dudley Charity Cup. The competition provided the club with a high note on which to finish the 1886–87 season, as the club beat Darlaston All Saints 2–0 in the final (after an initial 1–1 draw), at West Bromwich Albion's Stoney Lane ground, having eliminated Walsall Swifts in the semi-final.

However nothing more is heard from the club, which did not enter any competitions in the following season. The formation of Oldbury Town may have diverted support and effort, as, on the latter's foundation, it claimed already to have a number of playing members, and the brewery seems to have cavilled at paying professional players as the Football League became a reality. The last reference to the club is a note that it had formally merged into the Town in September 1888. The brewery later set up a works side again, but with no pretensions of playing professional football, confining itself to local amateur competition.

== Ground ==
The club's ground was on the Bell Hotel grounds at Rood End.

== Notable players ==
- Jimmy Stanton and Fred Bunn, former West Bromwich Albion players who joined Oldbury Town in 1887
