= Walsall Unity F.C. =

Former association football club

- Full name: Walsall Unity Football Club
- Nickname: the Unitarians
- Founded: 1889 revived 1898
- Dissolved: 1897 re-dissolved 1900
- Ground: Wolverhampton Road
- Secretary: Theo. Simpson
Home colours

Walsall Unity F.C. was an association football club from Walsall, Staffordshire, active in the 1890s.

== History ==
A Walsall Unity existed in 1880, but the instant club is first recorded playing in 1889 and its first annual meeting took place in 1891. It started the 1890–91 season with a run of wins, including a 20–0 thrashing of Sandwell Rovers of Smethwick in the Summerfield Eclipse Cup in December, leading to the club being called "the little invincibles". It gained its first triumph that season, winning the Eclipse Cup by beating Small Heath Athletic 8–1 in the final, and finished the season with 33 wins and 1 defeat (to Walsall St John's) in 39 matches, and a profit of £6 4/ on an income of just under £19.

The club continued its strong form over the next seasons, although tended not to enter competitions, focussing on friendly matches; in one rare competition appearance, in the Walsall Hospital Charity Cup of 1892–93, the club reached the final at the Chuckery, but lost 2–1 to Brownhills Albion - put down to an injury to full-back Frankham in the second half. It finally stepped up to league competition in 1893–94, joining the Walsall and District League. The club had a respectable mid-table finish and made profits of £17 16/ on much higher income of just under £85.

=== Cup triumphs ===
Unity entered the Birmingham Junior Cup for the first time in 1894–95, and became the first club from Walsall to win the tournament. The final, against Windsor Street Gas at Aston Villa's Wellington Road ground, was held on the same day as the 1895 FA Cup final, and telegrammed updates were taken around the ground on boards for the benefit of the 6,000-strong crowd, although the updates turned out mostly erroneous, suggesting scores of up to 3–1 or 4–0 when only one goal was scored. There was also only one goal in the Junior Final, scored for Unity by outside-left Simpson just before half-time, nerves on the part of both sides being blamed for the game being poor. The Unitarians also won the Walsall Hospital Charity Cup the same season.

The club finished the 1895–96 season on a high, winning the Walsall Junior Cup for the first time, with a 2–1 win over Bloxwich Strollers, the club committee deciding to distribute the gate money amongst the players as a reward, all of whom promptly signed on for the following season. It also reached the final of the Charity Cup again, going down to Hednesford Town in a replay.

=== Collapse and brief revival ===
However, the club collapsed at the start of the 1896–97 season; it had arranged to move to a new ground closer to the centre of town, but the arrangement collapsed, and the club's future was in serious doubt. It survived only by merging with Pleck St John's, who had a ground on Darlaston Road near the Brown Lion inn, but a number of its players had already found employment elsewhere because of the uncertainty. It finished 8th out of 10 in the Walsall League and the club was wound up in August 1897.

The club was re-founded in 1898, and (re-)joined the Walsall and District League, but the revival was not successful; in the Wolverhampton Charity Cup for example the club was trounced 13–0 by Willenhall Pickwick. Its ultimate demise was a consequence of a falling-out with its landlord. The club originally used the Four Ways Inn at Birchill as its headquarters, owned by Herbert Tuckley, but when the club decided at the start of 1899 to shift its operations to another public house, Tuckley intercepted the rent demand for the ground, paid it, and claimed that he had usurped the tenancy; he then removed the ground equipment to stop the club playing. Although Tuckley was forced to give way, the club never properly recovered, and did not see out the 1899–1900 season.

The name was re-used in 1911 when Walsall United changed its name.

== Colours ==
The club wore white shirts and blue (serge) knickers. Whether coincidental or not, these were the same colours as the old Walsall Town club.

== Ground ==
The original club played on Wolverhampton Road before spending its final season at Darlaston Road. The 1898–99 incarnation also played at a ground on the Wolverhampton Road, with the entrance at Pargeter Street.

== Nickname ==
The club was often referred to as the Unitarians, although, confusingly, another club called Walsall Unitarians, playing on the West Bromwich Road, started up in 1893.

== Honours ==
- Birmingham Junior Cup
  - Winner: 1894–95
- Walsall Junior Cup
  - Winner: 1895–96
- Walsall Hospital Charity Cup
  - Winner: 1894–95
  - Runner-up: 1892–93, 1895–96

== Notable players ==
- Notable players ( 6 )

William "Artful" Taylor played for the club before joining Walsall Town Swifts; after a broken leg in his debut, he was moved back from centre-forward to centre-half, where he proved effective. He died of pleurisy attributed to a chill caught in a match against Liverpool in April 1897.
