= Jimmy Stanton =

English footballer

Personal information
- Full name: James Stanton
- Date of birth: 18 November 1860
- Place of birth: West Bromwich, England
- Date of death: August 1932 (aged 71)
- Place of death: At sea
- Positions: Full back; wing half

Senior career*
Years	Team	Apps	(Gls)
1878–1885	West Bromwich Albion		
1885–1886	Newton Heath L&YR		
1886–1887	Crosswell's Brewery		
1887–1892	Oldbury Town		
- * Club domestic league appearances and goals

James Stanton (18 November 1860 – August 1932) was an English footballer who played at full back or wing half. He was born in West Bromwich and attended Christ Church School, before working at the local George Salter's Spring Works. He joined the factory's football team, the West Bromwich Strollers, in 1878 and played in the club's first match (vs. Hudson's) in November of that year. Stanton continued to play for the club after their change of name to West Bromwich Albion in 1879. In 1883 he played in Albion's first FA Cup match, against Wednesbury Old Athletic.

West Bromwich Albion held a testimonial match for Stanton on 16 May 1885; the team lost 1–2 to a district XI. He then moved to Newton Heath L&YR, where he made three competitive appearances (all in the Manchester & District Challenge Cup) as well as appearing in 10 friendlies.

After playing for Crosswell's Brewery (1886–1887), Stanton finished his playing career at Oldbury Town (1887–1892). He died at sea in August 1932.
