= Wolverhampton Druids F.C. =

Defunct association football club (1887–90)

Wolverhampton Druids
- Full name: Wolverhampton Druids Football Club
- Nickname: the Druids
- Founded: 1887
- Dissolved: 1890
- Ground: Culwell Street
- Secretary: W. A. Knight
Home colours

Wolverhampton Druids F.C. was an association football club from Wolverhampton, then in Staffordshire, which briefly was one of the leading non-league clubs in England.

== History ==
Although there was a Wolverhampton Druids club active in the 1880–81 season, the instant club was founded in 1887. It saw a rapid improvement in form; after losing to New Meeting of Kidderminster by the only goal in one of its first matches, it won the return fixture by 14 goals to 1 in March 1888.

It first played competitive football in the 1888–89 season, joining the Birmingham Football Association and the Walsall Football Association.

The 1888–89 season proved to be the club's only full season, and it reached the final of the Birmingham Junior Cup, meeting the holder Aston Victoria. The match was only settled in a second replay, after a pair of 2–2 draws, the first at Aston Villa's Wellington Road in Perry Barr and the second at Wolverhampton Wanderers' Molineux. Back at Perry Barr, the Vics beat the Druids 2–0, a crowd of 2,000 enjoying hot weather more than the players "who looked parboiled before they had been at it many minutes".

Its success meant that it was one of the clubs invited to join the new Birmingham and District League, to start in the 1889–90 season, and the club was considered much stronger than before, having taken over a number of other sides. However, the club declined to participate in the League, and collapsed quickly; in January 1890 was described as "gone to smash". This was at least in part to players leaving the area, A. H. Knight moved to London and full-back Frederick Collins to Kent. The last appearance of the club was in the Walsall Junior Cup in December 1889, beating Tipton Lancers, but the Cup committee ordering a replay as the game finished in darkness; the replay never seems to have been played.

== Colours ==
The club described its colours as "black, white, and blue", which in the context probably refers to black and white stripes with serge knickers.

== Ground ==
The club's ground was on Culwell Street in Springfields, 200 yards from Wolverhampton railway station.
