= Gas Street Central =

Former gasworks, now church, in Birmingham, England

Coordinates: 52°28′35.78″N 1°54′34.63″W

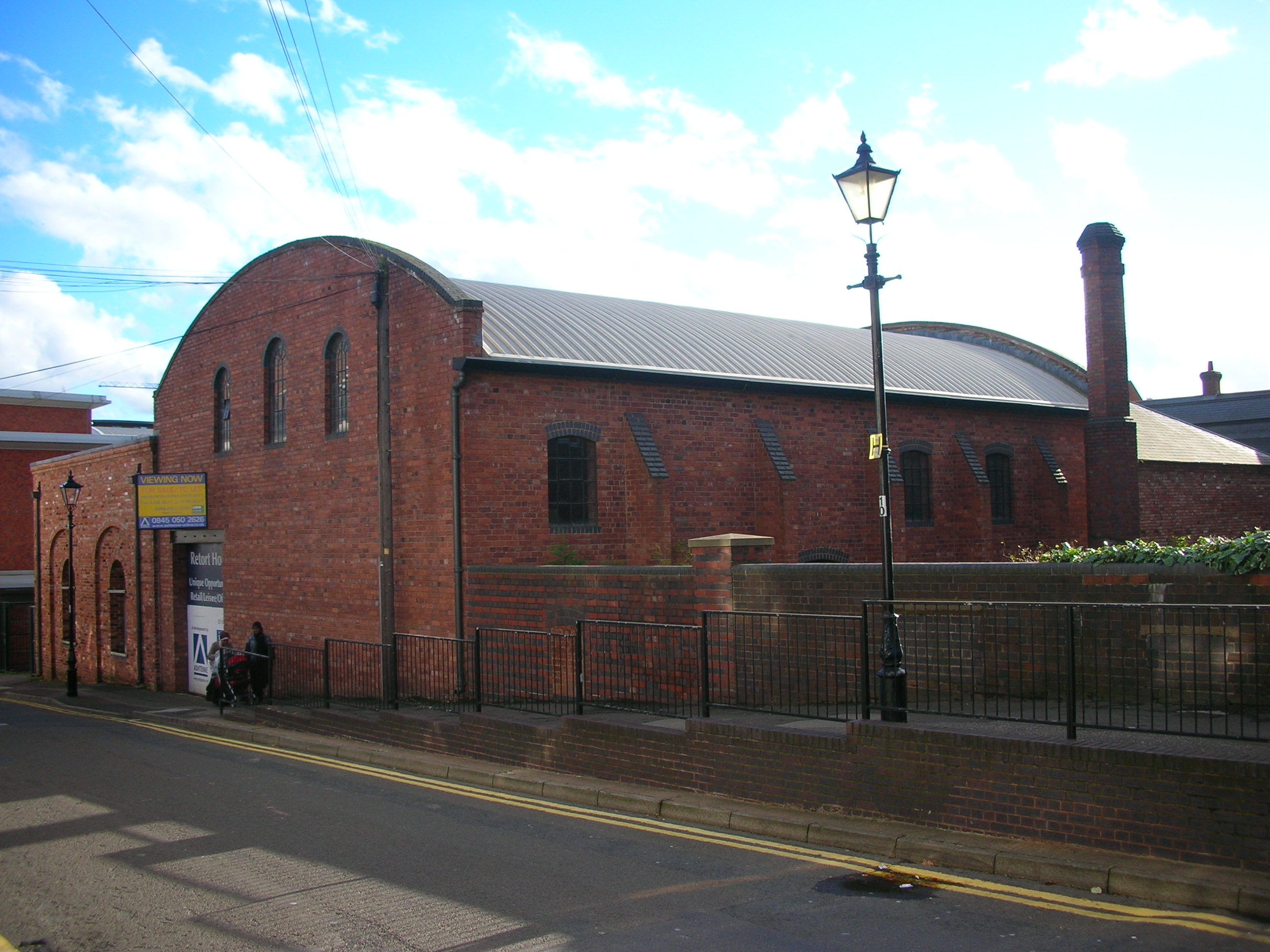
- Gas Street Central
- Location: Birmingham
- Denomination: Church of England
- Churchmanship: Charismatic Evangelical
- Website: https://gasstreet.church

History
- Former name: Gas Street St Luke's
- Status: Open
- Founded: 5 February 2016

Administration
- Parish: St Luke's Edgbaston

Clergy
- Pastor: Tim Hughes

Gas Street Central is a Church of England church, part of the HTB network, in Birmingham, England. It is a vibrant city-centre resource church.

== History ==
The Gas Retort House (grid reference SP062865) at 39 Gas Street, Birmingham, is the last remaining building of Birmingham's first gas works.

It was rediscovered in 1992 during a proposed redevelopment of land on Gas Street when the city planning department noticed the unusual roof design of cast iron trusses and wrought iron rods.

Following a tender in 1816 by the Birmingham Street Commissioners for the provision of gas street lighting the only respondent, John Gosling of London, was engaged to supply 10 streets. He formed the Birmingham Gas Light and Coke Company and built his first works on Gas Street in 1817-18 using gas plant installed by Samuel Clegg, the first expert in gas engineering. Clegg was apprenticed to William Murdoch at the Boulton and Watt Company and in 1813 was the first engineer at the Chartered Gas Light and Coke Company, building the first public gas works in Westminster.

The retort house, the place where the town gas was manufactured by heating coal in the absence of air, was built next to the canal in 1822 to replace the original Clegg plant together with a new gas holder (storage tank) and coal store. It was designed by Alexander Smith.

The works closed in 1850, retaining the four 52-foot gas holders, which were fed by other factories. The whole site closed in 1879 following Joseph Chamberlain's 1875 municipalisation of the Birmingham gas companies.

The building was refurbished in 1998–99 by Crosby Homes (Adrian Unitt and Kevin Cooper) using Richard Johnson & Associates as architects as a non-residential office, leisure or workshop space. It is a Grade II* listed building. The adjoining land that housed the gas holders was redeveloped at the same time for exclusive apartments.

In 2010 the building was declared to be "at risk" by English Heritage. It was removed from the at-risk status in 2011 following refurbishment by the then owners Ashtenne. The structure was unoccupied at the time and was put up for sale. The retort house was purchased by The Church of England in December 2014 as a second place of worship in the Parish of St Luke's. It underwent a comprehensive renovation, led by APEC Architects. This included renovation of the adjoining buildings on the site to form a 450-person capacity main auditorium, along with a foyer/cafe fronting Gas Street, and ancillary offices in a block facing Bridge Street. It is the main venue for a Resourcing Church, in partnership with Holy Trinity Brompton and the Anglican Diocese of Birmingham, and is targeted to reach Birmingham's students and young adults.
