= Aston Victoria F.C. =

Defunct association football club (1881–92)

Aston Victoria
- Full name: Aston Victoria Football Club
- Nicknames: the Victorians, the Little Vics
- Founded: 1881
- Dissolved: 1892
- Ground: Aston Lower Grounds
- Secretary: 1883: T. A. Randle; 1888: Arthur Cooknell
Home colours

Aston Victoria Football Club was an English football club from Aston, then in Warwickshire, England.

== History ==
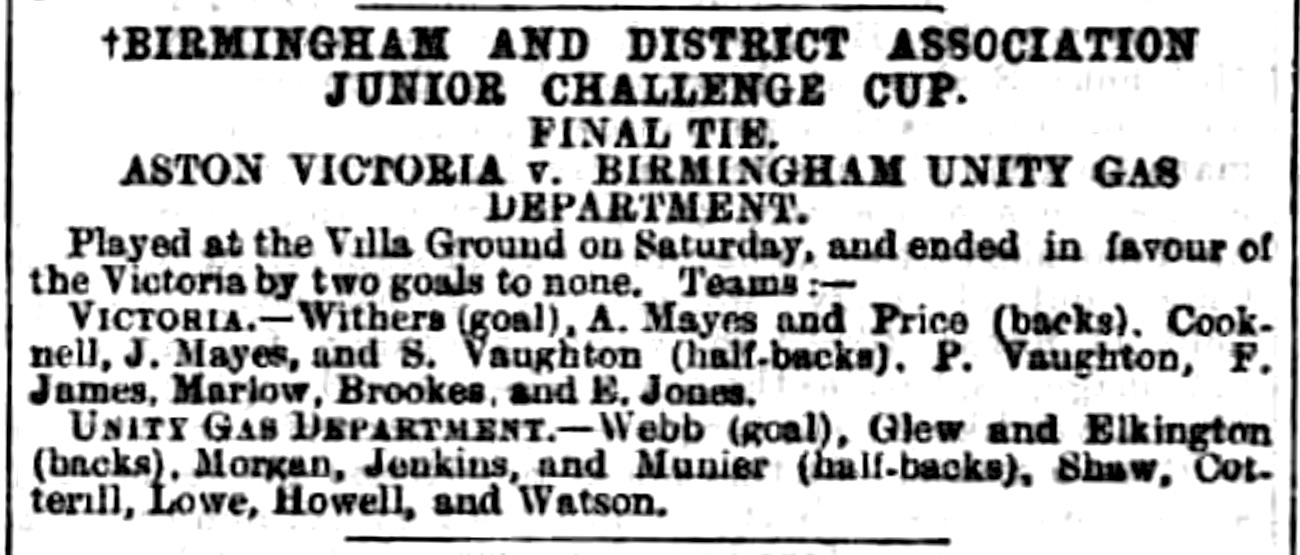
The Aston Victoria and Unity Gas Dept teams for the 1887–88 Birmingham Junior Cup final, Sporting Life, 28 March 1888

Although an Aston Victoria club was in existence from at least September 1881 to 1885, playing at Aston Park, the instant club was founded as Aston Douglas F.C., also in 1881; it joined the Walsall and District Association in 1882, and lost in the Walsall Cup to the much more established St George's club, albeit only by three goals, and despite fielding only 10 men. The club nearly wound up after the 1885–86 season, but revived itself by taking over the Aston Victoria name.

The club only tentatively entered the Birmingham Junior Cup in 1887–88, but, to some surprise, emerged as victor. The final, against Unity Gas at the Wellington Road ground, was considered a step too far for the younger side, heavily outweighed by the Gasmen; but an early goal for the Victorians caused panic and nerves in the Unity Gas side, and Sidney Vaughton (an 18 year old architect's clerk, and brother of Villa player Howard Vaughton) soon added a second and final goal. The Little Vics' triumph was credited to "brilliant dribbling, pretty combination and accurate shooting". The club retained its title in 1888–89, beating Wolverhampton Druids 2–0 in a second replay at Wellington Road, a crowd of 2,000 enjoying hot weather more than the players "who looked parboiled before they had been at it many minutes".

With the professional clubs in Birmingham now playing in the Football League or Football Alliance, the Little Vics decided to invite clubs of a similar stature to form a competition of their own, the Birmingham and District League, to start in 1889–90. The club invited six others - Kidderminster Harriers, Kidderminster Olympic, Stourbridge Olympic, Singers, Unity Gas Department, and Wolverhampton Druids - with a view to inviting further clubs for a 12 team league. Eventually a dozen clubs stepped up, and the Victoria's half-back Arthur Cooknell - a mere 19 years old at the time - elected as honorary secretary, a role he retained until his death in 1936, with William MacGregor accepting the post of President). Although Kidderminster Olympic topped the final table, no championship was awarded as a number of fixtures had not been completed.

The same season, the club entered the Birmingham Senior Cup for the first time, and was drawn to host Warwick County in the first qualifying round but the club took "a monetary solatium" to switch the tie to the County's Edgbaston Cricket Ground. The Little Vics took the lead, but the more expensively assembled hosts came back to win 3–1.

At the start of the 1890–91 season, with the club's move to Edgbaston Cricket Ground, the club renamed itself County Victoria, although the name only stuck for one season. The new name did not bring the club much luck, as it was 9th out of 10 in the League when the competition, once more, fizzled out. It also received an 8–1 hammering from Wednesbury Old Athletic in its Birmingham Senior Cup qualifying round tie, only scoring a consolation with a deflected shot near the end.

The move to the Aston Lower Grounds required another name change, this time to Birmingham Victoria, a name which had been used by newspapers outside Birmingham in from 1888, although the name did not stick, and before long newspapers were re-using the Aston Victoria title. The club had a successful 1891–92 season, ranking third in the Birmingham and District League (although a sub-strength Vics side lost 9–0 at Brierley Hill Alliance in a Birmingham Senior Cup first qualifying round tie, having had to forfeit home advantage due to the Lower Grounds not being in a fit state), but it disintegrated over the summer, with most of its players joining other clubs. A scratch team was got together for the 1892–93 Birmingham Senior Cup first qualifying round tie with Wellington St Georges, the Saints persuading the Vics to forfeit home advantage, and the Shropshire side won 10–0. There is no further record of the club.

== Colours ==
The club described its colours as blue and white.

== Ground ==
The club originally played on Aston Manor. After the fading away of Birmingham Excelsior, the Victorians moved into its Fentham Road ground.

In 1890, the club moved to Edgbaston Cricket Ground, shared with Warwick County, as the senior club looked to host senior, junior, and rugby football for one admission fee. The experiment did not work for the Little Vics - on one occasion, when Warwick, Victoria, and the Old Edwardians R.F.C. were playing, the Warwick and Edwardian matches had healthy attendances, while the Victoria match was watched "by two men and a child". The club therefore secured an arrangement to use the Aston Lower Grounds from the 1891–92 season.

== Notable players ==
Goalkeepers Len Benwell and G. Stevenson joined Aston Villa at the end of the 1891–92 season. Two brothers of Howard Vaughton - Sidney and Phil - played for the club's Junior Cup-winning side.

== Honours ==
- Birmingham Junior Cup
  - Winner: 1887–88, 1888–89
