= Windsor Street Gasworks =

Former coal gas and coke manufacturing site in Birmingham, UK

Coordinates: 52°29′35.6″N 1°52′49.7″W

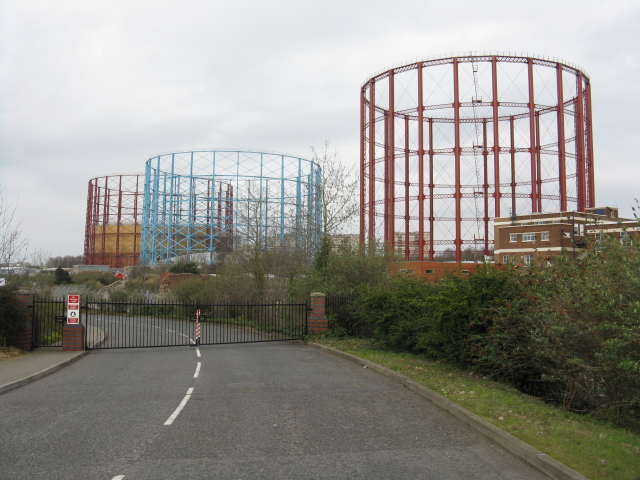
The Windsor Street gasholders pictured in 2009

The Windsor Street Gasworks was a coal gas and coke manufacturing site in Nechells, Birmingham. The works were constructed in 1846 for the Birmingham Gas Light and Coke Company adjacent to the Birmingham and Fazeley Canal to allow for the bulk import of coal. The company was taken over by the Birmingham Corporation in 1875 and under mayor Joseph Chamberlain and engineer Charles Hunt the Windsor Street site was expanded and connected to the London and North Western Railway. Hunt's works included the construction, in 1885, of gasholders No. 13 and No.14, the largest in the world at that time, as well as modernisation of production.

The Corporation continued to develop the site in the early 20th century and it became home to the largest continuous vertical retort set-up in the world. It was also the first to utilise steam from the retorts to help power machinery on the site. Gasholder No. 12, higher than No. 13 and 14, was built in 1934. The gasworks transferred to the West Midlands Gas Board during nationalisation in 1948 and, later to British Gas. The site ended production in 1974 due to the availability of natural gas from the North Sea. The three large gasholders remained in use until 2012 and became a familiar landmark, painted in the colours of local football club Aston Villa F.C. Now owned by National Grid plc, the gasholders were demolished in 2021–2022.

== Birmingham Gas Light and Coke Company ==
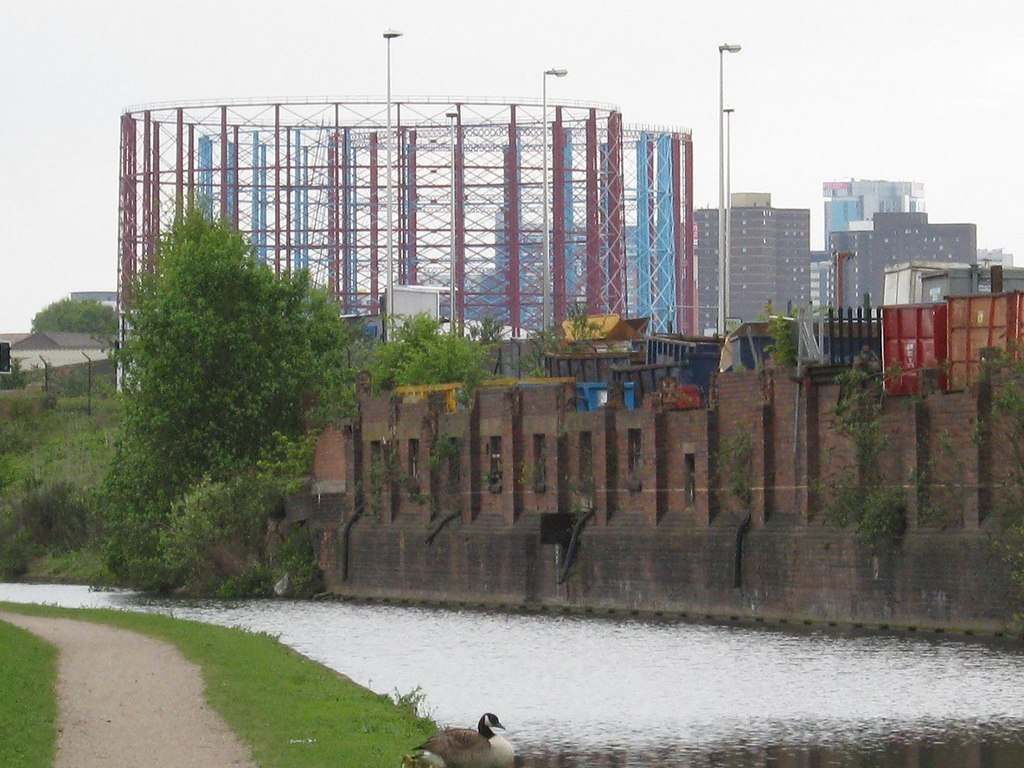
2010 photograph showing proximity to the canal

The gas gasworks were built by the Birmingham Gas Light and Coke Company from 1846. It was part of the company's plan to move gas production out of the city centre. The Windsor Street works was the part of a string of four gasworks running east from Windsor Street to Washwood Heath. The new site replaced a number of smaller works in the city centre which produced coal gas and coke from the controlled burning of coal in the absence of oxygen.

The Windsor Street site was chosen for its proximity to the Aston locks on the Birmingham and Fazeley Canal which would allow for the easy import of coal and export of by-products such as coke, which was used as a smokeless domestic and industrial fuel. By 1864 the site had three retort houses for coal gasification and four gasholders for storage. By 1872 the site had another retort house and 11 gasholders (with a total capacity of 3,568,000 cubic feet, 101,000 m^{3}) as well as 20 gas purifiers.

Charles Hunt joined the Birmingham Gas Light and Coke Company as chief engineer in 1872, at the unusually young age of 30. At this time the company was in financial difficulty due to embezzlement by the company secretary and competition with the Birmingham and Staffordshire Gas Light Company. Hunt's works to reduce leakage from the distribution pipes and developing larger retorts at Windsor Street, which improved production efficiency, helped to revive the company's position.

== Birmingham Corporation ==
=== Chamberlain and Hunt ===
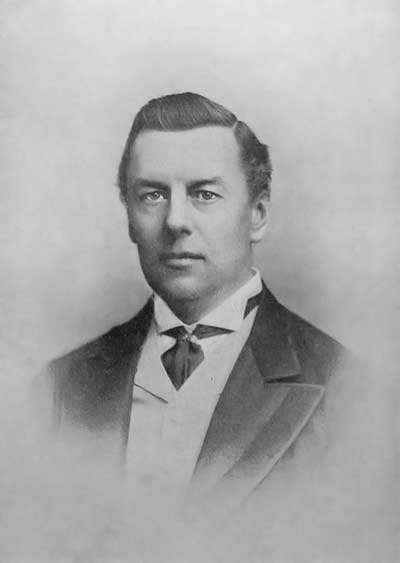
Chamberlain pictured circa 1900

In 1875 the Birmingham Corporation, under reforming mayor Joseph Chamberlain, bought both the city's gas companies and founded the publicly owned Birmingham Corporation Gas Department. At this time the Windsor Street gasworks measured 4 acres (1.6 ha) in size. This was relatively small for a gasworks and the site would probably have closed if Chamberlain had not arranged for its expansion through the purchase of an adjoining market garden. Chamberlain also negotiated the release of some of this land to the London and North Western Railway in return for the construction of a branch line to the works. This line, completed in 1880, allowed greater access to the works for import and export.

Hunt had joined the new Gas Department and oversaw the expansion of the Windsor Street works to meet increasing demand for gas. He was aided by Chamberlain, who moved on to higher political offices but always retained an interest in the Windsor Street site. An 80 feet (24 m) tall gasholder, known as No. 12, was built on the southern part of the site in 1877. This was designed by Hunt and built by Messrs Thomas Piggott & Company Ltd with cast iron columns and wrought iron girders, it was 70 feet (21 m) high and had a capacity of 2,000,000 cubic feet (57,000 m^{3}). Between 1880 and 1885 Hunt oversaw the complete rebuilding of the gasworks. This included construction of twin gasholders (No. 13 and 14) to the east of the site, each with a capacity of 6,500,000 cubic feet (180,000 m^{3}) and measuring 236 feet (72 m) in diameter and 165 feet (50 m) in height. In preparation for the expansion Hunt took the Corporation Gas Committee to visit the newly built 5,250,000 cubic feet (149,000 m^{3}) gasholder at the London Old Kent Road Gasworks. After this visit the committee approved Hunt's plans. The gasholders were the largest in the world when finished in 1885.

Engineer Thomas Hawksley was critical of Hunt's plans for larger gasholders, suggesting that he proposed putting "too many eggs in one basket". Hunt replied "but don't you think that there are too many baskets for the eggs", referring to the numerous smaller gasholders then in use at the site. Hunt's approach to use larger, but fewer, gasholders was afterwards generally followed by the industry.

No. 13 and 14 gasholders were placed very close together, sharing a single 7 feet (2.1 m) wall separating their below ground water tanks. Their construction was hampered by poor ground conditions. Hunt's redevelopment included a new retort house, measuring 487 by 210 feet (148 m × 64 m) and containing 756 retorts. This was built to Hunt's design by the West Gas Improvement Company of Manchester and included the latest in regenerative furnaces. A canal branch and two levels of railway ran into the house to deliver coal and remove coke. The redevelopment expanded the on site railway lines to 4.5 miles (7.2 km) in length. Only two retort houses and five gasholders were unaffected by Hunt's redevelopment, which left the works the largest in Birmingham and among the largest in the country.

=== Later developments ===
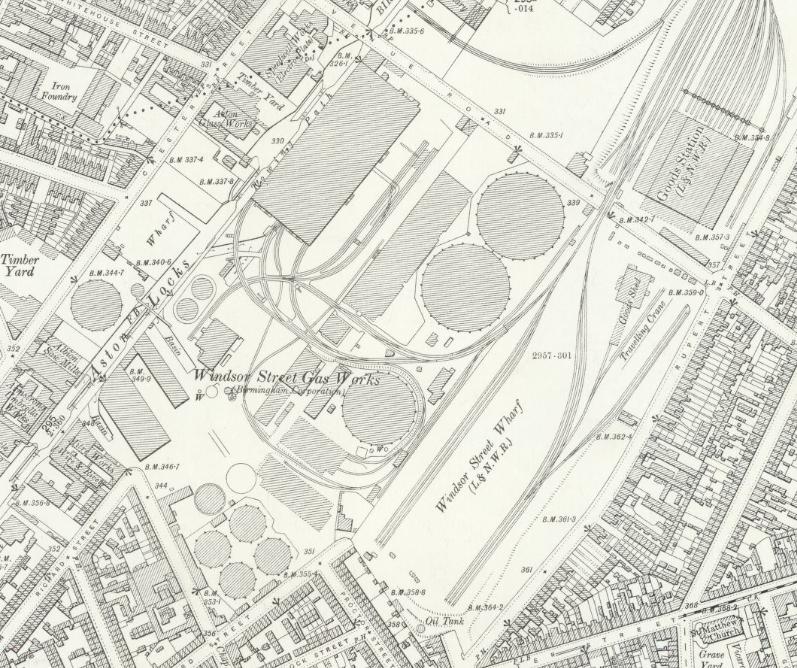
Windsor street gasworks on a 1902 OS map

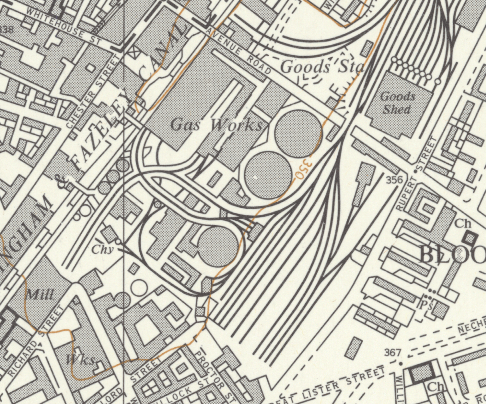
Windsor street gasworks on a 1967 OS map

Hunt left the corporation in 1902 but improvements to the Windsor Street Gasworks continued. From 1903 coal testing plants were installed at the works to assess the quality of coal delivered. Continuous vertical retorts (CVR), built by Woodall-Duckham, were trialled from 1912 to replace the horizontal retorts used previously. CVRs allowed for continuous production with coal being added at the top and coke removed, rather than the less productive batch system in horizontal retorts. By 1928 the whole site had been switched to CVRs, which was at the time the single largest CVR set-up in the world.

The site was the first to utilise excess heat from the CVRs to produce steam to power pumps and generators on the site. Coal tar was recovered at a coal drying plant for use in the corporation's road works. Prussian blue cyanogen salt was produced from the cyanide recovered from the gas at the rate of around 2 pounds (0.91 kg) per 1 long ton (1.0 t) of coal consumed. This was used in the local metal industry, though production became uneconomic and ceased in 1922. During the First World War (1914–1918) 34 of the Windsor Street Gasworks employees lost their lives whilst serving with the British armed forces. By 1928 the gasworks was the largest in the corporation's ownership.

It took some time for retorts to be brought online to meet any increase in demand and the gasholders at Windsor Street played an important role in providing gas while retorts were heated. Carburetted water gas plants, powered using waste steam and which could produce poor quality gas quicker, were installed. In 1934 gasholder No. 12 was replaced to increase storage capacity. The new 180 feet (55 m) high gasholder was built by Messrs Clayton Son and Company Ltd of Leeds and reused the water tank from the old structure, though its 5,000,000 imperial gallons (23,000,000 L; 6,000,000 US gal) of water had to be pumped out. The old No. 12 structure was dismantled, with a worker having to climb inside the columns to loosen the bolts from inside, and the scrap removed by rail. Construction of the new structure took 9.5 months and required 5,000 steel plates, 14,000 bolts and 1,000,000 rivets. The new gasholder was coated with aluminium as corrosion protection, giving a striking silver colour.

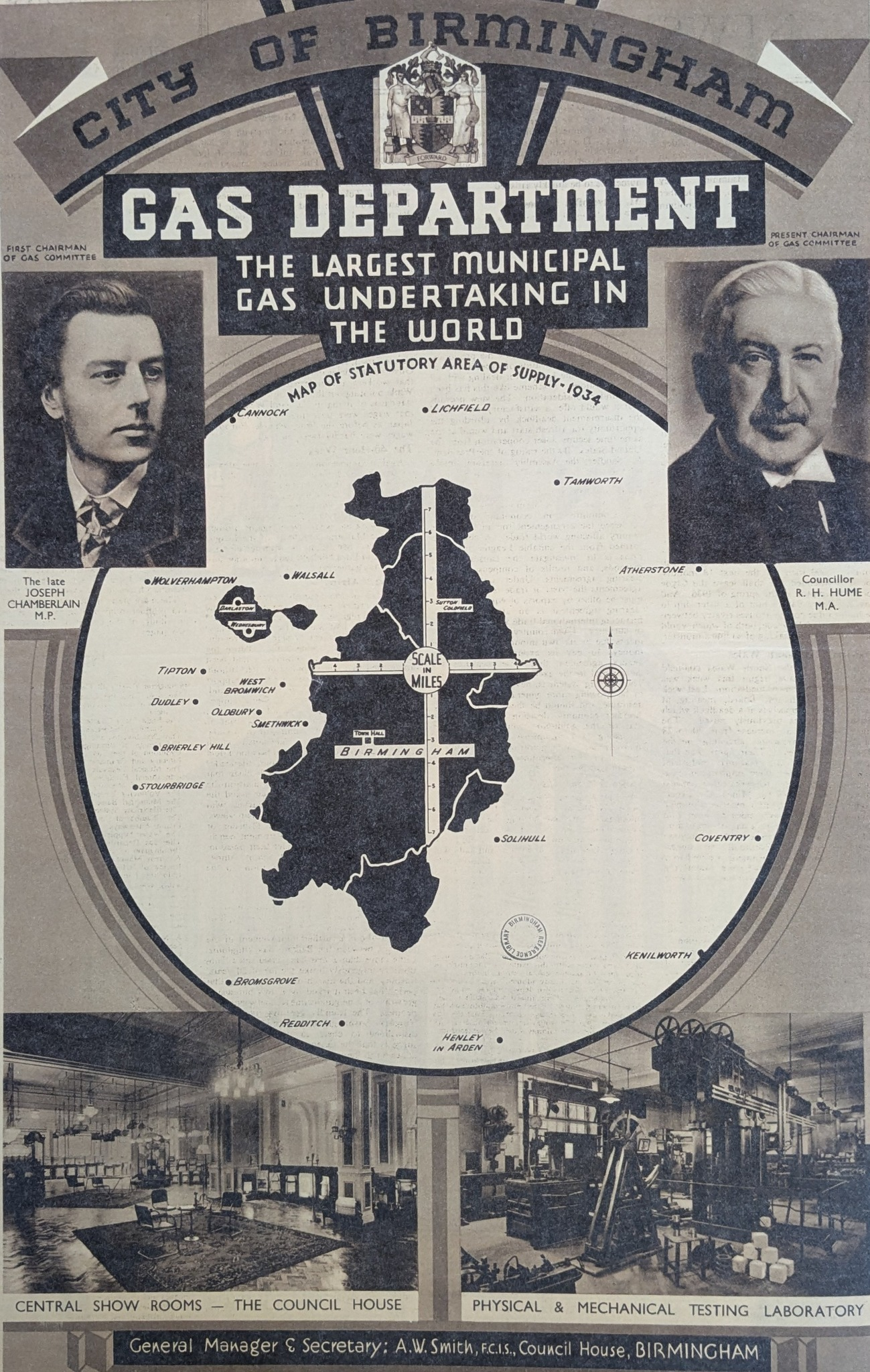
City of Birmingham Gas Department brochure, 1934

In 1936 the corporation built offices and a workshop for its maintenance team on the gasworks site, over the remains of seven former gasholders. This was the first time that the maintenance had been brought together at one location by the corporation.

== Nationalisation and closure ==
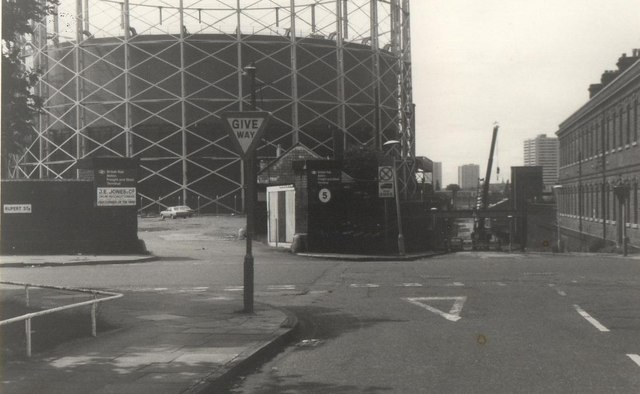
View from Rupert Street/Avenue Road junction, 1979. Looking across the former gasworks railway yard to the surviving gasholders.

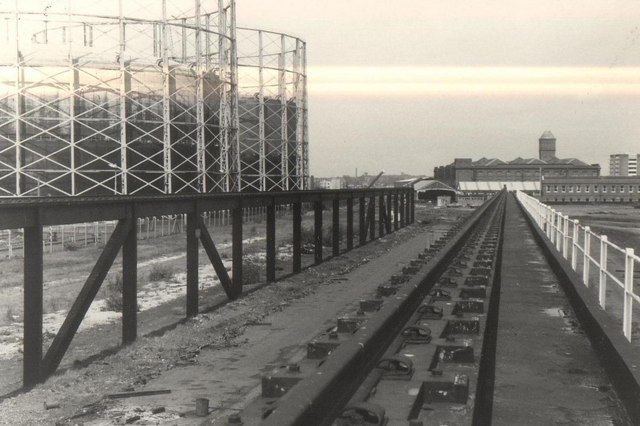
View of the surviving gasholders from a crane in the site's goods yard, 1979.

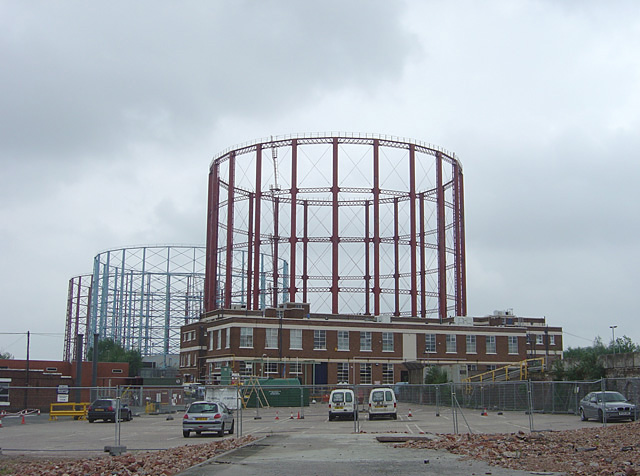
Ongoing demolition at the gasworks, 2006

The Birmingham Corporation Gas Department, alongside all other local authority gas providers, was nationalised in 1949. It became part of the West Midlands Gas Board and, from 1972, was part of British Gas. The manufacture of coal gas ceased at Windsor Street in 1974 as by then plentiful supplies of natural gas were available from the North Sea fields. The site's gasholders remained in use as a means of gas storage. Three surviving gasholders, No. 12, 13 and 14, have, since the 1980s, been painted in the claret and blue colours of Aston Villa F.C., the local football team. It is not known why this is the case but it is thought that the engineer in charge of maintenance chose the colours as he was an Aston Villa supporter, it may be linked to their victory in the 1982 European Cup Final. The gasholders were a highly visible local landmark, being seen by thousands of Aston Expressway motorists every day.

The Windsor Street site transferred to Transco/Lattice Group when the transmission business was split out of British Gas in 2000. The business was bought by National Grid plc in 2002. Two of the smaller gasholder tanks, surviving under a car park on the site, were excavated and demolished in 2008. In the course of the works a third tank, previously unknown, was also demolished and significant ground contamination discovered. Birmingham Archaeology provided supervision during these and further works in 2010 that led to the recording of the potential remains of the purifier bases, boilers, a steam engine and a scrubber unit.

Gasholders No. 12, 13 and 14 were taken out of service in 2012, as the majority of gas storage requirements are now met through the transmission pipeline network. The Windsor Street structures were the last active gasholders in Birmingham. The gasholders were earmarked for demolition as part of National Grid's nationwide policy of removing such structures. Work started in February 2021 and will include removing water, oil and sludge from inside before cutting away the steel structure and removing pieces by crane. During Birmingham Heritage Week in September 2021 visitors were given the opportunity to look inside the water tanks at the base of the gasholders. Demolition works completed in 2022. A plate connecting gasholders No. 13 & No. 14 was added to the collection of the Thinktank Birmingham Science Museum, it is painted blue on one side and red on the other. In its 'Our Future City: Central Birmingham Framework 2040 document Birmingham City Council identified the gas works for redevelopment into an environmentally-sustainable neighbourhood, connected with a new highway and linear park.
