= Crosswell's Brewery =

Former brewery in Oldbury, England

Crosswells Brewery was a brewery in Oldbury, then in Worcestershire, operational from the mid-19th century until 1914.

== History ==
Walter Showell (born 1833) started his brewery company in the mid-19th century. In 1866 he built a brewery over the Crosswell springs in Oldbury. The brewery was successful, claiming its use of pure water direct from the springs helped its beer, and by the late 1880s the company was making profits of over £25,000 per year.

The company was sold in 1914 to Allsopp & Sons of Burton-upon-Trent, who supplied its ales to pubs tied to the Showell company. The brewery was operated by Ind Coope and Wolverhampton & Dudley Brewery until 2006, the buildings then being sold for flats; they were however attacked by arsonists in 2009.

== Sport ==
The brewery had an association football club, Crosswell's Brewery F.C., which played first-class football in the late 1880s.
