= Oldbury Town F.C. =

Oldbury Town
- Full name: Oldbury Town Football Club
- Nickname(s): Town
- Founded: 1887
- Dissolved: 1907
- Ground: Birmingham Road
- Chairman: Benjamin Hingley MP
Home colours

Oldbury Town Football Club was an English football club from Oldbury, then in Worcestershire.

== History ==
The success of the Crosswell's Brewery works side in the 1886–87 FA Cup, and the number of people from the town who went to West Bromwich Albion for the latter's home games, led businessmen in Oldbury to consider setting up a side for the town. There were two separate groups; one led by a Mr Morton of the Bell Hotel, which proposed Brooke Robinson, Member of Parliament for Dudley, as the club president, and one led by a Mr Garbett, who proposed renting a ground in Low Town from the Chance Brothers firm. The latter organization won out and Benjamin Hingley, MP for Oldbury's constituency of North Worcestershire, accepted a role as President.

The club immediately entered the FA Cup in its own right, although there was some confusion in the media, listing the club's entry as under the name of Crosswells; the support for the latter club seems to have transferred to the more inclusive Oldbury, which claimed to be the successor club to Crosswells. In the first round the club was drawn against Aston Villa, and a 4–0 home defeat against the Cup holders was not disgraceful in the circumstances; indeed Town kept the score to two until the last ten minutes, and had a goal disallowed.

The club also got to the quarter-finals of the Birmingham Senior Cup, only losing 2–0 to Wolverhampton Wanderers. In 1888–89 the club beat Nottingham Forest 4-1 in the third round but lost to Stoke in the last sixteen. At the close of the season however the club lost captain Bradbury to Birmingham St George's.

Despite this promising start, and another quarter-final appearance in the Birmingham Senior Cup in 1890–91 (losing 1–0 at a briefly resurgent Wednesbury Old Athletic), the club had been founded too late to be a success; with established clubs all around them, Town, lacking the track record to join a national league, joined the Birmingham and District League instead. Although a top three side in the first two seasons, by 1897 the club was struggling to compete.

The club's final league season was in the Birmingham Junior League in 1906–07, in which the club won precisely one match; its final game, against Bournville Athletic. The club was not re-elected and seems to have wound up, although a new club, Oldbury F.C., was formed in 1915. This club, which played at the old Town ground, and also wore blue, was often called Oldbury Town.

== Colours ==
The club played in light and dark blue.

== Ground ==
The Low Town ground's official address was Birmingham Road; it was close to Anchor Bridge, between the road and the canal.

== Notable players ==
- Notable players ( 11 )
