= West Bromwich Albion F.C. former grounds =

List of former club grounds of West Brom

From their formation in 1878 as West Bromwich Strollers, until their move to The Hawthorns in 1900, West Bromwich Albion F.C. occupied five different grounds. All of these early grounds were close to the centre of West Bromwich.

== List of grounds ==
=== Cooper's Hill ===
The club's first ground, Cooper's Hill was situated between Walsall Street and Beeches Road. The site is now occupied by St Philip's Church.

=== Dartmouth Park ===
From 1879 to 1881, Albion played additionally at Dartmouth Park, appearing to alternate between here and Cooper's Hill during this time. A local pub, the Globe Inn on Reform Street, served as the teams' changing rooms.

=== Bunn's Field ===
Albion's third ground was at Bunn's Field. The ground became known as The Birches, and the team played there for a single season in 1881–82. With a capacity of between 1,500 and 2,000, it was their first enclosed ground, allowing the club to charge an entrance fee for the first time.

=== Four Acres ===
The increasing popularity of football led the well-established West Bromwich Dartmouth Cricket Club to rent their Four Acres ground to Albion from 1882 to 1885. The cricket club allowed football to be played there only on Saturdays and Mondays. The ground was the venue for the biggest win in Albion's history, when on 11 November 1882 they beat Coseley 26–0. The record attendance at Four Acres was 16,393, for an FA Cup match between Albion and Blackburn Rovers in February 1885. Albion quickly outgrew their new home and soon needed to move again. The Four Acres ground is now Park Crescent, off Seagar St.

=== Stoney Lane ===
Albion's tenure of Stoney Lane, from 1885 to 1900, was arguably the most successful period in the club's history, as the club won the FA Cup twice and were runners-up three times. The club built a wooden grandstand that became known as the "Noah's Ark". The stand had a capacity of over 2,000 people and was later transported to The Hawthorns when the club moved there in 1900. It was destroyed by fire on Guy Fawkes Night, 1904.

The first league game at Stoney Lane took place on 29 September 1888, when Albion beat Burnley 4–3. The ground's record attendance of 20,977 was set in March 1895, for Albion's 1–0 victory over Wolves in the FA Cup third round. Albion played their last game at Stoney Lane on 16 April 1900, beating Nottingham Forest 8–0 in front of 5,187 spectators. The expiry of the lease on Stoney Lane, as well as the club's desire for a more spacious location, saw them move once again in 1900. They moved to The Hawthorns, which has been their home ground ever since.
