= 1876–77 Aston Villa F.C. season =

Aston Villa
1876–77 season
- Secretary: Charlie H. Midgley

The 1876–77 English football season was Aston Villa's third season, twelve years before the creation of the Football League.

Wellington Road was opened in 1876 when Aston Villa moved to the ground. There were initially no spectator facilities; players changed in a nearby blacksmith's shed, and a hayrick was kept on the pitch, which had to be removed prior to matches. The Club was able to field more than one team, reaping gate money even when the first-team played away from home. The pitch had a slope away from one goal, There were no groundsmen and the pitch was grazed prior to a game. and play was hampered by a hedge and three trees along the touchline. There was no money available so, instead of Saturday training, the players themselves felled the trees. They sold the wood to finance fencing and a gate which they erected themselves, enabling them to charge twopence admission. The first gate amounted to 6s 7½d. Charlie Johnstone recalled that the team retired to the Crown & Cushion pub with the first takings. The pub would serve as changing rooms and club house.

George Ramsay came to join Aston Villa by chance shortly after arriving in Birmingham. One day in 1876, whilst taking a stroll in Aston Park, the 21-year-old Ramsay came across a Villa players' practice match and was asked to make up the numbers. They were amazed by his skills; they had never seen a display of close ball control before. When the game was over, the Villa players surrounded him and invited him to join the club, and very soon he became their captain. Ramsay later described the newly formed club's approach to the game as 'a dash at the man and a big kick at the ball'. Word spread about how fine a player Ramsay was, and spectators began turning up to watch the little man nicknamed 'Scotty'. He also took charge of training, which saw dramatic improvement that showed in the results, introducing what was known as the "passing game". This had become the main style of play in Scotland, whereas in England most teams relied on what was known as the "dribbling game".

Aston Villa Football Club played in scarlet and royal blue hooped shirts, white shorts and royal blue caps and stockings. The club rules stated "No member can take place in a match unless in the above uniform".

In February 1877 Roderick & Son held an auction. Lot 8:"- VILLA CROSS - The commodious and handsome RESIDENCE known as 'ASTON VILLA' situate fronting the Villa Road, nearly opposite George Street, and adjoining the Villa Cross Inn, in one of the most elevated, pleasant and healthy parts of the Lozells, with iron Palisades and Shrubbery in front, and with Yard Garden and Outbuildings in rear; let to Mr. Young as annual tenant, at the very low rent of £30. Also STABLING, with Yard, Gateway and Premises, fronting Heathfield Road, and let to Mr. Harper, Cab Proprietor, on repairing lease, which will expire in September next, at the very low rent of £24. This property has a frontage to each road of 12 yards, and contains 512 square yards. It is Leasehold for about sixty-five years, at a Ground-rent of £5 6s."

== Birmingham Senior Cup ==
18 November 1876	Tipton	1–0	Aston Villa	Horseley Road
Note: Tipton football club was established in 1872. Its colours, registered with the Birmingham Football Association, were Navy Blue. On 18 November 1876, Tipton beat the Aston Villa Football Club first-team 1-0 in the first round of the Birmingham Senior Cup. Tipton were knocked out by Saltley College in the next round.

== Friendlies ==
30 September 1876	Aston Villa	1–0	Wednesbury Town	Wellington Road
Note: On 30 September the first team faced Wednesbury Town while the Seconds played at the Wednesbury ground. The opposition changed its name between the quarter-final and semi-final in the Birmingham Cup from Wednesbury Town to Strollers. Villa fielded three Scotsmen, George Ramsay and brothers Jimmy Lindsay and Billy Lindsay.

28 October 1876	Aston Villa	–	Wednesbury Old Athletic	Wellington Road
Note: The 2nd teams played at Wednesbury.

28 October 1876	Westminster	–	Aston Villa	Aston Park

4 November 1876	Saltley College	–	Aston Villa	Saltley
Note: Aston Villa field three teams.

18 November 1876	Aston Villa	–	Harborne	Harborne

25 November 1876 Silver cup	Aston Villa	–	Allsopp & Sons	Hall Road, Handsworth
				Stadium: Olympic Ground

9 December 1876	Aston Villa	–	Westminster	Birchfield

9 December 1876	Aston Villa	–	Excelsior	Wellington Road

16 December 1876	West Bromwich	–	Aston Villa	West Bromwich

23 December 1876	Aston Villa	–	Calthorpe	Wellington Road

30 December 1876	Aston Villa	–	West Bromwich	Wellington Road

6 January 1877	Wednesbury Old Athletic	1–1	Aston Villa	The Oval
			G.B. Ramsay
Note:

13 January 1877	Aston Villa	v	Coventry Association	Wellington Road
Note: Coventry Association F.C. were the renamed Coventry Wanderers.

23 January 1877	Wednesbury Old Park	0–0	Aston Villa	Wednesbury
Note: Aston Villa were reportedly the better team with repeated shots on goal. Skilful play was hampered by the state of the wet pitch.

27 January 1877	Aston Villa	v	Harborne	Wellington Road
Note:

3 February 1877	Aston Villa	2–2	Aston Unity	Wellington Road
Note:

17 February 1877	Aston Villa	2–0	Saltley College	Wellington Road
Note: Unusually fine weather.

24 February 1877	Aston Villa	1–0	Walsall Swifts	Wellington Road
Note: Despite the victory, it was reported that none of the Villa players were up to their usual form while Swifts received praise.

3 March 1877	Wednesbury Town	–	Aston Villa	Wednesbury

17 March 1877	Aston Villa	3–0	St George's Athletic	Wellington Road
Note:

24 March 1877	Calthorpe	–	Aston Villa	Bristol Road

== Reserves ==
4 November 1876	Aston Villa	–	Royal	Wellington Road
Note: Aston Villa field three teams.

4 November 1876	St Thomas's	–	Aston Villa	Calthorpe Park
Note: Aston Villa field three teams.

25 November 1876	Aston Villa 2nd	–	St George's	Wellington Road

13 January 1877	Harold	0–0	Aston Villa 2nd	Aston Park
Note: The teams met for the first time. Notable performances included the Harrold goal-keeper making two excellent saves against a strong Villa forward line.

27 January 1877	Aston Villa	–	Victoria Swifts 2nd	Wellington Road
Note:

17 February 1877	Coventry Association	–	Aston Villa	Bull Field
Note: Coventry Association F.C. were the renamed Coventry Wanderers.

17 February 1877	Excelsior	–	Aston Villa 2nd	Aston Park

24 February 1877	Aston Villa 2nd	–	Harold	Wellington Road

3 March 1877	Aston Villa 2nd	–	Westminster	Wellington Road
Note: Friendlies were sometimes cancelled or re arranged at short notice.

3 March 1877	Aston Villa 2nd	–	Wednesbury Town 2nd	Wellington Road
Note: Friendlies were sometimes cancelled or re arranged at short notice.

15 March 1877	Aston Villa 2nd	0–4	Saltley College 2nd	Wellington Road
Note: Reported as one goal and three disputed goals to none. Originally team captains would consult each other in order to resolve any dispute on the pitch. Eventually this role was delegated to an umpire. Each team would bring their own partisan umpire allowing the team captains to concentrate on the game. In 1881, the referee, a third "neutral" official was added; this referee would be "referred to" if the umpires could not resolve a dispute. The referee did not take his place on the pitch until 1891, when the umpires became linesmen (now assistant referees). Eaves, Matthews, Stock and H.C. Twist played well for Villa.

24 March 1877	Aston Villa 2nd	–	Calthorpe 2nd	Wellington Road
