= Reuben Heaton =

Inventor (1839–1923)

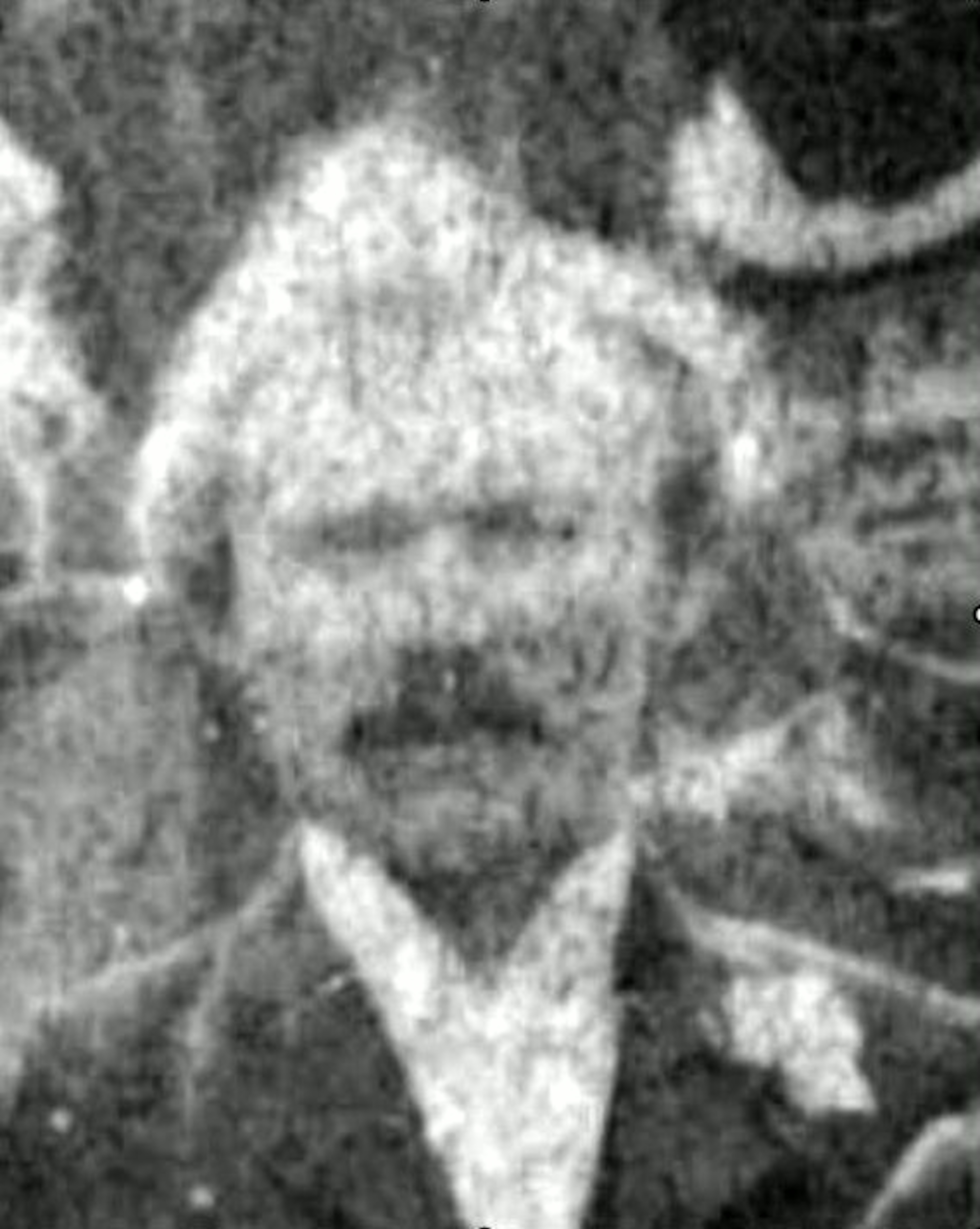
Reuben Heaton in 1888

Reuben George Heaton (Birmingham 1 August 1839 – Erdington 3 November 1923) was a manufacturer of fishing tackle and patentor of a blow football table-top game.

Heaton's father was John (Birmingham c.1811 – Birmingham 1883) was a brass caster and white metal candlestick maker of Aston, Birmingham. The Heaton's were "well known in Birmingham, with family members involved with the Birmingham Mint".

The firm of Reuben Heaton, founded in 1857 manufactured fishing tackle in large quantities for many of the well known brands of the time and also under its own brand. Unusual items also manufactured by the firm included, inkwells made from horses hooves, umbrella stands made from Elephants feet, bicycle wheels and paraffin lamps, all of which helped firm to overcome troubled times when tackle manufacture was slow. In 1887 he patented a railway key ferrule and, by 1893, had patented his "Football for the Table" which he advertised as an "amusing game" for hotels, coffee house and clubs.

His daughter, Rose, married the architect, Arthur Edwards.

== Aston Harold F.C. ==
In 1875 the Reuben Heaton Works football team, the Harold club or Aston Harold, were founder members of the Birmingham Football Association. A subscription of £3 was required from member clubs in order to commission a trophy for the member tournament, the trophy costing £50 and made by Mr R. Williams of Wednesbury. Not all of the clubs could afford the £3 subscription – the Harold club contributed 15s, Wednesbury Old Park 10s 6d, and Saltley College £1 12s. The bulk of the shortfall was met by the wealthy Calthorpe club, which contributed £7 7s, and Wednesbury Town and West Bromwich contributed £5 5s each.

The team competed in the first Birmingham Senior Cup tournament but were beaten by Wednesbury Old Park in the first found. Other notable performances included the Club's first meeting with Aston Villa (2nd}, a home 0-0 draw against at Aston Park. The Harold goal-keeper kept a clean sheet, making two excellent saves against a strong Villa forward line.

Harold were drawn against Hill Top Athletic in the first round of the 1878–79 Birmingham Senior Cup. The match was played at the latter's ground near Swan Village, West Bromwich. The Harold club outplayed Hill Top with neat passing compared to their opponents charging game. Harold won 2–0.
