= Shewmake =

Shewmake is a surname of French or German origin. Notable people with the surname include:

- Braden Shewmake (born 1997), American professional baseball shortstop
- John Troup Shewmake (1828-1898), American lawyer and politician
- Sharon Shewmake (born 1980), American politician

== See also ==
- Shoemake
