= Timeline of English football =

1840s – 1850s – 1860s – 1870s – 1880s – 1890s – 1900s – 1910s – 1920s – 1930s – 1940s – 1950s – 1960s – 1970s – 1980s – 1990s – 2000s – 2010s – 2020s

== 2020s ==
2026 - 2025 - 2024 - 2023 - 2022 - 2021 - 2020

=== 2026 ===
- Aston Villa win the 2025–26 UEFA Europa League final, beating SC Freiburg 3–0.
- Crystal Palace win the 2025–26 UEFA Conference League final, beating Rayo Vallecano 1–0.
- York City return to the Football League after 10 years, following a dramatic 1–1 draw on the final day; which saw them go 1–0 down in the 95th minute, and putting Rochdale in 1st place, before a 103rd minute equaliser handed York the league title.
- England reach the semi final of the 2026 FIFA World Cup, losing 2–1 to Argentina, and go on to beat France 6–4 in the 3rd place playoff match.
- Manchester City are found guilty of 114 out of 115 charges spanning between seasons 2009–10 and 2017–18.

=== 2025 ===
- Liverpool win the Premier League title in Arne Slot's first season in charge of the club.
- Crystal Palace win their first ever major trophy by beating Manchester City in the FA Cup final.
- Newcastle United beat Liverpool 2–1 in the EFL (Carabao) Cup final to break their long-standing trophy drought.
- Truro City become the first club from Cornwall to participate in a national football league after finishing top of a closely fought National League South.
- Luton Town suffer back to back relegations as they are beaten 5–3 away to West Bromwich Albion.
- Burnley are promoted back to the Premier League at the first time of asking, alongside Leeds United, with both clubs finishing on 100 points.

=== 2024 ===
- Liverpool win the EFL (Carabao) Cup against Chelsea in extra time, becoming the first club to win the competition 10 times.
- Manchester City claimed a historic 4th consecutive Premier League title, becoming the first English team to achieve this feat.
- Manchester City beat their rivals, Manchester United, in the FA Community Shield on penalties, winning the FA Community Shield for the first time in 6 years.
- Manchester United defeated their rivals, Manchester City, to earn their 13th FA Cup trophy, winning the game 2–1.
- All 3 promoted teams—Sheffield United, Burnley, and Luton Town—were relegated after just one season in the top flight, marking the first time this has occurred since the 1997-98 campaign.
- Ipswich Town were promoted to the Premier League, returning after 22 years outside the Premier League.
- The National League Cup is controversially revived, with multiple clubs refusing to participate.
- Former England, Manchester City and Leicester City manager, Sven-Göran Eriksson, passes away aged 76.

=== 2023 ===
- Erik ten Hag wins his first major trophy during his first season at Manchester United when the club beat Newcastle United 2–0 in the EFL (Carabao) Cup final.
- Manchester City win their 3rd league title in a row, becoming the 5th club to achieve this feat. They also complete the treble, winning the UEFA Champions League and the FA Cup, matching rivals, Manchester United's, achievement 24 years prior.
- Erling Haaland of Manchester City broke the Golden Boot record as he scored 36 goals, breaking Mohamed Salah's record of 32 goals for Liverpool in 2017/18. Seven years after winning the league and two years after winning the FA Cup, Leicester City were relegated after nine years in the top flight.
- Luton Town played their first ever Premier League season, despite playing non-league football in 2012–13.

=== 2022 ===
- Liverpool win the EFL Cup for a record ninth time, defeating Chelsea 11–10 on penalties.
- Roman Abramovich, owner of Chelsea, sells the team due to Russo-Ukrainian War.
- Liverpool win the FA Cup, defeating Chelsea 6–5 on penalties.
- Manchester City win their fifth league title after defeating Aston Villa 3–2.
- Bury's phoenix side, Bury AFC, merge with the original club after a buyer was found. Bury AFC are ruled to have been a continuation of the original club, and all trophies are transferred to the original club and Bury F.C. assume the phoenix club's position in the North West Counties Premier Division

=== 2021 ===
- Chelsea wins the UEFA Champions League, defeating Manchester City 1–0 in the final in Porto.
- Leicester City wins the FA Cup for the first time in their history, beating Chelsea 1–0.
- In a season played behind closed doors, Manchester City win the EFL Cup for the fourth consecutive season and eighth in total, and their fifth Premier League title, seventh in the top flight overall.
- Jack Grealish became the most expensive English footballer of all time after a transfer to Premier League champions Manchester City for £100 million.
- Cristiano Ronaldo rejoined Manchester United from Juventus for a fee of €15 million, plus a potential €8 million in add-ons.

=== 2020 ===
- All football action stopped on March 13, due to the COVID-19 pandemic lockdown. It resumed on June 17, behind closed doors.
- Liverpool win the Premier League for the first time, which marked their first national league title since 1990.
- Arsenal win the FA Cup for a record extending 14th time, beating Chelsea 2–1.
- Bury F.C. enter administration and were expelled from the Football League. A phoenix side is formed in the North West Counties Division One North.

== 2010s ==
2019 – 2018 – 2017 – 2016 – 2015 – 2014 – 2013 – 2012 – 2011 – 2010

=== 2019 ===
- Manchester City became the first team to win back-to-back Premier League titles since Manchester United in 2009.
- Liverpool win their 6th European Cup, claiming the UEFA Champions League in Madrid against Tottenham Hotspur.
- Manchester City became the first English team to win a domestic treble (FA Cup, League Cup, and Premier League).
- Tottenham Hotspur played their first game at the new Tottenham Hotspur Stadium, winning 2–0 over Crystal Palace. Son Heung-Min scored the first goal in the new stadium.

=== 2018 ===
- Manchester City win the Premier League title earning the nickname "The Centurions", the first club to win the top flight title with 100 points. During the season, they broke multiple all-time Premier League and Top Division records.
- In EFL League One, the two offshoot clubs of Wimbledon, phoenix club AFC Wimbledon and Milton Keynes Dons, end the 2017–18 season with different fates: AFC Wimbledon survived while MK Dons were relegated to League Two. This meant that the 2018–19 season would be the first in which AFC Wimbledon would play in a higher division than MK Dons.
- Chelsea win the FA Cup, beating Manchester United 1–0.
- Leicester City owner, Khun Vichai, alongside 4 others, is killed in a helicopter crash outside the King Power Stadium following Leicester's 1–1 draw with West Ham. Two policemen and two club staff members suffer burns and smoke inhalation in an unsuccessful attempt to rescue the occupants.

=== 2017 ===
- Arsène Wenger became the most successful manager in FA Cup history, winning his 7th FA Cup. Arsenal reclaimed the record for the most FA Cup titles with 13.
- Arsenal failed to qualify for the UEFA Champions League for the first time since 1997.
- Former Lincoln City, Watford, Aston Villa and England manager Graham Taylor died aged 72.
- Chelsea win their fifth Premier League title, and sixth English title, achieving a record of 30 wins in Antonio Conte's first season in English football.
- José Mourinho became the first Manchester United manager to win a major trophy in his first season, as he guided the club to a League Cup and Europa League double.
- Tottenham Hotspur played their final season at White Hart Lane after nearly 120 years at the stadium. Spurs beat Manchester United 2–1 on the final match there, with Harry Kane scoring the last goal for Tottenham at this ground and Wayne Rooney becoming the final goalscorer there. The club planned to use Wembley Stadium while their new stadium was being built within White Hart Lane's footprint.

=== 2016 ===
- The Football League was renamed to the English Football League, with all of the leagues and cup competitions it organizes including "EFL" in their titles.
- Manchester United equaled Arsenal's record of 12 FA Cups.
- Leicester City win the top tier title of English football for the first time in history, just 8 years after their relegation to the 3rd tier.
- Leicester City's Jamie Vardy became the first player to score in 11 consecutive appearances in Premier League history.
- Defending champions Chelsea sacked manager José Mourinho in December while in 16th place and eventually failed to qualify for European football, for the first time in two decades, finishing 10th - the lowest position for a Premier League holder. This record stood for only one year, as Leicester City finished 12th the following season. Eden Hazard, the previous season's PFA Players' Player of the Year, did not score a league goal until late April.
- Manchester United sacked manager Louis van Gaal despite winning the FA Cup, after a poor league season that saw the club miss out on next season's Champions League. Former Chelsea manager Jose Mourinho was appointed in his place.

=== 2015 ===
- Arsenal win the FA Cup for a record 12th time.
- Chelsea win the Premier League in Jose Mourinho's return to the club.
- AFC Bournemouth were promoted to the top flight for the first time after winning the Championship, just eight years after the club went into administration and almost dropped out of the EFL.

=== 2014 ===
- May 19: Louis van Gaal was confirmed as the manager of Manchester United. Former interim manager Ryan Giggs was named as his assistant, and confirmed his retirement as a professional football player at the age of 40.
- Arsenal win the FA Cup, their first major trophy in 9 years.
- Manchester City win their 4th top flight title.

=== 2013 ===
- Sir Alex Ferguson retired after winning Manchester United's 20th league title.
- Wigan Athletic win the FA Cup for the first time, but were relegated from the Premier League, becoming the first FA Cup winners to be relegated the same season as their Cup win.
- Swansea City win the Football League Cup for the first time and became the first Welsh club to represent the English football league system in European tournaments.
- Gareth Bale signed for Real Madrid for an £85.3 million transfer fee.

=== 2012 ===
- Liverpool win the League Cup on penalties in the return of former manager Kenny Dalglish.
- Manchester City win the Premier League title ahead of rivals Manchester United on goal difference, their 3rd overall English league win, and became the first team relegated from the Premier League to win the title. This was also their first English league title success since 1968.
- Chelsea win the UEFA Champions League for the first time in their history, defeating FC Bayern Munich in the Allianz Arena on penalties. They also won the FA Cup.

=== 2011 ===
- Manchester United win a record-setting 19th top-flight title. They also reached the Champions League final at Wembley Stadium, but lost to FC Barcelona for the second time in three years.
- Manchester City win the 130th FA Cup Final beating Stoke City 1–0 at Wembley, their first major trophy after 36 years.
- Birmingham City claimed the second major trophy in their history after defeating Arsenal in the League Cup Final. Despite that, however, they were relegated on the final day of the league season.
- On Saturday, February 5, there were 41 goals in 8 Premier League games which is the record for a single day in the Premier League since it became a 20-team division. The results were Aston Villa 2–2 Fulham, Everton 5–3 Blackpool, Manchester City 3–0 West Bromwich, Newcastle 4–4 Arsenal, Stoke 3–2 Sunderland, Tottenham 2–1 Bolton, Wigan 4–3 Blackburn, Wolves 2–1 Manchester United.
- Chelsea signed Fernando Torres from Liverpool for a British record £50 million.
- Chelsea Manager Carlo Ancelotti was sacked despite winning the League and Cup double for the club the previous season.

=== 2010 ===
- Manchester United defended their League Cup title.
- Liverpool failed to qualify for the UEFA Champions League for the first time since 2003. Tottenham Hotspur broke into the top four of the Premier League for the first time, thus taking Liverpool's spot in Europe's top club competition.
- Chelsea became the seventh team to win the league and FA Cup double, scoring a record 108 Premier League goals in the process.
- Chester City, the Football Conference team relegated from The Football League last year, went out of business after 125 years in existence. They were reformed as Chester F.C. and initially competed in a regional division.

== 2000s ==
2009 – 2008 – 2007 – 2006 – 2005 – 2004 – 2003 – 2002 – 2001 – 2000

=== 2009 ===
- Manchester United became the first team to win three consecutive top division titles on more than one occasion, which equaled Liverpool's long-standing record of 18 league titles. They also win the third Football League Cup of their history but lose 2–0 to FC Barcelona in the UEFA Champions League final.
- Cardiff City left Ninian Park after 100 years and relocated to the new 27,000-seat, Cardiff City stadium nearby.
- Cristiano Ronaldo, a Portuguese forward, became the most expensive footballer in the world when Manchester United sold him to Real Madrid for £80 million.
- Sir Bobby Robson, who guided Ipswich Town to FA Cup glory in 1978 and UEFA Cup glory in 1981, as well as guiding the England team to the semi-finals of the 1990 World Cup, died of cancer aged 76.
- After being deducted a record 30 points for financial irregularities before the start of the season, Luton Town were relegated to the Conference, becoming the first club to fall to that level after three successive relegations.

=== 2008 ===
- Portsmouth defeated Cardiff City 1–0 in the FA Cup final, winning the competition for the first time in 49 years, the longest gap between two FA Cup wins for the same club.
- In early September, both Kevin Keegan and Alan Curbishley resigned from their Premier League management jobs at Newcastle and West Ham, respectively, citing boardroom interference in transfers. In the same week, Dimitar Berbatov completed a move to Manchester United against the wishes of the Tottenham Hotspur board. Manchester City were purchased by the Abu Dhabi United Group and on the same day broke the transfer record by purchasing Robinho of Brazil for £32million – slightly exceeding the £30.75million that their city rivals paid for Berbatov.
- Three clubs started the Football League Two season with points deductions. Both Rotherham United and AFC Bournemouth began the season on -17 points after exiting administration without using a Company Voluntary Agreement. Luton Town started on -30 points after a 20-point deduction due to exiting administration without using a CVA and a 10-point deduction due to illegal agent payments during transfers. This 30-point deduction doubled the previous record for points deduction imposed on a club set in 2007.
- Manchester United win the Premier League for the 10th time and overall 17th English League championship. It is also the tenth title for manager Sir Alex Ferguson (now the longest serving manager in English football with 22 years of unbroken service at the club) and Ryan Giggs, the only player to have collected title medals with all 10 of their championship-winning sides since 1993.
- Tottenham Hotspur defeated Chelsea 2–1 after extra time in the first final of the Football League Cup to be held at the new Wembley Stadium.
- Fabio Capello succeeded Steve McClaren as head coach of the England national football team.
- The 2008 UEFA Champions League final was the first all-English club final in European Cup history, and after 120 minutes, Manchester United defeated Chelsea on penalties after a 1–1 draw in Moscow, Russia.
- Leicester City were relegated to the third tier of English football for the first time in their 124-year history.
- Aldershot Town win promotion to the Football League as Conference National champions, 16 years after the previous incarnation went out of business.
- Hull City A.F.C. reached the top flight for the first time in their history defeating Bristol City F.C. 1–0 at Wembley Stadium in the play-off final.

=== 2007 ===
- Luton Town F.C. entered administration on November 22, thus incurring a 10-point deduction for the 2007–08 season.
- Steve McClaren was fired from his position as England manager after failing to qualify for the 2008 Euros – the first time in 24 years that England have failed to qualify for the European Championships.
- Manchester United win the Premiership for the ninth time under Sir Alex Ferguson.
- Chelsea win a cup double, claiming the FA Cup in the first final back at the recently completed Wembley Stadium. The match finished 1–0 with Didier Drogba scoring the only goal in the last minute of extra-time. Ryan Giggs set a new record for the most appearances in FA cup finals. However, he could not beat Mark Hughes' record for the most finals won by one player. The victory by Chelsea stopped Manchester United from winning the Double.
- Leeds United entered administration on May 4 after a number of years struggling with the debt incurred by previous boards, thus incurring a 10-point deduction for the 2006–07 season, resulting in them being relegated to the third tier for the first time, but this was not the last of them. Two months later, on August 4, the club was sold without a C.V.A., as required by league rules. As a consequence, Leeds were hit with the biggest point deduction yet in English professional football history (until Luton's 30 point penalty a year later), starting the 2007–08 League One season on -15.
- Boston United entered administration in the final minutes of the league season to take a 10-point deduction in the 2006–07 season. They were relegated two divisions to the Conference North.
- Chelsea became League Cup champions after defeating Arsenal 2–1 at the Millennium Stadium in Wales. This was also the last major English Cup Final to be played at the Millennium Stadium before the move back to Wembley Stadium after its completion.
- The Arsenal women became the first and only English club to win the competition now known as the UEFA Women's Champions League, winning the UEFA Women's Cup Final against Swedish side Umeå 1–0 on aggregate.
- American tycoons George N. Gillett Jr. and Tom Hicks pay £174.1m to take over Liverpool.
- Alan Ball Jr., a member of England's World Cup winning team of 1966, died of a heart attack aged 61.

=== 2006 ===
- Randy Lerner increased his shareholdings of Aston Villa to 90%.
- John Terry succeeded David Beckham as England's national team captain. Liverpool's Steven Gerrard is named vice-captain.
- Sven-Göran Eriksson announced that he would step down from the position of manager of the English team after the 2006 World Cup. He will be succeeded by Steve McClaren with effect from 1 August.
- Chelsea wins the Premier League for the second year in succession.
- Manchester United win the League Cup for the second time in their history defeating Wigan Athletic 4–0 at the Millennium Stadium.
- Middlesbrough reached the UEFA Cup final for the first time in their history, only to be beaten 4–0 by Sevilla.
- Peter Osgood, who had won FA Cups with Chelsea and Southampton in the 1970s, died of a heart attack aged 59.
- Charlton Athletic became the first Premiership club to change their shirt design mid-season due to the collapse of former sponsors Allsports.
- Alan Shearer retired two weeks early following a knee injury. After a professional career that lasted almost 20 years, the former England and Newcastle captain bowed out as the Premiership's leading goal scorer of all time with 260 goals in 441 games but only one trophy, the 1994–95 Premiership title with Blackburn.
- Sunderland were relegated from the Premiership, and broke the record that had been set by Stoke City 21 years earlier for the lowest points accumulated, ending the season with just 15 points. They also matched Stoke's record low of just three wins.
- Reading were promoted to the top flight for the first time in their history, after winning the Football League championship with a professional league record of 106 points.
- Liverpool defeated West Ham 3–1 on penalties in the 125th FA Cup final after the game finished 3–3 in normal time. It was the last FA Cup game at the Millennium Stadium before Wembley re-opens.
- Arsenal's first UEFA Champions League final saw Jens Lehmann become the first player who was dismissed in a final. FC Barcelona won 2–1. The club also played their last season at Highbury after 93 years, with Thierry Henry scoring the last goal, and the last hat trick, in the final game before relocating to the new 60,000-seat Emirates Stadium at nearby Ashburton Grove.
- The players of Aston Villa issued a joint statement, critical of chairman Doug Ellis. It was the first time such a statement had been formally issued to the press by a collective of players of an English football club.
- In their first season as a top division club and only their 28th in the professional leagues, Wigan Athletic finished tenth (having spent much of the season in the top five) and were League Cup runners-up to Manchester United who had defeated them 4–0 in the final.
- Oxford United, the 1986 League Cup winners and members of the First Division from 1985 to 1988, became the first former winners of a major trophy to be relegated to the Conference.

=== 2005 ===
- Liverpool defeated CSKA Moscow 3–2 in extra time, winning the European Super Cup for the third time, setting new record for English clubs.
- Liverpool win the Champions League for the fifth time, an English record, on penalties, after drawing 3–3 with A.C. Milan in Istanbul.
- Chelsea win the Premier League title setting a new Premier League record for fewest goals conceded (15) and most points attained (95).
- Arsenal became the first team to win the FA Cup on penalties, defeating Manchester United in the shootout after a goalless draw.
- George Best, widely regarded as one of the greatest footballers in the history of Manchester United and the footballing world, died from a kidney infection aged 59.
- Wigan Athletic reached the top division for the first time in their history after finishing runners-up in the Football League championship, mirroring Fulham's achievement four years before, having made their way from League Two to the Premier League.
- Coventry City move into the new 32,500-seat Ricoh Arena after 106 years at the Highfield Road stadium.
- The Glazer takeover of Manchester United lead to disgruntled fans creating F.C. United of Manchester.
- Swansea City left the Vetch Field after 93 years and relocated to a new 22,000-seat stadium in the city. They bowed out at the Vetch on a high note with promotion from League Two.
- Former England internationals Jamie Redknapp and Graeme Le Saux retired from playing, their careers going out on a low note as their club Southampton dropped out of the top flight after 27 years.
- Barnet were promoted back to the Football League after four years away, along with Carlisle United returning after just one season.

=== 2004 ===
- Arsenal were crowned Premiership champions after going a 38-game league season unbeaten, earning the nickname The Invincibles.
- Manchester United win the FA Cup for a record eleventh time.
- Divisions One, Two and Three of The Football League were renamed the Football League championship, League One and League Two respectively as part of a rebranding exercise.
- Everton striker Wayne Rooney, still only 18, became the world's most expensive teenager when he signed for Manchester United in a transfer deal which could eventually rise to £25 million from an initial £20 million.
- Middlesbrough defeated Bolton Wanderers 2–1 in the League Cup final to win the first major trophy in their 128-year history.
- Carlisle United, who had spent one season in the First Division during the 1970s, became the first former members of the top flight to be relegated to the Conference after 76 years of league membership. They went down with York City, who have played in the Football League for 75 years and eliminated several clubs (notably Arsenal, Manchester United and Everton) from the top flight in cup competitions.
- Brian Clough, the legendary manager who had guided Derby County to a First Division title and Nottingham Forest to league and European glory, died of stomach cancer aged 69.
- Bill Nicholson, the legendary former Tottenham Hotspur manager, died aged 85.
- Wimbledon became Milton Keynes Dons to reflect their new location.

=== 2003 ===
- Liverpool win the League Cup for a record seventh time.
- Arsenal win the FA Cup Final by beating Southampton 1–0
- Chelsea were bought by Russian billionaire Roman Abramovich in an English record takeover deal worth £150 million.
- Manchester United overhauled Arsenal during the final weeks of the season to claim their eighth Premiership title in eleven seasons.
- Sunderland confirmed themselves as statistically the worst team in the Premiership era after they were relegated with a record low of 4 wins, 19 points and 21 goals.
- Leicester City win promotion to the Premiership as Division One runners-up despite having started the season in receivership with £30 million debts and a transfer embargo.
- Manchester City left Maine Road after 80 years and moved into the 48,000-seat City of Manchester Stadium which had been constructed for the previous year's Commonwealth Games.
- Darlington, the Division Three club, left the Feethams after 120 years and relocated to a new 25,000-seat stadium in the south of the town.
- Marc-Vivien Foé, the Manchester City midfielder, collapsed and died while playing in the semi-final of the Confederations Cup for Cameroon in France. Foé, 28, also had played for West Ham United earlier in his career.
- Wimbledon relocate to Milton Keynes and set up a temporary home in the National Hockey Stadium while a new permanent stadium was being built.

=== 2002 ===
- Arsenal joined Manchester United as the second club to win three league championship/FA Cup doubles.
- West Bromwich Albion and Birmingham City win promotion to the Premiership, ending an exile from the top flight which both clubs had begun in 1986.
- Mobile phone operator MM02 replaced SEGA as Arsenal's shirt sponsor.
- Leicester City left Filbert Street after 111 years and relocated to the 32,000-seat Walkers Stadium.
- Manchester United broke the British transfer record once again by paying Leeds United £29million for central defender Rio Ferdinand.
- On March 16, a First Division match between Sheffield United and West Bromwich Albion degenerated into one of the most violent in English football history, featuring multiple on-field assaults and ending with abandonment when United, trailing 3–0 at the time, were left with 6 players. This match entered English football lore as the Battle of Bramall Lane.
- Alan Shearer hit his 200th Premiership goal against Chalton Athletic at St. James' Park on April 20, 2002.
- Everton became the first team to have spent 100 seasons in the top flight of English football.
- The FA approved the plan of Wimbledon to move to Milton Keynes. The move was extremely unpopular with the club's fans, who formed a breakaway club called AFC Wimbledon. The new club was playing at a much lower level (Combined Counties League) than the original one, who were competing in Division One, but the new Wimbledon club was soon enjoying a higher attendance.
- Brighton & Hove Albion became only the seventh club in English football history to win back-to-back promotion championships after winning the 2001–02 League One title (having won the 2000–01 League Two title the season before).

=== 2001 ===
- Manchester United became the fourth English club to win three successive league championships, following Huddersfield Town in the 1920s, Arsenal in the 1930s, and Liverpool in the 1980s.
- Liverpool completed treble of the FA Cup, League Cup and UEFA Cup.
- David Rocastle, who had won a League Cup and two league championships with Arsenal as well as never being on the losing side in his 14 England appearances, died of cancer aged 33.
- Paul Vaessen, who had famously scored the winning goal for Arsenal against Juventus at the Stadio Comunale in the second leg of a Cup Winners' Cup semi-final on 23 April 1980 (the first time an English club had beaten Juventus in Turin), died of a drug overdose at the age of 39. He was leading a troubled life since injury had resulted in his premature retirement from football in 1983 aged just 21. He was known as "a forgotten hero" as his death gained no media coverage at all, announcements of Paul's death in his local free newspaper omitted the fact that he had formerly been a footballer and merely labeled him a "local addict".
- Coventry City suffered relegation from the Premiership after 34 successive seasons of top-flight football.
- Fulham were promoted to the Premiership, becoming the first club since the Premier League's formation to make their way from Division Three (now League Two) to the top flight.
- Stan Cullis, legendary former player and manager of Wolverhampton Wanderers, died aged 85.
- Bertie Mee, manager of Arsenal's 1971 double-winning team, died aged 82.
- Les Sealey, who had kept goal for Manchester United in their FA Cup triumph of 1990 and the European Cup Winners' Cup triumph of 1991, died of a heart attack aged 43.
- Oxford United left the Manor Ground after 76 years and relocated to the new 12,500-seat Kassam Stadium (named after chairman Firoz Kassam) at Blackbird Leys, while Southampton ended 103 years at The Dell and moved into their new 32,000-seat St Mary's Stadium – which holds more than twice as many spectators compared to their old ground.
- Manchester United broke the national transfer fee record twice – first by paying PSV Eindhoven £19million for Dutch striker Ruud van Nistelrooy, and then by paying Lazio of Italy £28.1million for Argentinian midfielder Juan Sebastián Verón.

=== 2000 ===
- FA Cup holders Manchester United declined to defend their trophy, instead choosing to take part in the inaugural FIFA Club World Championship—Darlington became the lucky losers who took their place in the third-round draw.
- England lost 1–0 to Germany in their opening qualifier for the 2002 World Cup, in a game that was also the last game at Wembley Stadium before it closes its doors after 77 years for a complete revamp. The goal was scored by Dietmar Hamann.
- Kevin Keegan resigned after England's defeat and was succeeded by Lazio's Swedish coach Sven-Göran Eriksson – the first foreigner to take charge of the England team.
- Chelsea defeated Aston Villa 1–0 to win the last FA Cup final at Wembley before its reconstruction.
- Sir Stanley Matthews, legendary former England, Blackpool and Stoke City winger, died after a short illness at the age of 85.
- The new home of Welsh football is the 72,000-seat Millennium Stadium, which stands on the site of Cardiff Arms Park, and will host all English cup finals and playoff finals until Wembley is reopened.
- After guiding Leicester City to their second Football League Cup victory in two seasons, manager Martin O'Neill moved north of the border to manage Celtic in the Scottish Premier League.
- Alan Knight, 39-year-old goalkeeper, retired after playing 801 games for Portsmouth since 1978.
- Wimbledon were relegated from the Premier League after 14 years in the top flight.

== 1990s ==
1999 – 1998 – 1997 – 1996 – 1995 – 1994 – 1993 – 1992 – 1991 – 1990

=== 1999 ===
- Manchester United completed a unique treble of the Premier League title, FA Cup and European Cup, and manager Alex Ferguson was honored with a knighthood.
- On-loan goalkeeper Jimmy Glass scored an injury-time winner for Carlisle United on the last day of the season to preserve their league status and relegate Scarborough.
- Bradford City finished runners-up in Division One, ending their 77-year absence from the top flight of English football.
- Glenn Hoddle was sacked as England manager after a controversial newspaper interview. He was replaced by Kevin Keegan.
- Sir Alf Ramsey, manager of the 1966 England World Cup winning team, died from Alzheimer's disease at the age of 79.
- On Boxing Day, Chelsea became the first British side to field an entirely foreign (non-UK) line-up in a Premier League match against Southampton.
- Division One champions Sunderland set a then English professional league record of 105 points.
- Blackburn Rovers were relegated from the Premier League just four years after being champions.
- Cheltenham Town were promoted to the Football League as Conference champions.
- Wigan Athletic, who had played at Springfield Park since their formation in 1932, relocated to the new 25,000-seat JJB Stadium.

=== 1998 ===
- Arsenal equaled Manchester United's record of two league championship and FA Cup doubles in their first full season under the management of Frenchman Arsène Wenger, who was also the first foreign manager to win the English top flight.
- Chelsea completed a double of the Cup Winners' Cup and League Cup within four months of Gianluca Vialli taking charge of team affairs following Ruud Gullit's dismissal, which followed a dispute with chairman Ken Bates over transfer funds.
- Doncaster Rovers F.C. were relegated from the Football League with a record of 34 league defeats.
- Manchester City were relegated to the third tier of the English league for the first time in their history.
- Halifax Town win the Conference title and were promoted back to the Football League after five years away.
- Reading left Elm Park after 102 years and relocated to the 25,000-seat Madejski Stadium named after chairman John Madejski.
- England went out of the World Cup in the round of 16 in France after losing on penalties to Argentina following a 2–2 draw.
- Charlton Athletic win promotion to the Premier League by defeating Sunderland 7–6 on penalties after a 4–4 draw in the Division One playoff final at Wembley.

=== 1997 ===
- After captaining Manchester United to their fourth Premiership title in five seasons and 11th English League championship overall, Eric Cantona announced his retirement as a player at the age of 30.
- Ruud Gullit became the first foreign manager to win an English trophy after his Chelsea side defeated Middlesbrough 2–0 in the FA Cup final to end their 26-year trophy drought.
- Middlesbrough experienced a unique season. They lost in both domestic cup finals and had a 3-point deduction imposed for postponing a Premiership fixture at short notice seeing them relegated in second from bottom place – so they finished in the last two of all three major English competitions.
- Alan Shearer was ruled out of football for seven months after suffering a broken ankle in a pre-season game.
- Kevin Keegan shocked Newcastle United by resigning as manager just after the turn of the New Year. He felt that he could take the club no further. He was succeeded by Kenny Dalglish.
- Bolton Wanderers moved into the Reebok Stadium, leaving Burnden Park, their home for 102 years.
- Sunderland ended 99 years at Roker Park and move to the 42,000-seat Stadium of Light on the banks of the River Wear.
- Derby County relocated to the 33,500-seat Pride Park Stadium after 101 years at the Baseball Ground.
- After a record 119 years at the Victoria Ground, Stoke City relocated to the 28,000-seat Britannia Stadium.
- Brighton & Hove Albion, FA Cup runners-up 14 years ago, avoided relegation to the Conference by drawing 1–1 away with Hereford United, who went down instead, on the last day of the Division Three season.
- Billy Bremner, legendary Leeds United captain of the 1960s and 1970s, died of a heart attack aged 54.

=== 1996 ===
- Manchester United win second league championship and FA Cup double. Following taunts that "You win nothing with kids", the young team responded by achieving something that no English team has done before.
- Alan Shearer became the world's first £15-million player when he left Blackburn Rovers to join his hometown club Newcastle United.
- England hosted the European Championships for the first time and reached the semi-finals, losing 6–5 on penalties after a 1–1 draw.
- Terry Venables stepped down after two-and-a-half years as England manager after the European Championships and was replaced by Glenn Hoddle.
- Bob Paisley, who had won a record 21 trophies in nine seasons as Liverpool manager, died, aged 77, after a long illness.
- Aston Villa won the League Cup for a record-equaling fifth time, defeating Leeds United 3–0.
- Goalkeeper Peter Shilton played his 1000th career league game for Leyton Orient against Brighton & Hove Albion.
- Bristol Rovers ended a decade of ground-sharing with non-league Bath City and moved back to Bristol to play at the Memorial Ground, home of the local rugby team.

=== 1995 ===
- Manchester United's French striker Eric Cantona was banned from football for eight months and sentenced to 120 hours community service for kicking a Crystal Palace spectator at Selhurst Park. Chelsea captain Dennis Wise was convicted of assaulting a taxi driver. Arsenal's Paul Merson and Crystal Palace's Chris Armstrong both underwent rehab after it was revealed that Merson struggled from cocaine addiction and alcoholism, while Armstrong had failed a drugs test. Arsenal's manager George Graham was sacked following revelations that he had accepted £425,000 in illegal payments in 1992 in connection with the acquisition of Pal Lydersen and John Jensen.
- Kenny Dalglish became the third manager to win the English league with different clubs after Blackburn Rovers clinched the Premiership title to top the English league for the first time since 1914.
- A Paul Rideout goal gave Everton a 1–0 victory over Manchester United in the FA Cup final to leave Alex Ferguson's men without a major trophy for the first time since 1989.
- Bobby Stokes, who scored Southampton's winning goal in their shock win over Manchester United in the 1976 FA Cup final, died suddenly at the age of 44.
- Manchester United broke the English record in January by paying Newcastle United £7 million for striker Andy Cole. Five months later the record was broken again when Arsenal paid Internazionale £7.5million for Dutch striker Dennis Bergkamp. Bergkamp's record is almost instantly broken when Liverpool signed Nottingham Forest striker Stan Collymore for £8.5million.
- Middlesbrough left their Ayresome Park home for the Riverside Stadium, the first stadium designed and constructed to comply with the Taylor Report.
- West Ham United celebrated their centenary.
- Middlesbrough, Division One champions, moved from Ayresome Park after 92 years and move to the new 30,000-seat Riverside Stadium on the banks of the River Tees. They returned to the Premier League as the first top division club to move into a new stadium since Manchester City relocated to Maine Road in 1923.

=== 1994 ===
- Manchester United became only the fourth club in the 20th century to win the league championship and FA Cup double. They achieved this triumph just four months after the death of former manager Sir Matt Busby at the age of 84. They were denied an unprecedented 'treble' by Aston Villa, who defeated them in the final of the League Cup.
- Blackburn Rovers broke the English transfer fee record by paying Norwich City £5 million for 21-year-old striker Chris Sutton.
- Club and former England captain Bryan Robson left Manchester United after 13 years to become player-manager of Middlesbrough.
- Tottenham Hotspur were found guilty of financial irregularities dating back to the 1980s and handed the most severe punishment in the history of English football: a £600,000 fine, 12 league points deducted and a one-year ban from the FA Cup. The points deduction and the FA Cup ban were later quashed but the fine was increased to a new record of £1.5million.
- Billy Wright, former captain of Wolverhampton Wanderers and England, died of cancer aged 70.
- Huddersfield Town ended 86 years at Leeds Road and moved into their new 20,000-seat Alfred McAlpine Stadium.
- Northampton Town relocated to Sixfields Stadium after 97 years at the County Ground.
- Liverpool's famous Spion Kop was demolished to make way for a new all-seater stand, as was Aston Villa's Holte End, as standing accommodation was banned from Premier League stadiums.

=== 1993 ===
- Manchester United win the inaugural Premiership title to end their 26-year wait for the league championship. They strengthened themselves for the defense of their big prize by paying a British record fee of £3.75million for Nottingham Forest's young Irish midfielder Roy Keane.
- Arsenal became the first club to win the FA Cup and League Cup in the same season, after defeating Sheffield Wednesday 2–1 in both finals.
- Tony Barton, who had managed Aston Villa to European Cup glory in 1982, died of a heart attack aged 56.
- Graham Taylor resigned as England manager after the nation's failure to qualify for the 1994 FIFA World Cup and was succeeded by Terry Venables.
- Bobby Moore, captain of England's 1966 World Cup winning team, dies at the age of 51.
- Millwall left The Den after 83 years and relocated to the 20,000-seat stadium The New Den.
- Wycombe Wanderers, managed by the former Nottingham Forest player Martin O'Neill, win the GM Vauxhall Conference title and took the place of Halifax Town in Division Three.
- Brian Clough retired as manager of Nottingham Forest after 18 years in charge, and went out on a low note as Forest were relegated from the Premier League.
- Norwich City finished third in the Premier League and qualified for the UEFA Cup, where they famously eliminated FC Bayern Munich in the second round before being beaten by Inter Milan in the next round.
- Newcastle United were promoted back to the top flight after a four-year exile.

=== 1992 ===
- The Football Association created the FA Premier League, an elite league of 22 clubs that replaced the old Football League First Division as England's highest division.
- Manchester United win the Football League Cup for the first time in their history, defeating four-time winners Nottingham Forest in the final.
- Blackburn Rovers, back in the top flight for the first time since the 1960s, made Alan Shearer England's most expensive footballer by paying Southampton £3.5million for his services.
- Leeds United win the last Football League First Division championship before the creation of the FA Premier League.
- Liverpool win the FA Cup for the fifth time in their centenary year.
- Aldershot, who had been struggling to stay afloat for two years, finally went out of business on 25 March. Maidstone United followed suit on 17 August after their financial crisis left them with no option but to quit the Football League.
- Eight years after retiring as a player, Kevin Keegan returned to football as manager of Newcastle United and saved them from Second Division relegation.
- Chester City moved into their new Deva Stadium, having ground-shared with Macclesfield Town for two years since leaving Sealand Road.
- Gary Lineker retired from international football with 48 goals to his name for England – just one goal short of the record set by Bobby Charlton. He also called time on his career in England, joining Nagoya Grampus of Japan.
- England were eliminated from Euro 92 in the group stages after losing their final group game 2–1 to host nation Sweden.
- After a slow start to the new Premier League campaign which put their league title hopes under serious doubt, Manchester United paid Leeds United £1.2million for French striker Eric Cantona in hope of winning a title race which by late November was led by the likes of Aston Villa and Norwich City.
- Paul Gascoigne joined Lazio of Italy in a £5.5million move from Tottenham Hotspur.

=== 1991 ===
- Arsenal win the Football League title with just one defeat from 38 fixtures.
- Manchester United marked the comeback of English clubs in European competition by defeating FC Barcelona 2–1 in the Cup Winners' Cup final.
- Liverpool were readmitted to European competition and, as First Division runners-up entered the UEFA Cup for the 1991–92 season.
- After three years with French side AS Monaco, Glenn Hoddle returned to England to become player-manager of Swindon Town.
- Dean Saunders became the most expensive player in English footballer when he was transferred from Derby County to Liverpool in a £2.9million deal.
- Tottenham Hotspur win the FA Cup for a record eighth time, defeating Nottingham Forest 2–1 in the final, but midfielder Paul Gascoigne was ruled out for a year with a knee injury suffered early in the game.
- Aston Villa and England midfielder David Platt joined Italian side Bari for £6.5million.
- Barnet were promoted to the Football League as Conference champions.
- Kenny Dalglish resigned as Liverpool manager on 22 February, and returned to football as manager of Second Division side Blackburn Rovers on 12 October following the club's takeover by wealthy local entrepreneur Jack Walker.

=== 1990 ===
- Liverpool win their eighteenth top-flight title.
- England reached the semi-finals of the World Cup before losing to eventual winners Germany on penalties after a 1–1 draw. Manager Bobby Robson resigned after the competition to take charge of Dutch side PSV Eindhoven and was succeeded by Aston Villa manager Graham Taylor, who in turn was replaced by Czech coach Jozef Venglos – the first manager in the top flight of English football from outside of the British Isles.
- English clubs were readmitted to European competition after a five-year ban arising from the Heysel Stadium disaster. First Division runners-up, Aston Villa, qualified for the UEFA Cup whilst FA Cup winners, Manchester United, qualified for the Cup Winners' Cup. Champions Liverpool were unable to compete in the European Cup because they had to serve an extra year of the ban.
- Leeds United win the Second Division championship to end their eight-year exile from the First Division.
- York City striker David Longhurst collapsed and died in his side's Fourth Division home fixture against Lincoln City at Bootham Crescent.
- AFC Bournemouth director Brian Tiler, a former Aston Villa player, was killed in a car crash. Manager Harry Redknapp was also involved in the crash but survived.
- Play-off finals became one-legged matches played at Wembley. In the Second Division, Swindon Town defeated Sunderland 1–0 but stayed in the Second Division after being found guilty of financial irregularities, with Sunderland being promoted in their place.
- Manchester United win their first major trophy under the management of Alex Ferguson, defeating Crystal Palace 1–0 in the FA Cup final replay after drawing the first match 3–3.
- Peter Shilton retired from international football at the age of 40, having kept goal a record 125 caps for the country.
- Manchester United and Arsenal were, respectively, deducted one and two points, for a 21-man brawl involving their players on the pitch – the first and, so far, the only instance in English league history where a team was docked points for player misconduct.

== 1980s ==
1989 – 1988 – 1987 – 1986 – 1985 – 1984 – 1983 – 1982 – 1981 – 1980

=== 1989 ===
- Arsenal win the league championship for the first time in 18 years, with Michael Thomas scoring in the final minute of the final game of the season, securing a 2–0 away win over nearest rivals Liverpool to claim the title on goals scored, with both teams goal difference being equal.
- 94 Liverpool fans died on April 15 after being crushed on the terraces at Hillsborough Stadium, where Liverpool were playing Nottingham Forest in the FA Cup semi-final. The final number of people who lost their lives due to the disaster rose to 97.
- Liverpool went on to win the FA Cup with a 3–2 extra-time victory over Everton at Wembley. Ian Rush, who scored twice in the 1986 all-Merseyside final triumph, does so again.
- John Lyall's 15-year reign as West Ham manager came to an end after they were relegated from the First Division.
- Newport County went out of business on 27 February and were then expelled from the Football Conference for failing to fulfill their fixtures.
- Leeds United's most successful ever manager, Don Revie, died on 26 May from motor neurone disease, aged only 61.
- Peter Shilton became the most capped England international when he won his 109th cap, beating Bobby Moore's record.
- Nottingham Forest ended their nine-year wait for a major trophy by winning the Football League Cup.
- Alex Ferguson made a series of big-money signings for Manchester United in his latest attempt to win them their first league title since 1967, paying a total of more than £7 million for Mike Phelan, Neil Webb, Paul Ince, Gary Pallister and Danny Wallace.
- Gary Lineker returned to English football after three years in Spain with FC Barcelona, joining Tottenham Hotspur for £1.1 million.

=== 1988 ===
- Liverpool wrapped up their seventeenth league title after losing just two league games in a 40-game season.
- Wimbledon defeated Liverpool 1–0 to win the FA Cup in one of the most dramatic finals seen at Wembley. The triumph came at the end of Wimbledon's 11th season as a Football League club and only their second as First Division members.
- Luton Town win the first major trophy in their history by defeating Arsenal 3–2 in the League Cup final.
- Jackie Milburn, former Newcastle United striker, died of cancer at the age of 64.
- Lincoln City, the first club to suffer automatic relegation from the Football League, regained their league status at the first attempt by clinching the Football Conference title.
- Paul Gascoigne, 21-year-old Newcastle United midfielder, became England's first £2-million footballer when he signed for Tottenham Hotspur.
- Shortly after Gascoigne's transfer, the national transfer fee record was broken again when Everton paid £2.2 million for West Ham United striker Tony Cottee.
- Ian Rush returned to Liverpool after an unsuccessful season at Juventus in Italy for £2.8 million—the third time in the space of a few weeks that the record fee paid by an English club was broken.
- Billy Bonds, the oldest outfield player in the Football League at 41, retired from playing with West Ham United.
- Mark Hughes returned to Manchester United after two years away for a fee of £1.8 million.
- Portsmouth were relegated to the Second Division a year after promotion.

=== 1987 ===
- Tottenham manager David Pleat resigned after rumors in the media alleged that he had been involved in a vice ring. He was replaced by Terry Venables.
- Coventry City win the first major trophy in their history by defeating Tottenham Hotspur (who were unbeaten in their previous seven finals) 3–2 in the FA Cup final.
- Everton win their ninth league title despite adversity, struggling with massive injuries all season but still managing to win the league by 11 clear points.
- Lincoln City became the first English club to suffer automatic relegation from the Football League after the re-election system was scrapped. They were replaced by Conference champions Scarborough.
- The Football League introduced play-offs to settle the final promotion place, initially including one team from the higher division.
- Former Aston Villa and Wales midfielder Trevor Hockey died of a heart attack at the age of 43.
- Arsenal became the first team to defeat Liverpool in a game in which Ian Rush had scored, by defeating them 2–1 at Wembley in the League Cup Final.
- Liverpool were forced to play their first few games of the season away from home after a sewer collapsed below the Spion Kop terrace.
- Ian Rush moved to Juventus, as agreed in his deal the previous summer.
- Portsmouth were promoted back to the First Division after 29 years away.
- Alex Ferguson began to rebuild Manchester United by signing Arsenal defender Viv Anderson, Celtic striker Brian McClair, and Norwich City defender Steve Bruce.
- Liverpool signed Watford and England winger John Barnes for £900,000 and replaced Ian Rush with Oxford United's John Aldridge for £750,000.

=== 1986 ===
- England were eliminated from the 1986 FIFA World Cup in the quarter-finals after losing 2–1 to Argentina, whose first goal had been an obviously deliberate handball by Diego Maradona—an act he quickly labeled the Hand of God goal. Argentina went on to win the competition.
- Liverpool win the league championship and FA Cup double in Kenny Dalglish's first season as player-manager, after Everton threw away their large advantage in the closing weeks of the season.
- Liverpool sold Ian Rush to Juventus of Italy for £3.2 million, but kept him for a season on loan.
- Sir Stanley Rous, one of the Football Association's most prominent administrators, died at the age of 90. Shortly after his death, a stand at Watford's Vicarage Road stadium was named in his honor.
- Wimbledon were promoted to the First Division in only their ninth season as a Football League club.
- Wolverhampton Wanderers completed a hat trick of successive relegations, falling into the Fourth Division for the first time in their history.
- Terry Venables signed two English-based strikers for Spanish club FC Barcelona—Mark Hughes from Manchester United for £2.2 million and Gary Lineker from Everton for £2.7 million.
- Oxford United survived their first season in the First Division and also won the Football League Cup.
- Wimbledon, who had joined the Football League just nine years earlier, were promoted to the First Division, completing a four-year rise from the Fourth Division.
- Swindon Town, Fourth Division champions, set a new Football League record of 102 points.
- Wolverhampton Wanderers suffered a third successive relegation and fell into the Fourth Division but were saved from going out of business by a new takeover deal, as were Middlesbrough after being relegated to the Third Division.
- West Ham United finished a club-best third in the league, just four points behind champions Liverpool.
- Manchester United manager Ron Atkinson was sacked in November after a poor start to the season and was instantly replaced by successful Aberdeen manager Alex Ferguson.

=== 1985 ===
- Everton win their eighth league title with five league games to spare. They then took their foot off the gas, losing three of their last five matches but still setting a club record points total.
- 56 spectators were burned to death and more than 200 were injured in a fire at Bradford City's Valley Parade stadium on 11 May.
- 39 spectators, most of them Italian, were trampled to death in rioting on the terraces of the Heysel Stadium at the European Cup final between Liverpool and Juventus. Despite the carnage, the match was played, and Juventus won 1–0. The tragedy resulted in a five-year ban on English clubs from European competition, with a six-year ban on Liverpool.
- Everton established themselves as one of the strongest club sides in Europe after winning the league championship with four matches to spare and adding the Cup Winners' Cup to their trophy cabinet.
- Anton Johnson was banned from football for life after it was revealed that he had illegally taken control of two football clubs (Southend United and Rotherham United) at the same time and had also mishandled the finances of both clubs.
- Preston North End and Burnley were both relegated to the Fourth Division for the first time.
- 16-year-old Matthew Le Tissier finished a trial at Oxford United and signed for Southampton.
- Oxford United were promoted to the top flight after claiming the Second Division championship, just a year after winning the Third Division championship in 1984, becoming the only club to have won two consecutive championships on the way to the top flight.
- A 14-year-old boy was crushed to death by a collapsed wall when Leeds United fans rioted during the last game of the Second Division season at Birmingham City, but media coverage and public attention of the tragedy were overshadowed as it occurred on the same afternoon as the Bradford City fire.
- Harry Catterick, who managed Everton to league title glory in 1963 and 1970 as well as an FA Cup triumph in 1966, died from a heart attack while watching their FA Cup quarter-final win over Ipswich Town at Goodison Park.

=== 1984 ===
- Liverpool became the first English club to win three major competitions in the same season when they won the league championship, the League Cup, and the European Cup in Joe Fagan's first season as manager.
- Tottenham Hotspur win the UEFA Cup.
- Everton defeated Watford in the FA Cup final to win their first major trophy under the management of Howard Kendall.
- Kevin Keegan ended his playing career after helping Newcastle United win promotion to the First Division.
- Ian Rush was voted Footballer of the Year by the FWA after scoring 32 goals to help Liverpool win their third successive league title.
- Terry Venables signed Tottenham player Steve Archibald for Spanish club FC Barcelona for £1.15 million.
- Tony Barton was sacked after two and a half years as manager of Aston Villa. He had won the European Cup just three months after being appointed. Villa replaced him with Shrewsbury Town's manager Graham Turner.
- Southampton finished a club-best second place in the First Division.
- Sheffield Wednesday returned to the First Division after 14 years away.
- Manchester United sold England midfielder Ray Wilkins to A.C. Milan of Italy for £1.5 million and replaced him with Scotland and Aberdeen's Gordon Strachan for £500,000.

=== 1983 ===
- The Football Association and the Scottish Football Association initiated the end of the British Home Championships by announcing they would not enter after the 1983–84 competition.
- Liverpool retained both the League Cup and league title.
- Manchester United defeated Brighton & Hove Albion 4–0 in the FA Cup replay after a 2–2 draw in the first match, winning their first major trophy under the management of Ron Atkinson.
- Watford finished second in the league at the end of their first season in the First Division.
- The Football Association kept faith in England manager Bobby Robson despite the country's failure to qualify for the 1984 European Football Championship.
- Bob Paisley retired after nine years as Liverpool manager. He finished on a high with the league championship and League Cup, bringing his tally of major prizes to an English record of 21. His successor was 62-year-old coach Joe Fagan.
- Sharp Electronics became the first official sponsors of Manchester United.
- Manchester United and England winger Steve Coppell retired from playing at the age of 28 due to a knee injury.

=== 1982 ===
- Ron Greenwood retired as England manager after the 1982 FIFA World Cup, which was won by Italy. He was replaced by Ipswich Town manager Bobby Robson.
- Liverpool win their thirteenth League championship and their second League Cup title.
- Just three months after stepping up from the coaching staff to replace Ron Saunders, Tony Barton guided Aston Villa to glory in the European Cup—they defeated FC Bayern Munich 1–0 thanks to a Peter Withe goal.
- JVC Electronics became the first official sponsors of Arsenal.
- Tottenham Hotspur defeated Queens Park Rangers—managed by former Tottenham midfielder Terry Venables—to win the FA Cup for the second year running. However, Argentine players Ossie Ardiles and Ricardo Villa missed the final due to hostility from fans over the Falklands War.
- Swansea City finished sixth in their first season as a First Division club, after having topped the league on several occasions.
- Watford win promotion to the First Division for the first time in their history.
- Bristol City declared bankruptcy and reformed under a new company, BCFC 1982.

=== 1981 ===
- The Football League began awarding three points for a win instead of two.
- Aston Villa win their first league championship in 71 years.
- Ipswich Town joined the list of triumphant English clubs in Europe by winning the UEFA Cup.
- Liverpool win their third European Cup and their first-ever League Cup in a season where they failed to make a serious bid for the league title.
- Tottenham Hotspur win the FA Cup.
- Bill Shankly died of a heart attack aged 68, seven years after he retired as Liverpool manager.
- Ron Atkinson replaced Dave Sexton as manager of Manchester United. Three months after his appointment, West Bromwich Albion midfielder Bryan Robson followed his old manager to Old Trafford for an English record fee of £1.75 million.

=== 1980 ===
- Liverpool win a second consecutive league championship.
- Nottingham Forest retained their European Cup crown, making them the only team to have won more European Cups than league titles.
- Manchester United chairman Louis Edwards, 65, died of a heart attack weeks after being accused of financial irregularities by ITV. Control of the club passed to his son Martin.
- West Ham defeated Arsenal in the FA Cup final to become the third Second Division team in eight years to win the trophy, thanks to a Trevor Brooking goal.
- Dixie Dean, who scored 60 goals for Everton during the 1927–28 season, died of a heart attack at the age of 73 while watching an Everton v Liverpool game at Goodison Park on 1 March.
- Emlyn Hughes, who had achieved numerous successes with Liverpool before his transfer to Wolves in 1979, added the League Cup to his list of honours after helping them overcome Nottingham Forest in the final.

== 1970s ==
1979 – 1978 – 1977 – 1976 – 1975 – 1974 – 1973 – 1972 – 1971 – 1970

=== 1979 ===
- Nottingham Forest lost their defense of the league title to Liverpool but compensated by winning the European Cup.
- One of Nottingham Forest's key players in the European triumph was Trevor Francis, who, four months earlier, had signed from Birmingham City and became Britain's first million-pound footballer.
- Arsenal overcame a late revival by Manchester United to win 3–2 in the FA Cup final – their first major trophy since Terry Neill replaced Bertie Mee as manager.
- West Bromwich Albion finished third in the league with a side containing three black players – Laurie Cunningham, Cyrille Regis, and Brendan Batson – who were known as The Three Degrees. Ron Atkinson's side had achieved a famous 5–3 away win over Manchester United on 29 December to put pressure on the title race.
- Danny Blanchflower's short-lived and unsuccessful reign as manager of Chelsea came to an end after the club suffered relegation to the Second Division.
- Brighton & Hove Albion were promoted to the top flight for the first time in their history.

=== 1978 ===
- Newly promoted Nottingham Forest win the league title and League Cup for the first time in their history. As of 2021–22, they remain the last newly promoted club to become league champions.
- Ipswich Town win the FA Cup for the first time in their history.
- West Bromwich Albion appointed Cambridge United's Ron Atkinson as manager.
- Wigan Athletic were elected to the Football League in place of Southport.
- Tottenham Hotspur, back in the First Division after a one-year absence, signed two Argentine World Cup winners – Osvaldo Ardiles and Ricardo Villa – for a combined fee of £750,000.
- Liverpool became the first British club to retain the European Cup by defeating FC Bruges 1–0 at Wembley, thanks to a Kenny Dalglish strike.

=== 1977 ===
- Tommy Docherty was sacked as manager of Manchester United just weeks after guiding them to FA Cup victory over Liverpool. He was replaced by Dave Sexton.
- Liverpool established themselves as one of Europe's finest sides by retaining the league title and joining the list of European Cup winners.
- Aston Villa win their second League Cup in three years. Nineteen-year-old striker Andy Gray was voted PFA Player of the Year and PFA Young Player of the Year. He remained the only player to have won both in the same season until Cristiano Ronaldo in 2006–07.
- Peter Houseman, who played in Chelsea's FA Cup and Cup Winners' Cup winning teams of 1970 and 1971, was killed in a car crash near Oxford at the age of 31, along with his wife.
- Wimbledon were elected to the Football League in place of Workington.
- Kenny Dalglish joined Liverpool for a record £440,000 to replace Kevin Keegan, who left to join Hamburg in Germany.
- After a 2–1 victory for Scotland against England in the British Home Championship at Wembley Stadium, the Tartan Army invaded the pitch, breaking goalposts and taking pieces of Wembley's turf.

=== 1976 ===
- Liverpool win the league championship for a record ninth time, ending manager Bob Paisley's two-year quest to bring a major trophy to Anfield.
- Southampton defeated Manchester United 1–0 in the FA Cup final, thanks to a goal from Bobby Stokes.
- Pop star Elton John became the new chairman of Fourth Division Watford and appointed Lincoln City manager Graham Taylor as manager.
- Queens Park Rangers finished league runners-up, achieving their highest-ever league position.
- Bertie Mee retired as manager of Arsenal and was replaced by Terry Neill.

=== 1975 ===
- Derby County, in Dave Mackay's first full season as manager, win their second league title in four years, adding to the 1972 championship which had been won by Mackay's predecessor, Brian Clough.
- John Lyall ended his first season as West Ham manager with an FA Cup triumph at the expense of Fulham, whose side included former West Ham captain Bobby Moore.
- Carlisle United, who had topped the 1974–75 First Division after three games, were relegated after failing to put together a consistent run of good form in their first season as a top-division club.
- Manchester United were promoted back to the First Division one season after losing their top-flight status.
- Aston Villa re-established themselves as a top English side by winning the League Cup and gaining promotion to the First Division in the same season.

=== 1974 ===
- The Football Association scrapped the distinction between professional and amateur players, leading to no more UK teams being entered for the Olympics.
- Sir Alf Ramsey lost his job due to England's failure to qualify for the World Cup. He was succeeded by Leeds United manager Don Revie.
- Liverpool win the FA Cup for a second time after an emphatic victory over Newcastle United.
- Leeds United became league champions in their final season under Don Revie's management. Former Derby County manager Brian Clough was appointed but left after 44 days and was subsequently replaced by Jimmy Armfield.
- George Best finally left Manchester United after three years of uncertainty fueled by off-the-field problems. He joined Stockport County.
- Bill Shankly retired after 15 successful years as Liverpool manager and was replaced by 55-year-old coach Bob Paisley.
- Manchester United were relegated to the Second Division for the first time since the 1930s. Their fate was sealed when former player Denis Law scored the winning goal for Manchester City at Old Trafford with his final touch in league football. However, Birmingham City's victory would have condemned United to relegation regardless of the outcome of their game.
- Former Football League side Bradford Park Avenue went into liquidation and were reformed as a Sunday league side.
- Liverpool win the first FA Charity Shield match to be decided by a penalty shootout and the first to be played at Wembley Stadium.

=== 1973 ===
- An Ian Porterfield goal gave Second Division Sunderland a shock win over Leeds United in the FA Cup final.
- Leeds United also lost their title chances, and Liverpool were crowned league champions instead.
- Bobby Charlton and Denis Law both left Manchester United after long and illustrious careers.
- The Football League announced that three clubs, instead of two, would be relegated from the First and Second Divisions from the end of the 1973–74 season onward, with three clubs being promoted to the Second and Third Divisions. The four-up, four-down system between the Third and Fourth Divisions would continue.
- Hereford United ended their first season as a Football League club by winning promotion from the Fourth Division.

=== 1972 ===
- Stoke City win the League Cup, recording the first major trophy in their history.
- Derby County, managed by 37-year-old Brian Clough, win the first league championship in their history.
- Tottenham Hotspur win the UEFA Cup, becoming the first British team to win two European trophies.
- Leeds United win the FA Cup for the first time, adding it to their growing list of honors.
- Manchester United sacked manager Frank O'Farrell and replaced him with Scottish national coach Tommy Docherty.
- Hereford United, four months after achieving a shock win over Newcastle United in the FA Cup, were elected to the Football League in place of Barrow.

=== 1971 ===
- Arsenal became the fourth English club to win the league championship and FA Cup double.
- 20-year-old Kevin Keegan left Scunthorpe United to join Liverpool for £35,000.
- Leeds United win the last-ever Inter-Cities Fairs Cup before the competition was abolished and replaced with the UEFA Cup.
- Chelsea defeated Real Madrid in the European Cup Winners' Cup final to claim their first European trophy.
- Manchester United appointed Leicester City's Frank O'Farrell as their permanent successor to Wilf McGuinness.
- Alvechurch progressed to the first round of the FA Cup after taking Oxford City to a record six replays in the qualifying round.

=== 1970 ===
- England lost their defense of the World Cup to Brazil.
- Everton win the league title, finishing one point short of the record.
- Wilf McGuinness was sacked just before the turn of 1971 after 18 months in charge of Manchester United. Sir Matt Busby took control of first-team affairs until the end of the season.
- The FA Cup final went to a replay for the first time. Chelsea defeated Leeds United 2–1 at Old Trafford after drawing 2–2 in the first game at Wembley.
- Cambridge United were elected to the Football League in place of Bradford Park Avenue.
- In the Bogotá Bracelet incident, Bobby Moore was accused of stealing a bracelet while in Colombia with the England squad for the 1970 FIFA World Cup, but all charges were quickly dropped.

== 1960s ==
1969 – 1968 – 1967 – 1966 – 1965 – 1964 – 1963 – 1962 – 1961 – 1960

=== 1969 ===
- Leeds United win the first league championship in their history.
- Manchester City continued their run of success under the management of Joe Mercer by winning the FA Cup.
- Sir Matt Busby retired after 24 years as manager of Manchester United and was replaced by 32-year-old reserve team coach Wilf McGuinness, a surprise choice after big names like Don Revie and Jock Stein had been linked with the job.
- Newcastle United win the European Fairs Cup to end their 14-year wait for a major trophy.
- Dave Mackay and Tony Book were joint winners of the Football Writers Association (FWA) Player of the Year award.

=== 1968 ===
- For the first time, two English teams won European competitions in the same season:
  - Manchester United defeated Benfica 4–1 in extra time at Wembley to win the European Cup, with goals from Bobby Charlton (twice), George Best, and 19-year-old Brian Kidd, who was covering for the injured Denis Law.
  - Leeds United win the first major trophies in their history, claiming the Football League Cup with a 1–0 victory over Arsenal and the Inter-Cities Fairs Cup with a 1–0 aggregate victory over Ferencvárosi TC.
- Manchester City win the league championship for only the second time in their history.
- A Jeff Astle goal against Everton in the FA Cup final gave West Bromwich Albion their fifth triumph in the history of the competition.
- George Best, 22, was voted European Footballer of the Year after a brilliant season, rounded off by scoring a goal in the European Cup final.
- Matt Busby was knighted after guiding Manchester United to the European Cup title.

=== 1967 ===
- Manchester United win the league championship – their fifth under Matt Busby and their seventh of all time, as well as their last for the next 26 years, until the formation of the Premier League.
- Tottenham Hotspur defeated Chelsea 2–1 in the FA Cup final.
- Queens Park Rangers beat West Bromwich Albion in the first one-game League Cup final.
- Goalkeeper Harry Gregg left Manchester United after 10 years, during which he established himself as one of the best goalkeepers in the English game, but with no medals to show for it: he had missed the 1963 FA Cup final due to injury and had not played enough games to qualify for a medal when United won the league in 1965 and 1967.
- Coventry City, managed by Jimmy Hill, win the Second Division championship and were promoted to the First Division for the first time in their history.

=== 1966 ===
- England win the 1966 FIFA World Cup 4–2 against West Germany in extra time as Geoff Hurst became the first man to score a hat-trick in a World Cup final, with two of his goals being controversial. Martin Peters also scored for England.
- Alf Ramsey received a knighthood for inspiring England's World Cup glory.
- Everton win the FA Cup after defeating Sheffield Wednesday 3–2 in the final at Wembley.
- Manchester United lost the defense of the league championship trophy to Liverpool.
- Manchester United's Bobby Charlton was voted European Footballer of the Year.

=== 1965 ===
- Manchester United win their first league title since the Munich air disaster.
- Liverpool win the FA Cup for the first time in their history.
- West Ham win the European Cup Winners' Cup, bringing the total of English clubs winning European trophies to two.
- Eric Brook, all-time record goalscorer for Manchester City, died at the age of 57.
- Stanley Matthews played his last game for Stoke City at the age of 50 and received a knighthood shortly afterward.

=== 1964 ===
- Match of the Day made its debut on BBC2 at 6:30 pm on 22 August with highlights of Liverpool's 3–2 home win over Arsenal. Kenneth Wolstenholme served as both presenter and commentator to an audience of just 20,000.
- Liverpool win the league championship to claim their first major trophy under the management of Bill Shankly.
- West Ham win the FA Cup, claiming the first major trophy in their history.
- Tottenham Hotspur inside-forward John White was struck by lightning on a North London golf course and died instantly at the age of 27.
- Tottenham Hotspur captain Danny Blanchflower retired as a player at the age of 37 after failing to overcome a serious knee injury.

=== 1963 ===
- Tottenham Hotspur win the Cup Winners' Cup to establish themselves as the first English club to win a European competition.
- Everton win their first league championship of the postwar years.
- Manchester United win the FA Cup for the first time in 15 years. It is their first major trophy since the Munich air disaster five years earlier.
- Birmingham City beat Aston Villa 3–1 on aggregate in the League Cup final to win the first major trophy of their history.
- 1911 FA Cup winners Bradford City finish second from bottom in the Fourth Division and have to seek re-election in order to preserve their Football League place.

=== 1962 ===
- Tottenham Hotspur beat Burnley (also league runners-up) at Wembley to retain the FA Cup.
- Norwich City beat Rochdale 4–0 on aggregate to win the League Cup – the first major trophy of their history.
- Ipswich Town are crowned league champions in their first season as a First Division club.
- Walter Winterbottom retires after 16 years as England manager and is replaced by Ipswich Town manager, Alf Ramsey.
- Accrington Stanley resign from the Football League in March and their Fourth Division records are expunged. Their place in the league for 1962–63 is given to Southern Football League champions Oxford United.

=== 1961 ===
- Tottenham Hotspur become the first club of the 20th century to win the league championship and FA Cup double.
- Aston Villa played Rotherham United in the first-ever League Cup final. The second leg of the final is withheld until the 1961–62 season due to fixture congestion.
- Leeds United appoint former Leicester City and Manchester City player Don Revie, 33, as their new player-manager.
- Manchester City sell 21-year-old Scottish striker Denis Law to Torino of Italy in the first £100,000 deal involving a British club.
- Terry Bly scores 52 league goals for Peterborough United as they complete their first league season as Fourth Division champions.

=== 1960 ===
- Burnley overcome a spirited challenge of 106-goal Wolves to win the league championship.
- Wolves compensate for their league championship disappointment by overcoming Blackburn Rovers in the FA Cup final.
- Oldham Athletic, league runners-up 45 years earlier, finish second from bottom in the Fourth Division but retain their league status after the Football League's members vote for Gateshead to go down and Midland League champions Peterborough United to go up for the 1960–61 season.
- Former Arsenal and Sunderland player Charlie Buchan dies at the age of 68.
- Aston Villa win the Second Division championship to regain their First Division status a year after losing it.

== 1950s ==
1959 – 1958 – 1957 – 1956 – 1955 – 1954 – 1953

=== 1959 ===
- Bill Shankly is appointed manager of Liverpool
- Wolves retain the league championship despite a spirited challenge from a new-look Manchester United.
- Nottingham Forest win the FA Cup for the first time since 1898.
- Port Vale win the first-ever Fourth Division championship after scoring 110 league goals.
- Billy Wright becomes the first player to play 100 times for England.
- Birmingham City and England full-back Jeff Hall dies at the age of 29.

=== 1958 ===
- In an incident known as the Munich air disaster, eight Manchester United players die and two more have their careers ended by injury after a plane crash at Munich-Riem Airport. Manager Matt Busby is badly injured and spends two months in hospital recovering from multiple injuries.
- A makeshift Manchester United side reach the FA Cup Final, but lose 2–0 to Bolton.
- Wolves win the league championship for the second time and qualify for the European Cup for the first time.
- Sunderland are relegated from the First Division for the first time, having been in the top division every season since joining the Football League in 1890.
- Former Manchester United and Manchester City winger Billy Meredith dies aged 83.

=== 1957 ===
- Manchester United win the league title for the second year running.
- Aston Villa beat Manchester United 2–1 in the FA Cup final to win the trophy for a record seventh time. Their victory denies United the double, meaning Villa are still the last team to achieve the feat, back in 1896–97.
- Stanley Matthews retires from international football at the age of 42, but continues his club career with Blackpool.
- Charlton Athletic turn the tables on Huddersfield Town during the final 20 minutes of a Second Division fixture by turning a 5–1 deficit into a 7–6 lead.
- Eastbourne United manager Ron Greenwood, 36, is appointed first-team coach of Arsenal.

=== 1956 ===
- Manchester United win the league championship with a reshaped side containing mostly young players including Duncan Edwards (19), David Pegg (20), Albert Scanlon (20) and Mark Jones (22). They become England's first representatives in the European Cup, in the competition's second season, as the previous league champions Chelsea were blocked from entering the inaugural tournament by the Football Association.
- German goalkeeper Bert Trautmann plays through Manchester City's FA Cup victory over Birmingham City despite suffering what an X-ray later confirms as a broken neck, and was able to continue his career.
- The top three sides in the Third Division South – Leyton Orient, Brighton & Hove Albion and Ipswich Town – all score over 100 league goals.

=== 1955 ===
- Chelsea win the league championship for the first time in their history.
- Blackburn Rovers score 106 Second Division goals but concede 79 times and sixth place is not high enough for promotion to the First Division.
- Newcastle United win the FA Cup after beating Manchester City 3–1 at Wembley.
- Duncan Edwards, 18-year-old Manchester United wing-half, becomes England's youngest international when he plays in a side containing 40-year-old Stanley Matthews, who had played for England before Edwards was born.

=== 1954 ===
- Wolves win the league title for the first time in their history.
- West Bromwich Albion complete a double for clubs in central England by winning the FA Cup for the fourth time in their history.
- Everton finish Second Division runners-up, are promoted to the First Division and have remained there ever since.
- Bournemouth & Boscombe Athletic and Swindon Town are bracketed together in 19th place in the Third Division South having both accumulated 40 league points, scored 67 goals and conceded 70 goals.

=== 1953 ===
- 38-year-old Stanley Matthews is instrumental in turning Blackpool's 3–1 deficit into a 4–3 victory against Bolton Wanderers in the FA Cup final, ending his 20-year hunt for a major trophy. The final is still widely known as the 'Matthews Final', despite the fact that his teammate Stan Mortensen scored a hat-trick in the game.
- Arsenal win a record-breaking seventh league title with a superior goal difference over Preston North End, who also finished on 54 points
- England's unbeaten home record against a non-British nation ends when they lose 6–3 to the then-Hungarian Aranycsapat at Wembley.

=== 1952 ===
- Manchester United win their first top-flight title in 41 years under the guidance of Matt Busby.
- Newcastle United become one of a few teams to win the FA Cup two years in succession.

=== 1951 ===
- Tottenham Hotspur win the First Division for the first time in their history, only a season after their promotion.

=== 1950 ===
- Portsmouth defend their league title on goal average after finishing level on points with Wolverhampton Wanderers.

== 1940s ==
=== 1949 ===
- Portsmouth win their first league title, 10 years after winning the FA Cup.

=== 1948 ===
- 83,260 watch Manchester United vs Arsenal at Maine Road on 17 January to become the highest attendance at an English league game.
- Manchester United end a 37-year trophy drought after beating Blackpool to win the FA Cup.
- Arsenal win the top flight title.

=== 1947 ===
- After a close three-horse title race, Liverpool win the first post-war league championship.
- Charlton Athletic win the FA Cup, their first and only major trophy to date.

=== 1946 ===
- Football League North (Wartime – Joint Division One League with Football League South)
- Champions: Sheffield United
- Derby County become the first team to win the FA Cup after losing a game when two-legged games are introduced for one season only.
- League football resumes following the end of the Second World War.
- The Football Association end their boycott of FIFA, paving the way for England to play in World Cup matches.

== 1930s ==
=== 1939 ===
- The Football League is abandoned three games into the new season after the outbreak of the Second World War
- Portsmouth beat Wolverhampton Wanderers 4–1 in the FA Cup final.

=== 1938 ===
- Manchester City become the first and only defending Champions to be relegated.

=== 1936 ===
- Sunderland A.F.C. win their sixth league championship.
- Founding Football League members, Aston Villa and Blackburn Rovers are relegated to the second division.

=== 1935 ===
- Arsenal win their third successive league title.

=== 1934 ===
- Arsenal and Huddersfield Town's manager Herbert Chapman dies of pneumonia on 6 January.
- 84,569 watch Manchester City defeat Stoke City at Maine Road in the FA Cup 6th Round, the biggest crowd ever recorded for an English game outside of Wembley Stadium.

=== 1932 ===
- Everton win the league championship after a year's absence from the First Division.
- Newcastle United win their third FA Cup trophy.

=== 1931 ===
- Aston Villa set an all-time top-flight record of 128 goals in a season, but still finish runners-up to Arsenal by seven points.
- Second division West Bromwich Albion win the FA Cup.

=== 1930 ===
- Sheffield Wednesday defend their league championship, winning their fourth league title.
- Arsenal win their first ever major trophy, the FA Cup.
- Everton are relegated for the first time, just two years after being crowned top flight league champions.

== 1920s ==
=== 1929 ===
- Sheffield Wednesday win the league championship by a point.
- Bolton Wanderers win the FA Cup for the third time.

=== 1928 ===
- Arsenal and Chelsea are the first clubs to play with shirt numbers on 25 August.
- Dixie Dean becomes the first and only player to score 60 goals in one season in English football, helping Everton to win the top flight title.
- Blackburn Rovers equal Aston Villa's record of six FA Cup wins.

=== 1927 ===
- Newcastle United win their fourth and last top-flight title to date.
- FA Cup: Cardiff City 1 Arsenal 0
- The FA Cup is won by a team outside England for the first time prompting it to become known as the FA Cup rather than the English Cup as previously.

=== 1926 ===
- Huddersfield Town become the first team to be the Football League champions three seasons in succession.

=== 1925 ===
- FA Cup: Sheffield United 1–0 Cardiff City
- Sheffield United F.C. win the FA Cup, their last major trophy to this day. Runners-up: Cardiff City
- The offside rule is changed: a player is now onside if a minimum of two (instead of three) opposing players are between him and the goal line.

=== 1924 ===
- Huddersfield Town win the league for the first time.
- FA Cup: Corinthian 1-0 Blackburn Rovers
- A major shock in the first round as five-time Cup winners, and First Division staple, Blackburn Rovers, are unexpectedly beaten by the amateurs of Corinthian F.C. at the Crystal Palace.
- Newcastle United beat Aston Villa to win the FA Cup in what became known as the "Rainy Day Final" due to the weather and pitch conditions.

=== 1923 ===
- Liverpool win a second consecutive league championship, a fourth in total.
- Bolton Wanderers defeat West Ham United 2–0 in the first FA Cup final to be held at Wembley. The match kicked off 44 minutes late due to overcrowding – there was an estimated 200,000 fans in attendance, and it was not until a police constable on a white police horse helped clear the pitch that the match took place. As a result, the match is now known as the White Horse Final.
- Aston Villa centre-half Tommy Ball is shot dead by his neighbour in November thus becoming the only Football League player to have been murdered.

=== 1921 ===
- The Football League is increased to 92 clubs with the Third Division becoming the Third Division South and the introduction of 24 new clubs in the Third Division North.
- Burnley win their first top flight title, going a record 30 matches unbeaten

=== 1920 ===
- The Southern League's top division is absorbed into the Football League creating the Football League Third Division
- Aston Villa capture the FA Cup for a record sixth time.

== 1910s ==
=== 1919 ===
- Leeds City are expelled and dissolved by the football league after financial irregularities including the payment of players during the First World War. In its place, a new club is formed, Leeds United.

=== 1915 ===
- Everton win the final league title before league football is suspended because of the First World War.
- FA Cup Final: Sheffield United 3–0 Chelsea.
- Sheffield United F.C. win the FA Cup.

=== 1914 ===
- Blackburn Rovers win their second league title and their second in three seasons.

=== 1913 ===
- Sunderland A.F.C. beat Aston Villa to win their fifth league championship.
- Aston Villa defeat Sunderland to win the FA Cup.

=== 1912 ===
- Blackburn Rovers succeed in winning their first league title.

=== 1911 ===
- Bradford City win the FA Cup, its only major honor.

=== 1910 ===
- Aston Villa win the league championship for a record sixth time.
- Brighton & Hove Albion, champions of the Southern Football League, defeat Aston Villa, Football League champions, to win the 1910 FA Charity Shield, their only top-flight honor to date.
- Millwall leave East London, relocating to The Den in South London.

== 1900s ==
=== 1909 ===
- The Charity Shield is inaugurated.
- Manchester United win their first-ever FA Cup title.

=== 1908 ===
- Manchester United F.C. win their first league championship.
- The United Kingdom national football team, then competing under the name Great Britain and Ireland, win the gold medal in the first official football tournament at the 1908 Summer Olympics.
- Second division Wolverhampton Wanderers upset the odds by beating previous season's league champions Newcastle United in the FA Cup final.

=== 1907 ===
- The action by the Football Association in 1885 leads to the breakaway and formation of the Amateur Football Association.
- Professional Footballers' Association formed.

=== 1906 ===
- Liverpool F.C. win their second league championship.
- Everton win the FA Cup for the first time.

=== 1905 ===
- Norwich City F.C. ousted from amateur football and deemed a professional organisation by the FA.
- Alf Common becomes the first £1,000 transfer when he moves from Sunderland to Middlesbrough.
- Chelsea Football Club is founded at The Rising Sun pub (now The Butcher's Hook), Fulham Road, London, on 14 March and, like Bradford City in 1903, are immediately elected to the league.
- Aston Villa win the FA Cup.
- Crystal Palace is founded on 10 September by workers at Joseph Paxton's famous Crystal Palace, in Sydenham.

=== 1904 ===
- Sheffield Wednesday win their first-ever league championship.
- Manchester City win the FA Cup.

=== 1903 ===
- Bradford City are elected to the Football League before they have ever played a game.

=== 1902 ===
- Norwich City FC is formed as an amateur club.
- Sunderland A.F.C. win their fourth league championship.
- J.H. Davies takes over near-bankrupt Newton Heath (L&YR) F.C. and changes its name to Manchester United.
- Sheffield United win the FA Cup. Runners-up: Southampton.
- Sheffield United 1–1 Southampton – (R) Sheffield United 2–1 Southampton.

=== 1901 ===
- Tottenham Hotspur become the first non-league club to win the FA Cup. Runners Up: Sheffield United F.C
- Tottenham Hotspur 2–2 Sheffield United – (R) Tottenham Hotspur 3–1 Sheffield United
- Liverpool F.C. win their first league title.

=== 1900 ===
- Aston Villa win the league championship, their fifth title in seven years.
- Sheffield United F.C finish second.
- Sunderland finish third.
- Leading goalscorer Billy Garraty (Aston Villa): 27.
- Brighton & Hove Albion is founded.

== 1890s ==
=== 1899 ===
- Aston Villa win the last championship of the 1800s, defeating runners-up Liverpool F.C. 5–0 in the last match to secure the title.
- Sheffield United F.C. win the FA Cup. Runners-up: Derby County.
- Scunthorpe United F.C. is formed.

=== 1898 ===
- Sheffield United F.C. secure the league title for the first and only time. Sunderland finish second, and Wolverhampton Wanderers finish third.
- Leading goalscorer: Fred Wheldon (Aston Villa), 21.
- Portsmouth F.C. is formed.

=== 1897 ===
- Aston Villa capture their third league title and the FA Cup to win the second Double in English football. Sheffield United finish second, and Derby County finish third.
- Leading goalscorer: Steve Bloomer (Derby County), 22.

=== 1896 ===
- Aston Villa capture the league title.

=== 1895 ===
- Sunderland A.F.C. become the first team to win the league championship three times.
- Aston Villa win the FA Cup. The Cup is then stolen from the window of a shop in Aston, Birmingham and never found. A replacement is made.
- Thames Ironworks F.C. are formed as the works team of the Thames Ironworks and Shipbuilding Company. The club would later be reformed as West Ham United.

=== 1894 ===
- Aston Villa win their first league championship. Later that year though their former captain Archie Hunter dies aged just 35.
- Formerly St Mark's West Gorton and Aldwick Association FC are renamed Manchester City.

=== 1893 ===
- Sunderland A.F.C. retain league championship.

=== 1892 ===
- Sunderland A.F.C. win their first league championship.
- Expansion of the Football League to two divisions.
- John Houlding, owner of Anfield, founds Liverpool Football Club on 15 March.
- West Bromwich Albion defeat Aston Villa in the FA Cup final. There are suspicions over the performance of Villa keeper Jimmy Warner. His pub is burned down by a mob and he never plays for the club again.

=== 1891 ===
- Everton win their first league championship.
- Luton Town become the south of England's first professional club in August – paying the entire team 2/6 (two shillings and sixpence) plus expenses.
- The penalty kick is introduced.
- Assistant referees are first introduced as linesmen.

=== 1890 ===
- Luton Town player Frank Whitby becomes the first professional player in the south of England on 15 December, earning five shillings per week.

== 1880s ==
=== 1889 ===
- Preston North End complete the first season of the Football League as unbeaten champions. They also become the first team to win the 'double', gaining the FA Cup without conceding a goal.
- Sheffield United is formed.

=== 1888 ===
- The oldest professional league in the world,The Football League is established by Aston Villa director William McGregor.

=== 1887 ===
- Aston Villa win their first FA Cup and the first Midland winners.

=== 1886 ===
- Blackburn Rovers win the FA Cup for a third year in a row.
- Plymouth Argyle F.C. are founded.
- Dial Square are founded, the team who went on to become Arsenal.

=== 1885 ===
- The threat of secession leads to the legislation of professionalism on 20 July by the Football Association making the British Football Association redundant.
- Luton Town, Millwall Rovers and Southampton founded.

=== 1884 ===
- Preston North End are suspended for one year from the FA Cup for paying players.
- Rules attempting to restrict professionalism, such as only Englishmen being allowed to play in the FA Cup, lead to the formation of the British Football Association as a rival to the Football Association.

=== 1883 ===
- The British Home Championship (also known as the Home International Championship) becomes an annual competition contested between the UK's four national teams, England, Scotland, Wales and Northern Ireland (Ireland before the late 1970s).
- Accrington are expelled from the Football Association for paying players.
- Bristol Rovers F.C. are formed.

=== 1882 ===
- The Football Association (England), the Scottish Football Association, the Football Association of Wales and the Irish Football Association meet on 6 December and agree on one uniform set of rules for football. They also establish the International Football Association Board (IFAB) to approve changes to the rules (a task that they still perform to this day).
- Burnley F.C. are formed
- Hotspur Football Club is formed (later to become Tottenham Hotspur).

=== 1881 ===
- Watford F.C. are formed.
- First Manchester derby occurred.

=== 1880 ===
- St. Mark's (West Gorton) are formed in Manchester.

== 1870s ==
=== 1879 ===
- Doncaster Rovers are formed.
- Sunderland A.F.C. are formed.
- Fulham F.C. are formed.

=== 1878 ===
- First floodlit football match played at Bramall Lane, Sheffield on 14 October 1878 in front of an attendance of 20,000.
- Newton Heath LYR Football Club was formed by the Carriage and Wagon department of the Lancashire and Yorkshire Railway depot at Newton Heath (later known as Manchester United Football Club).
- St. Domingo's FC is formed, later changing its name (in November 1879) to Everton.

=== 1876 ===
- Middlesbrough Football Club is formed.
- Birmingham Senior Cup, the first Association tournament on a local level, commences.

=== 1875 ===
- The crossbar is introduced, replacing tape as the means of marking the top of the goal.
- Birmingham City are formed, under the name Small Heath Alliance.
- Blackburn Rovers Football Club are formed.

=== 1874 ===
- Aston Villa Football Club is formed by 15 members of the Aston Villa Wesleyan Chapel, in Lozells, near Aston, Warwickshire.
- Bolton Wanderers F.C. are formed.

=== 1873 ===
- The Calthorpe football club is formed, as the first club in Birmingham playing solely to the Association laws.

=== 1872 ===
- Scotland and England draw 0–0, played at the West of Scotland Cricket Club. This is recognized by FIFA as the first official international match.
- Wanderers beat Royal Engineers in the first FA Cup final.

=== 1871 ===
- Charles William Alcock creates the Football Association Challenge Cup and the first FA Cup tournament takes place.
- Old Etonians F.C. formed.
- Southall F.C. formed.
- Uxbridge F.C. formed.
- Reading F.C. formed.
- The South Derbyshire Football Association was established in March 1871.

=== 1870 ===
- First "goalkeepers", and transition from "dribbling game" to "passing game" is seen in club matches in Sheffield and London.
- A match between England and Scotland, finishes in a 1–0 win for England at the Kennington Oval in London. This was the first match between the nations but is not recognized as being the first international (see 1872).
- Maidenhead United F.C., Marlow F.C. and Abingdon F.C. are established (Maidenhead and Marlow took part in the first FA Cup tournament the following year).

== 1860s ==
=== 1867 ===
- The first ever football tournament, the Youdan Cup, was played by twelve Sheffield clubs.
- 4 September 1867, Sheffield Wednesday Football Club was established.

=== 1865 ===
- Nottingham Forest F.C. is established.

=== 1863 ===
- The Football Association is founded and ratifies the original 14 rules of the game.

=== 1862 ===
- Notts County, the oldest professional football club in the world, is formed.

== 1850s ==
=== 1857 ===
- Sheffield F.C., the world's oldest football club, established and the Sheffield Rules developed.

== 1840s ==
=== 1849 ===
- Official referees appear for the first time in a football match in Cheltenham, two on the pitch and one in tribune.

=== 1848 ===
- The Cambridge Rules are created being the first attempt to establish formal rules.

=== 1846 ===
- A time limit on length of play is first introduced and first described in Lancashire.

=== 1845 ===
- First use of referee in English public school football games, from Eton football

=== 1842 ===
- First use of referee. During a match in Rochdale, between the Bodyguards club and the Fearnaught club

== 1820s ==
=== 1823 ===
- First description of a pass comes from Suffolk. In this Moor describes a team ball game with goals in which a player who can not advance further "throws the ball [he must in no case give it] to some less beleaguered friend more free and more in breath than himself". Although this description refers to throwing, Moor tells us that the game was at other times a football one: "Sometimes a large football was used; the game was then called 'kicking camp'."

== 1790s ==
=== 1796 ===
- Last meetings of The Gymnastic Society, the first football club in the world.

== See also ==
- Football in the United Kingdom
- Timeline of association football
- History of association football
- Football in England
