= Saltley College F.C. =

Defunct football club in England

- Full name: Saltley College Football Club
- Nickname: the Collegians
- Founded: 1873
- Dissolved: 1967?
- Ground: college grounds
Home colours

Saltley College F.C. was an association football club founded by the students and staff at St Peter's College, Saltley, in the 19th century. The club played a major role in the founding and rapid growth of association football, and, along with Calthorpe F.C., was one of the first football clubs in Birmingham.

== History ==
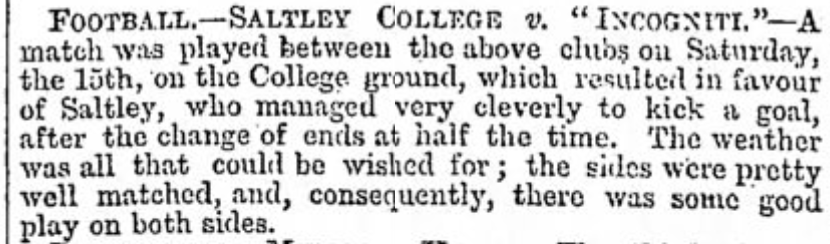
The College v Incogniti report.

The earliest reported match for the club - a 1–0 victory over Incogniti of Burton on 15 February 1873 - may have been the first game in Birmingham played under association football laws. A return match played at Adderley Park saw the College win by 5–0. At the time, the Sheffield rules were popular in the north of England, and the Calthorpe club, formed at around this time, was promoting the association laws.

The club was a founder member of the Birmingham Football Association and played in the first Birmingham Senior Cup in 1876–77, contributing £1 12s to the cost of the trophy. The club captain for 1876, William Thompson, introduced a passing game to the side in place of the dribbling game hitherto played, helping the club to the semi-finals of the competition in its first three seasons, beating Aston Villa in 1877–78 en route to losing to Wednesbury Strollers in front of a crowd of 2,000 at Villa's Wellington Road ground. The Collegians went further in 1879–80, reaching the final, beating Stoke in the third round, in a tie delayed to allow the students to return to college after a mid-term break. In the semi-finals the club lost 3–0 to Derby at the Aston Lower Grounds, but a protest was made that one of the Derby players was "cup-tied", having already played for Wednesbury Strollers in the Sheffield Challenge Cup, against the rules of the competition which barred any player from representing more than one side in competitive matches. The protest was upheld and the College team put into the final, where it faced Aston Villa at the Aston Lower Grounds in what was seen as a "certainty" for the Villans; the Aston side duly won 3–1. The match was the College's high point in football.

The team never entered the FA Cup and the next time they reached the quarter-finals of the Senior Cup, in 1881–82, they were beaten 6–0 at Wednesbury Old Athletic; the club's final match in the competition came the next season, a 9–0 defeat at Walsall Swifts in the third round. The Saltley College side continued playing in amateur football until 1967.

== Colours ==
The club listed its colours as blue or blue and white. It later added yellow trim and red stockings.

== Ground ==
The club's pitch in the college grounds was, like the Muntz Street ground of Small Heath Alliance, notorious for being "indented with furrows, which caused an approaching line of forwards to bear resemblance to a thinly-tenanted switchback-car". Partly as a result the club was unbeaten at home until losing to Wednesbury Old Athletic F.C. in October 1878, by the score of 10–3, "much to the surprise of [the club] and the other collegians who witnessed the match".

== Birmingham Senior Cup ==
=== 1876-77 ===
Date	Home	Score	Away
21 October 1876	Aston Unity	0–0	Saltley College
11 November 1876	Saltley College	2–1	Aston Unity

Second round

Date	Home	Score	Away
2 December 1876	Saltley College	beat	Tipton

Semi-finals

Date	Home	Score	Away	Attendance
24 February 1877	Wednesbury Old Athletic	2–0	Saltley College	1,500

== Notable players ==
The college was considered a nursery of footballing talent, relying strictly on "science" and avoiding charging, with the following players all attending the College:

- Thomas Slaney of Stoke City;
- John Brant Brodie and W. H. Barcroft of Wolverhampton Wanderers;
- George Copley, Tom Bryan (later of Wednesbury Strollers), and champion sprinter Charles S. Johnstone, all of Aston Villa.

The most famous college player was Teddy Johnson, who earned a cap for England in 1880, while captain of the College.

The College also provided players to the Birmingham FA representative side, such as Rutherford and Goodyear, who played in the matches against the London Football Association in 1878, and Johnson represented the Birmingham FA in the "junior international" against Scotland in 1880.
