= Shoemake =

Shoemake is a surname. Notable people with the surname include:

- Charlie Shoemake (born 1937), American jazz vibraphonist
- Hub Shoemake (1899–1984), American football player
- Kevin Shoemake (born 1965), British footballer
- Shockley Shoemake (1922–2015), American lawyer and politician
