= Blow football =

Tabletop game

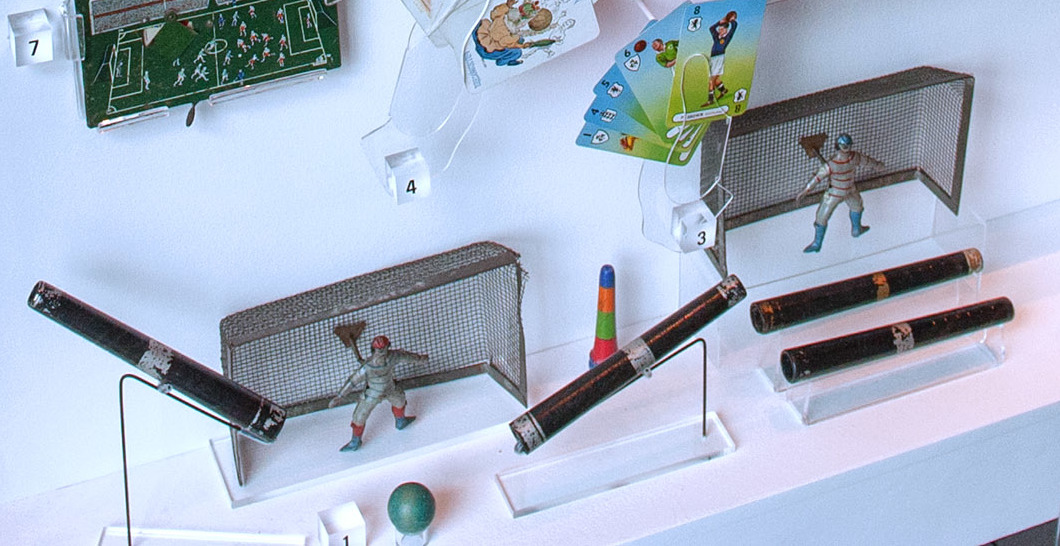
Straws and goals for a commercial blow football game

Blow football is a table-top game popular in the United Kingdom, where the object is to blow through some kind of pipe causing a small lightweight ball to pass through the opponent's goal, as in other forms of football. In 1893 Reuben Heaton patented his "Football for the Table" which he advertised as an "amusing game" for hotels, coffee house and clubs.

The game is often played with whatever materials are at hand, such as drinking straws, and ping-pong balls but is also sold as a boxed game in some toy shops. Boxed games typically contain a few plastic pipes, a ball, and two plastic goals. Some versions may include two plastic goalkeepers on sticks for the players to defend the goal with, or a football pitch laid out on a piece of cloth that is then put on a table and used as the playing surface, or even supply a rigid surface to play on, with raised boundaries so the ball cannot go out of bounds. At least two players are involved, though some sets will supply more pipes so the whole family can play. The pipes may be simple, or may have mouthpieces after the fashion of a pea shooter.

Various versions of the game were produced by Reuben Heaton, Spears Games, Peter Pan Playthings, J & L Randall and several manufacturers.

== In popular culture ==
Blow football is the subject season 2, episode 1 of the British comedy Toast of London.

== See also ==
- Zorbing
- Bubble football
- Soap Football
- Snap (gridiron football)
