= 1876–77 Birmingham Senior Cup =

Tournament details
- Country: England
- Venue: Bristol Road, Bournbrook
- Dates: 14 October 1876 – 24 March 1877
- Teams: 16

Final positions
- Champions: W.O.A.C.
- Runners-up: Stafford Road

Tournament statistics
- Matches played: 18

The 1876–77 Birmingham Senior Cup was the first edition of the Birmingham Senior Cup, the first football tournament other than the FA Cup played to Football Association laws, and therefore the first local senior tournament.

== Background ==
The Birmingham Football Association was founded in 1875 and took a subscription of £3 from its member clubs in order to commission a trophy for a member tournament, the trophy costing £50 and made by Mr R. Williams of Wednesbury. Not all of the clubs could afford the £3 subscription – the Harold club contributed 15s, Wednesbury Old Park 10s 6d, and Saltley College £1 12s. The bulk of the shortfall was met by the wealthy Calthorpe club, which contributed £7 7s, and Wednesbury Town and West Bromwich contributed £5 5s each.

By 1876, the association had 16 members, with 500–600 members all told, and all clubs entered the competition.

Until 1877, the Association laws did not specify the number of players per side, and it was agreed that the matches would be with 12 players per side. There was also some local leeway with regard to the laws of the game; in particular, the Birmingham local rules stipulated that "corner" kicks should be taken 20 yards from the goalposts, rather than the corner flag.

== Participating teams ==
Team	Founded	No. of members	Secretary	Home ground	Colours
Aston Harold	1876	N/A	Humphrey Wall	Aston Park	N/A
Aston Unity	1874	50	S. Durban	Aston Park	Royal Blue & White
Aston Villa	1874	45	D. J. Stephens	Wellington Road	Scarlet & Royal Blue jerseys
Calthorpe	1873	N/A	John Campbell Orr	Bristol Road	Dark Blue
Cannock	1875	N/A	John Pigott	Wolverhampton Road	Amber & Black jersey, Dark Blue stockings.
Harborne	1876	40	F. W. Lambert	Church Avenue	Scarlet & Black
Royal	1874	N/A	J. F. Jones	Calthorpe Park	Navy Blue & White
Saltley College	1873	80-100	William Thompson	College Grounds	Blue
St George's	1875	?	F. Bagnall	Fentham Road, Aston	Black with White Dragon
Stafford Road	1874	75	R. Gowland	Stafford Road, Wolverhampton	Narrow Black & White hoops
Tipton	1872	N/A	J. Spicer Leach	Horseley Road	Navy Blue
Victoria Swifts	1874	N/A	T. Spriggs	West Bromwich Road, Walsall	Amber & Black
Wednesbury Old Park	1875	N/A	J. Lowe	King's Hill Fields	Red & Black halves
Wednesbury Old Athletic	1874	N/A	W. Willies	Woodgreen	Scarlet & Black jersey. White knickers.
Wednesbury Town	1873	N/A	F. R. Gamble	Woodgreen	Maroon & White
West Bromwich	1875	56	James Roberts	Four Acres	Magenta & Blue

Details taken from the Football Annuals for 1876 (secretary names) and 1877 unless stated.

== Format ==
The competition was organised as a straight knockout tournament, with replays to a conclusion.

== Results ==
All results as given in History of the Birmingham Senior Cup by Steve Carr unless otherwise stated.

=== First round ===
Date	Home	Score	Away
14 October 1876	Wednesbury Town	2–1	Victoria Swifts
21 October 1876	Aston Unity	0–0	Saltley College
21 October 1876	Calthorpe	4–0	Royal
11 November 1876	Cannock	0–0	St George's
11 November 1876	Harborne	0–13	Wednesbury Old Athletic
11 November 1876	Stafford Road	1–0	West Bromwich
11 November 1876	Wednesbury Old Park	beat	Harold
18 November 1876	Aston Villa	0–1	Tipton

=== Replays ===
Date	Home	Score	Away
11 November 1876	Saltley College	2–1	Aston Unity
18 November 1876	St George's	0–0	Cannock
2 December 1876	Cannock	2–0	St George's

=== Second round ===
Date	Home	Score	Away
2 December 1876	Saltley College	beat	Tipton
23 December 1876	Wednesbury Old Athletic	2–0	Wednesbury Old Park
30 December 1876	Stafford Road	3–0	Cannock
13 January 1877	Wednesbury Town	2–0	Calthorpe

=== Semi-finals ===
Date	Home	Score	Away	Attendance
17 February 1877	Stafford Road	2–0	Wednesbury Town	
24 February 1877	Wednesbury Old Athletic	2–0	Saltley College	1,500

=== Final ===
The final was played at Calthorpe's ground on the Bristol Road. A special train left Wolverhampton at 2.05pm, calling at Wednesbury, West Bromwich, and Hockley, to allow the team members and their friends to travel to the final.

The Roadsters took a two-goal lead in the first half-an-hour of the match, both scored by Crump, but Page shot just under the bar for a goal back shortly before half-time. Holmes scored two quick goals in the second half, which were enough to secure the trophy for the Old Uns.

24 March 1877
16:15

Wednesbury Old Athletic	3–2	Stafford Road
Page; Holmes		Crump

Bristol Road, Bournbrook
Attendance: 2,500

W.O.A.C.	Stafford Road

Johnson kept goal for WOAC.

== Aftermath ==
Following the formal trophy presentation that evening, the Birmingham Football Association resolved to abolish the "hazardous custom" of charging in local matches, on the basis that it was too dangerous.
