= John Campbell Orr =

English footballer and administrator

Personal information
- Full name: John Campbell Orr
- Date of birth: 21 November 1850
- Place of birth: Glasgow
- Date of death: 16 November 1921 (aged 70)
- Place of death: Birmingham
- Position: Forward

Senior career*
Years	Team	Apps	(Gls)
1873–1879	B.C.A./Calthorpe		
- * Club domestic league appearances and goals

John Campbell Orr was an association football player and administrator, who was the most important figure of the promotion of the game in Birmingham in the 1870s.

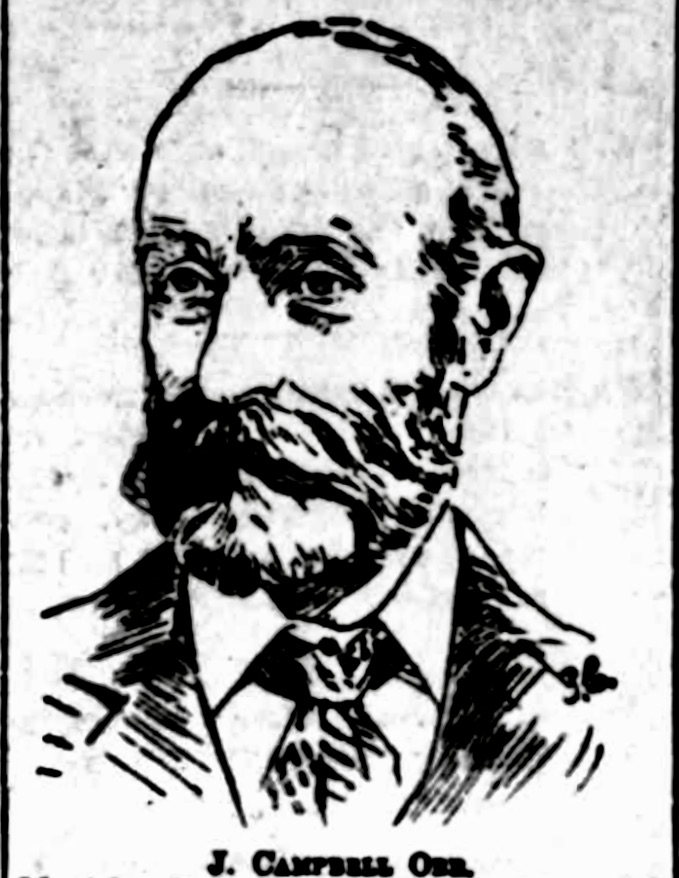
John Campbell Orr, Sports Argus, 12 May 1900

== Early life ==
Campbell Orr was born in Gorbals, Glasgow, the son of John Cunningham Orr (a bookseller and printer) and Wilhelmina, née Campbell. He was brought up in Cupar in Fifeshire and educated at Smeaton's School in St Andrews, recording 100% in the mathematics examinations in 1868. He matriculated at St Andrews University, which was a stronghold of rugby football, that year, and he represented the university at rugby; his final rugby match recorded, against Edinburgh Academical in February 1870, featured six future rugby internationals.

He did not graduate, in part due to the collapse of his father's business, and instead worked for a year as a clerk to a writer to the signet.

== Football ==
=== Foundation of Calthorpe F.C. ===
In 1873, he moved to Birmingham with a business partner, John Carson, who had been a member of the Queen's Park association football club. In October, Campbell Orr and Carson formed a footballing club for the young clerks in the area, and, after some discussion, Carson's view that the new club - originally called the Birmingham Clerks Association - should adopt the association code was accepted.

The new club, soon renamed Calthorpe F.C. after the location of its matches (Calthorpe Park), had to hold matches between club members given the lack of opposition. On 12 November 1873, the Birmingham Post published a letter from "a clerk" - almost certainly Campbell Orr, in his capacity as secretary to the Calthorpe club - stating:

"It has often been matter of much surprise to me, that in a large town like Birmingham there should not be a really good and properly constituted representative football club. As far as I am aware, the only clubs we have here at present are one or two connected with the public schools, and it may be a chance one composed entirely of the young blood of Edgbaston, and, therefore, too exclusive in its membership to allow of its obtaining more thaun a local reputation. These clubs, I believe, play without exception according to the Rugby rules, or a modification of them. I am not going beyond the mark when I state that London has over a hundred football clubs, and the majority of them play according to the association rules; while Manchester, Liverpool, Leeds, Sheffield, and all the large towns – always excepting Birmingham – have clubs connected with [the Football] Association, and able to furnish their respective teams to take part in the annual matches for the challenge cup presented by the association."

=== Administration ===
The evangelism worked as from at least 1874 Calthorpe was playing matches against other sides in the town, and, in 1875, after the formation of a dozen clubs in the town, he and Charles Crump of Stafford Road of Wolverhampton pushed to form the Birmingham Football Association. The Birmingham FA duly set up the Birmingham Senior Cup, which was first played for in 1876–77.

Campbell Orr was the first secretary of the Birmingham FA, a position he held for 2 years, before becoming treasurer; he took the secretaryship once more in 1886, after the previous secretary Joe Cofield died, and held the post until his death, as well as posts on the Football Association committee. Throughout his tenure the chair was held by Crump. The two normally worked in parallel, but one difference between them was in the legalization of professionalism in 1885; Crump was strongly against it, but, despite the Calthorpe stance, Orr was in favour.

The Campbell Orr Shield, played off between members of the Birmingham County Inter-League and Association, and Birmingham & District Works Association, was one of his last innovations in football; he introduced the trophy in October 1921, a month before his death.

=== As a player ===
The Calthorpe club, with strong links with Queen's Park, remained a staunch amateur side, unlike Aston Villa which adopted a hidden professionalism before the 1870s were out. Campbell Orr played for Calthorpe in the first Senior Cup, the club beating Royal in the first round but losing to Wednesbury Town in the second; the club captain was Carson. He did not however play in the club's first FA Cup tie in 1879–80, when Calthorpe was the first side from Birmingham to take part in the competition; he was one of the players who was attending "a great Conservative gathering at Birmingham" instead. Orr would never play in the Cup - his final recorded match had been against Rushall Rovers a couple of weeks before.

His highest profile matches for Calthorpe were in annual friendlies against Queen's Park, although the disparity in status of the teams meant that the Queen's Park XI was a reserve side. Campbell Orr scored the opening goal in the first match in Birmingham, in February 1877 at the Calthorpe ground, but the visitors won 4–3.

As one of the pioneers of association football in Birmingham, he played in the Birmingham FA's first inter-association match, against the Sheffield Football Association at Bramall Lane in January 1876, but the experience of the Sheffield side was far too much for the Birmingham side, the final score being 6–0.

He was considered a good-quality forward, his rugby skills helping in a more physical era when charging between opponents was a more valuable attribute.

== Personal life ==
Campbell Orr's football responsibilities ran alongside his professional life as a director of the firm of J. C. and W. Lord, general merchants based in the Horse Fair in Birmingham.

He married Ellen Marsh in Harborne on Christmas Day 1880. He died on 16 November 1921, as a result of complications from influenza. He left five sons and two daughters; his wife had pre-deceased him in April 1920.
