= Kevin Shoemake =

English footballer

Personal information
- Full name: Kevin Paul Shoemake
- Date of birth: 28 January 1965 (age 61)
- Place of birth: Widford, Essex, England
- Height: 6 ft 2 in (1.88 m)
- Position: Goalkeeper

Senior career*
Years	Team	Apps	(Gls)
1983–1984	Orient	4	(0)
1984	Harlow Town	?	(?)
1984–1985	Chelmsford City	29	(0)
1985–1986	Welling United	?	(?)
1986–1988	Peterborough United	40	(0)
1988–1992	Kettering Town	91	(0)
1992	Redbridge Forest	3	(0)
1992–1994	Rushden & Diamonds	28	(0)
1994–1995	Chelmsford City	21	(0)
1995–1998	Kettering Town	26	(0)
1998–1999	Nuneaton Borough	?	(?)
- * Club domestic league appearances and goals

Kevin Paul Shoemake (born 28 January 1965) is an English former professional footballer who played in the Football League as a goalkeeper.

He is chief executive of the Birmingham FA, UEFA B Licence coach & FA tutor, and Premier League match delegate. He has a full-time career as head of business development at the Chartered Institute of Logistics and Transport in Corby, as well as providing the BBC live-text on match days. He became the chief executive officer of the Northamptonshire FA with effect from 21 February 2011. On 1 June 2018 he became CEO of Birmingham County FA.
