= History of football in England =

== Early football ==
All modern forms of football have roots in the "folk football" of pre-industrial English society.

=== Early references (14th to 18th centuries) ===
The earliest reference to football is in a 1314 decree issued by the Lord Mayor of London, Nicholas de Farndone, on behalf of King Edward II. Originally written in Norman French, a translation of the decree includes: "for as much as there is great noise in the city caused by hustling over large footballs in the fields of the public, from which many evils might arise that God forbid: we command and forbid on behalf of the King, on pain of imprisonment, such game to be used in the city in the future". The earliest known reference to football that was written in English is a 1409 proclamation issued by King Henry IV. It imposed a ban on the levying of money for "foteball". It was specific to London, but it is not clear if payments had been claimed from players or spectators or both. The following year, Henry IV imposed fines of 20 shillings on certain mayors and bailiffs who had allowed football and other "misdemeanours" to occur in their towns. This is the earliest documentary evidence of football being played throughout England.

There is mention of football being played at Cambridge University in 1710. A letter from a certain Dr Bentley to the Bishop of Ely on the subject of university statutes includes a complaint about students being "perfectly at Liberty to be absent from Grace", in order to play football (referred to as "Foot-Ball") or cricket, and not being punished for their conduct as prescribed in the statutes.

=== Nature of folk football ===
More is known about folk football through the 18th and 19th centuries. It was essentially a game for large numbers played over wide distances with goals that were as much as three miles apart, as at Ashbourne. At Whitehaven, the goals were a harbour wall and a wall outside the town. Matches in Derby involved about a thousand players. In all cases, the object of the exercise was to drive a ball of varying size and shape, often a pig's bladder, to a goal. Generally, the ball could be kicked, thrown or carried but it is believed there were some places at which only kicking was allowed. Whatever rules may have been agreed beforehand, there is no doubt at all that folk football was extremely violent, even when relatively well organised. One form of kicking that was common was "shinning", the term for kicking another player's legs, and it was legal even if the ball was hundreds of yards away.

Folk football was essentially rural and matches tended to coincide with country fairs. Change was brought about by industrialisation and the growth of towns as people moved away from the country. The very idea of a game taking several hours over huge areas ran counter to "the discipline, order and organisation necessary for urban capitalism". In 1801, a survey of British sports by Joseph Strutt described football as being "formerly much in vogue among the common people of England". Although Strutt claimed that folk football was in disrepute and was "but little practised", there is no doubt that many games continued well into the nineteenth century before codification took effect.

== Codification (1801 to 1891) ==
=== Promotion by the British Empire ===
In the 1800s, the spread of football began to increase. The British Empire itself was the main driving force behind its diffusion. The British Empire wanted to use football as a means of teaching their values, such as order, discipline, and sophistication. It was also an opportunity to shape men to become workers and join the military, even becoming popular among soldiers and colonial officials. This would eventually lead to the spread of football on a national level, promoting their ideals worldwide.

The birth of football in England was recreation for the higher classes in the country. The British empire had a huge impact on the spread of football not only in the country, but around the world by promoting it. The growth of football in England and the world started with the formation of clubs from local elites in the country. An early example of these aforementioned clubs were Darwen and Turton in Lancashire. Football progressed internationally mainly through education systems that encouraged young men to pursue playing the sport and create their own clubs post graduation. The British Empire's influence on the sport during the 1800s is the reason why some big clubs like AC Milan, Genoa, Grasshoppers, and Young Boys decided on English names despite being in Italy and Switzerland respectively.

Corinthian F.C.'s numerous foreign tours are credited with having popularised football around the world; they were the first club to take the sport outside Europe.

=== Public school football ===
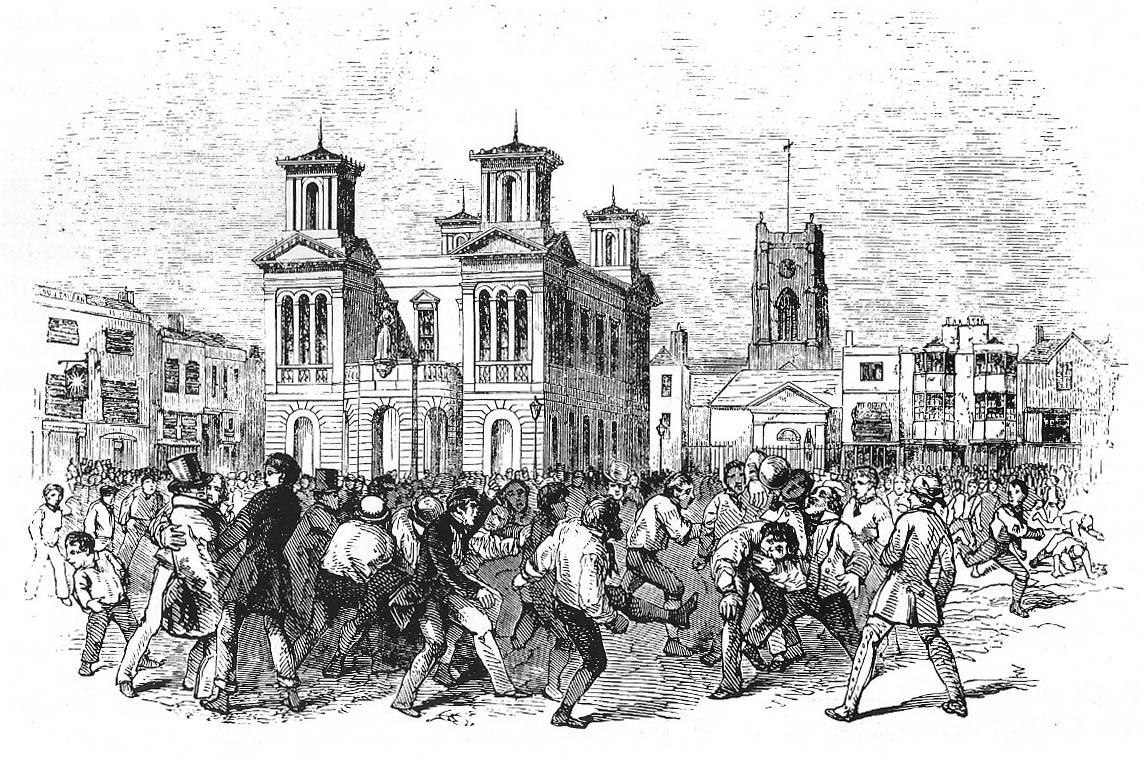
A football game between Thames and Townsend clubs, played at Kingston upon Thames, London, 1846

As the 19th century began, football became increasingly significant in the public schools because it was well suited to the ideals of the "Muscular Christianity" cult. It was, like cricket, perceived to be a "character-building" sport. The trailblazer was Rugby School where the boys began playing the game around 1800, almost certainly inspired by the annual New Year's Eve game played by the people of Rugby, Warwickshire, through the 18th century. The public schools sought to toughen their pupils so that they were fit to rule the British Empire. The policy was in response to widespread belief that past empires had fallen because the ruling class became soft. At Rugby, pupils were encouraged to adopt shinning as a means of toughening up and they renamed the practice "hacking". It became something of an obsession, along with cold showers and punishing cross-country runs (cricket supposedly taught them how to be gentlemen). Hacking was an important issue when the "handling game" split from the dribbling game later in the century.

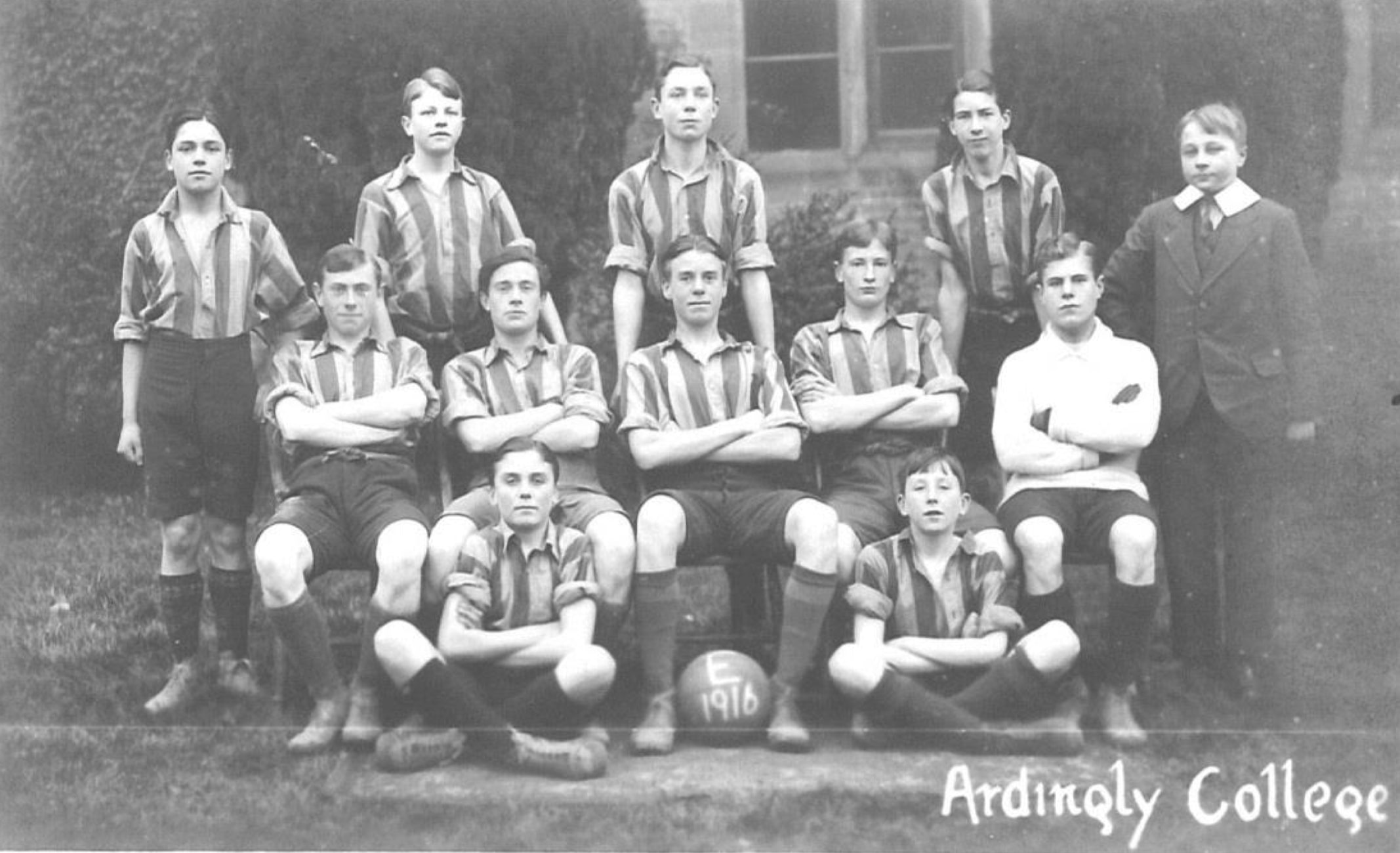
Boys of Ardingly College posing for their football house photo, 1916

By the 1820s, other public schools began to devise their own versions of football, rules of which were verbally agreed and handed down over many years. Each school (e.g., Eton, Harrow and Winchester) had its own variations. Albert Pell, a former Rugby pupil who went to Cambridge University in 1839, began organising football matches there but, because of the different school variations, a compromise set of rules had to be found. By 1843, a set of rules is believed to have been in existence at Eton which allowed handling of the ball to control it, but not running with it in the hand and not passing it by hand. The first known 11–a–side games took place at Eton where the "dribbling game" was popular. The written version of Rugby School Football Rules in 1845 allowed the ball to be carried and passed by hand. The Rugby rules are the earliest that are definitely known to have been written and were a major step in the evolution of Rugby league and Rugby Union.

Eton introduced referees and linesmen, who were at that time called umpires. In 1847, another set of public school rules was created at Harrow which, like Eton, played the "dribbling game". Winchester had yet another version of the game. The original Cambridge University Rules were written in 1848 by students who were still confused by different rules operating at the various schools. This was the first attempt at codifying the rules of association football (i.e., the "dribbling" game) as distinct from rugby football. Unfortunately, no copy of the original Cambridge Rules has survived. The essential difference in the two codes was always that association football did not allow a player to run with the ball in his hands or pass it by hand to a teammate, though players were allowed to touch and control the ball by hand.

=== Sheffield, Cambridge and FA rules ===
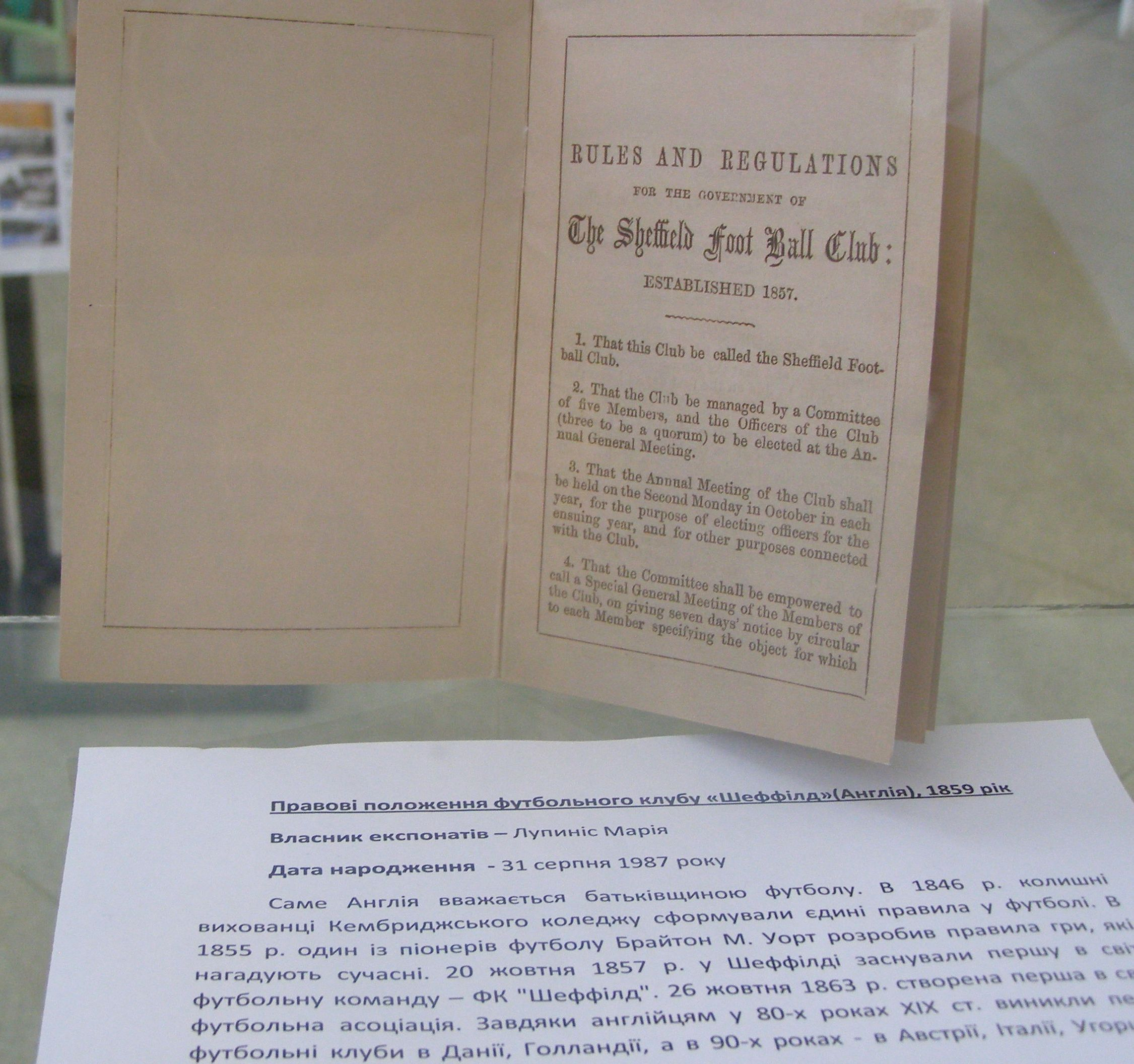
The Sheffield rules were adopted as the official association football rules.

In the winter of 1855–56, players of Sheffield Cricket Club organised informal football matches to help them retain fitness. On 24 October 1857, they formally created Sheffield Football Club which is now recognised as the world's oldest association football club. On 21 October 1858, at the club's first annual general meeting, the club drafted the Sheffield Rules for use in its matches. Hacking was outlawed but the "fair catch" was allowed, providing the player did not hold onto the ball. Just over a year later, in January 1860, the rules were upgraded to outlaw handling. On 26 December 1860, the world's first inter-club match took place when Sheffield defeated newly formed Hallam F.C. at Sandygate Road, Hallam's ground. In 1862, an impromptu team formed in Nottingham is understood to have been the original Notts County, which was formally constituted in December 1864 and is the oldest professional association football club in the world.

In October 1863, a revision of the Cambridge Rules was published. This was shortly before a meeting on Monday, 26 October, of twelve clubs and schools at the Freemasons' Tavern on Great Queen Street in London. Eleven of them agreed to form the Football Association (the FA). Running with the ball in hand was also banned but players could still make the "fair catch" to earn a free kick.

=== Impact of rule changes (1863 to 1891) ===
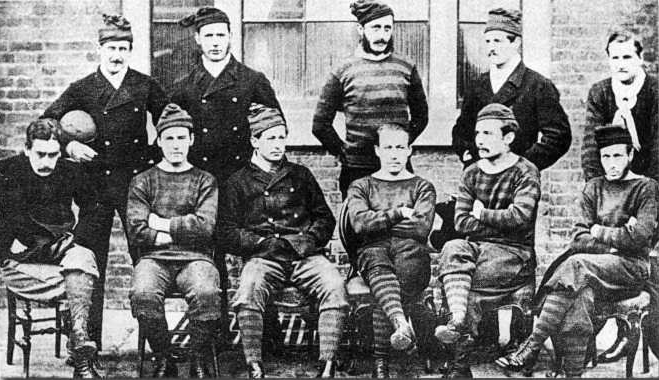
Royal Engineers A.F.C. in 1872: early exponents of the "combination game"

In 1874, Charles W. Alcock coined the term "combination game" for a style of play that was based on teamwork and co-operation, largely achieved by passing the ball instead of dribbling it. Noted early exponents of the style were Royal Engineers A.F.C. (founded in 1863) and Glasgow-based Queen's Park F.C. (founded in 1867).

== Competitive, international and professional football (1871 to 1890) ==
On 20 July 1871, in the offices of The Sportsman newspaper, the FA secretary Charles Alcock proposed to his committee that "it is desirable that a Challenge Cup should be established in connection with the Association for which all clubs belonging to the Association should be invited to compete".

International football began in 1872 when the England national team traveled to Glasgow to play the Scotland national team in the first-ever official international match. It was played on 30 November 1872 at Hamilton Crescent, the West of Scotland Cricket Club's ground in the Partick area of Glasgow. It ended in a 0–0 draw and was watched by 4,000 spectators.

Though English clubs employed professionals, the Scottish Football Association continued to forbid the practice. Consequently, many Scottish players migrated southward. At first the FA put residential restrictions in place to prevent this, but these were abandoned by 1889. Preston North End, the first English team to win the Championship and Cup "double", did so with a majority of their team being made up of Scottish players. In the first season, they went undefeated both in the league and the FA Cup, which led to them being known as "the invincibles."

The wealthy miner Samuel Tyzack, who alongside the shipbuilder Robert Turnbull funded the now professional "team of all talents," often pretended to be a priest while scouting for players in Scotland, as Sunderland's recruitment policy in Scotland enraged many Scottish fans. In fact, the whole Sunderland lineup in the 1895 World Championship was made from entirely Scottish players.

Sunderland's Roker Park was established in 1898 and planned by Archibald Leitch.

== See also ==
- History of the English football league system
- History of the England national football team
- Timeline of English football
