= Calthorpe F.C. =

Defunct football club in England

Calthorpe
- Full name: Calthorpe F.C.
- Founded: 1873
- Dissolved: 1887
- Ground: Bournbrook
- Capacity: 1,000
- Secretary: John Campbell Orr
1877–79, 1880–81 colours	1879–80, 1881–87 colours

Calthorpe was an English association club based in Birmingham. The club was informally founded in October 1873, its first formal meeting being held on 23 November that year. The club's name came from its original home ground at Calthorpe Park.

== Foundation and early history ==
The club was founded by legal clerks in Birmingham, led by two Scotsmen who had recently arrived in Birmingham; John Carson and John Campbell Orr, both from Glasgow, and both of whom had experience in football, Carson with Queen's Park and Campbell Orr (albeit under the rugby union code) at St Andrews University in 1868–70. The club was occasionally referred to as the Birmingham Clerks Association in its first matches. Carson was the club's first chairman and Campbell Orr its first secretary.

In 1870, William McGregor moved to Birmingham, and opened a drapery business on the corner of Brearley Street and Summer Lane on the outskirts of the Jewellery Quarter. Upon his arrival in the English Midlands he became involved with Calthorpe, formed by a fellow Scot, Campbell Orr. McGregor was enthusiastic enough about the game to arrange for his shop to close early on Saturdays to allow him to watch matches, and he later sold football kits at the shop, which became a popular meeting place for football enthusiasts.

Campbell Orr claimed that not only was Calthorpe the first club in Birmingham, but for one season the only association club, and its only matches were between club members. In November 1873, Campbell Orr had a letter published in the local press, following which a number of other clubs were founded in and around the town. Calthorpe's earliest recorded matches against other sides in the town come from 1874. That year, Archie Hunter, already well known as a footballer in Scotland, came to Birmingham for work, and, knowing about the Calthorpe club from its friendly games with Queen's Park, resolved to join. According to Hunter:

one of my fellow-workmen, George Uzzell, mentioned Aston Villa to me as a club that had come rapidly to the fore and asked me to become a member of it. I hesitated for some time, but at last my friend told me that a 'brither Scot', Mr George Ramsay, was the Villa captain, and that decided me.

The explanation does not deal with the Calthorpe club also being run by 'brither Scots'. Calthorpe however was a resolutely amateur club, while one of Hunter's team-mates at Third Lanark was J.J. Lang, considered the first-ever professional footballer.

== Competitive football ==
The club was a founder member of the Birmingham Football Association and Campbell Orr was named its first secretary. The club donated seven guineas to the association to contribute to a trophy for the Birmingham Senior Cup competition. Calthorpe regularly entered the competition, including in the first season, in which it reached the quarter-finals, its best run in the competition. The club gained its record victory (7–0 against Perry Athletic) in a first round replay in the Senior Cup in 1880.

In 1879, the club entered the FA Cup for the first time, and was the first club from Birmingham to play an FA Cup tie, losing 3–1 away to Maidenhead, in a match refereed by Charles Alcock. The club was forced to field reserves, as many of its first team were attending "a great Conservative gathering at Birmingham". The comparative wealth of the club's players was demonstrated when, in 1878–79, the Birmingham FA hosted two charity matches, and only recovered receipts of less than £2. The association appealed to its member clubs to donate; the total amount which clubs donated was £9 8/6, of which over half - £5 10/ - came from Calthorpe alone.

It is perhaps because of the club's wealthy membership that it remained amateur while the rest of the game became professional, and as a result was eclipsed by the other Birmingham and Black Country clubs; Calthorpe never won an FA Cup tie, and none of its players appear to have played for any other club in the competition. Its last FA Cup appearance was a home defeat to Walsall Town in 1883, by a score given as either 9–0 or 8–0, some confusion being caused by a goal for Collington that was "for some unaccountable reason" disallowed. The last records for the club are to matches in the 1886–87 season; the club scratched from its last Birmingham Senior cup entry to Crosswell's Brewery.

== Colours ==
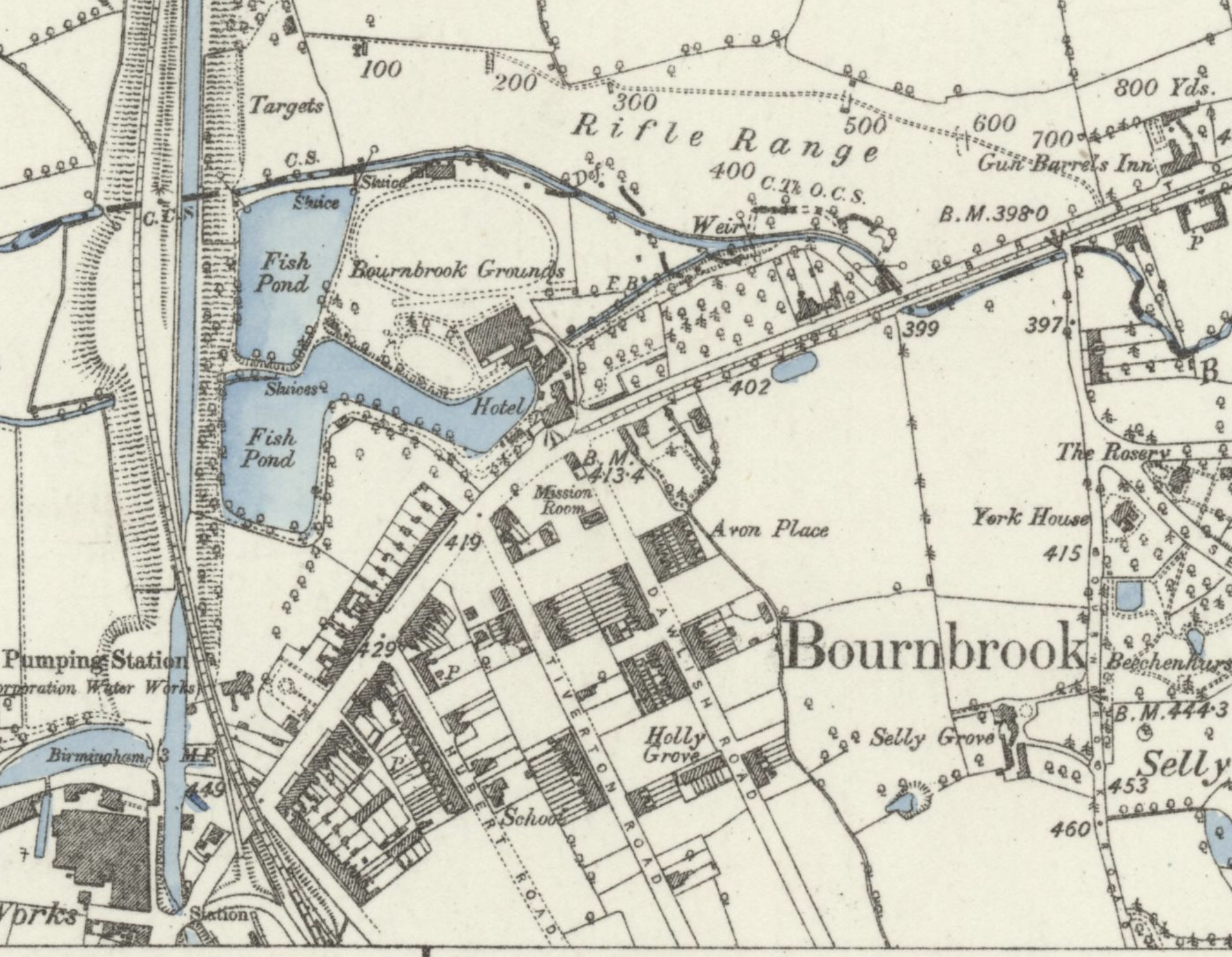
Location of the Bournbrook Grounds, from the Staffordshire Sheet LXXII.SE Ordnance Survey map, 1888

The club's colours changed over time and were influenced by its Scottish links.

Club colours
Year	Colours
1876–77	Dark blue & scarlet with St Andrews cross on breast
1877–79	Dark blue
1879–80	Black & white
1880–81	Dark blue
1881–82	Black & white shirt, blue knickers and stockings

== Ground ==
The club originally played at Calthorpe Park. By 1877, the club had moved to an athletics and cycling stadium at Bournbrook on the Bristol Road, as Lord Calthorpe refused permission to charge admission to Calthorpe Park, and the 3d per match charge at the new ground helped to defray the club's expenses.

The biggest recorded crowd for a Calthorpe home match was 1,000, for a first round Senior Cup tie against West Bromwich Albion in 1881; the well-funded visitors won by a surprisingly narrow 3–2.

== Notable players ==
- Ludford Docker, captain of Derbyshire County Cricket Club
