= Birmingham County Football Association =

Organization

- Abbreviation: BCFA
- Formation: 1875
- Purpose: County Football Association
- Headquarters: Ray Hall Lane
- Location(s): Great Barr Birmingham B43 6JF
- Chief Executive: Kevin Shoemake
- Website: Official Website

Birmingham County Football Association, also simply known as Birmingham County FA or BCFA, is an association football governing body covering the historic county of Warwickshire (including Birmingham) and the Black Country region, England. The county FA arrange 14 county cup competitions at different levels for teams in the West Midland region including the Birmingham Senior Cup which is one of the oldest cup competitions in the world.

The county FA was formed in 1875 and was affiliated with just 10 teams, now there are over 4,800 affiliated teams. It promotes, develops, supports and governs affiliated grassroots football on behalf of the national Football Association and is currently one of only two County FAs who hold the Intermediate level of the Equality Standard for Sport.

== History ==
The Association was formed in 1875 following a request from 10 local teams. Originally called the Birmingham District and Counties Football Association. Charles Crump of Stafford Road F.C., based in Wolverhampton was elected the Association's first president. John Campbell Orr of Calthorpe F.C. was appointed first secretary. Campbell Orr was instrumental in developing the administration and original rules of association football. William McGregor, regarded as the founder of the original Football League and one of the first directors of Aston Villa, also had a strong association with Birmingham County FA.

The Association now has over 1,200 football clubs with 4,800 affiliated teams in over 60 sanctioned leagues, with seven professional clubs under its auspices. There are also teams playing futsal, small-sided football, disability football, women & girls football and youth football. There are over 30,000 volunteers supporting more than 45,000 football fixtures a season officiated by 1,500 registered referees. Indoor and outdoor facilities at its Great Barr headquarters are available for hire.

Birmingham County FA encompasses clubs within Birmingham, the Black Country, Coventry, Warwickshire, Burton, Tamworth plus other parts of Staffordshire and Worcestershire.

== County cup competitions ==
Birmingham County FA organises 14 county cup competitions.

The Birmingham Senior Cup is the longest-serving cup in the county and one of the oldest in the world dating back to 1875/76 season and is currently still being played among the 30 senior clubs within the region.

All of the County Cup finals are either played at BCFA headquarters or semi-professional grounds around the county, while the Birmingham Senior Cup Final is played at the ground of one of the local professional clubs.

== Current competitions ==
Competition	Holders (2018–19)
Birmingham Senior Cup	Leamington
Birmingham Saturday Vase	Tipton Town
Birmingham Midweek Floodlit Cup	Atherstone Town
Birmingham Sunday Youth Cup	Beacon Colts Minor U18
Birmingham Women's County Cup	Coventry United Ladies
Birmingham Girls Cup	Solihull Moors Youth & Junior Girls

== Defunct county competitions ==
Past Birmingham County Cup Competitions
Competition	Year founded	Year dissolved	Last winners	Most crowned team
Birmingham Youth Cup (Sat & Sun)	1963–64	1992–93	Burton Albion	Northfield Town (4)
Birmingham Charity Cup	1990–91	1997–98	Moor Green	Solihull Borough (3)
Campbell Orr Shield	1920–21	1994–95	Birmingham & Dist. A.F.A	
Harrison Shield	1963–64	1994–95	Nuneaton & Dist. Sunday Football League	
Featherstone Cup	1948–49	1987–88	Birmingham & Dist. A.F.A	
Keegan Cup	1963–64	1992–93	Brandish Vauxhall Minor FL	

== Leagues ==
There are over 60 Football Leagues sanctioned by Birmingham County FA which include competitive football in organised Adult, Youth, Mini Soccer, Women & Girls and Disability leagues.

Birmingham County FA encourages and supports all Leagues to gain the FA Charter Standard accreditation.

Birmingham County FA currently has 9 Charter Standard Leagues who are affiliated to the county.

Below is a list of leagues who are currently affiliated with the Birmingham County FA:
(Note: The Leagues highlighted in BOLD are Chartered Standard Leagues; Years in (brackets) denote the founded year of that particular league.)

== Saturday Associations and Leagues ==
- Birmingham & District Football League (1908)
- Burton & District Football Association (1871)
- Coventry Alliance League (1934)
- Stratford Upon Avon Alliance (1896)
- West Midlands Christian League (1979)
- Wolverhampton Football Combination League (1903)

== Minor / Youth Leagues ==
- **Burton Junior League, and Burton Mini Soccer League** (1988)
- Central Warwickshire Youth League (1969)
- **Coventry Minor League & Coventry Minor U8 Mini Soccer League**
- Mid Warwickshire Boys & Mid Warwickshire Junior Football League
- **Nuneaton & Bedworth Minor League** (1969)
- Sandwell Minor (2004)
- **Stourbridge & District Youth League**
- **Tamworth Junior (Saturday & Sunday) League** (1972)

== Sunday Leagues ==
- Beacon Sunday League (1977)
- Burton & District Sunday League (1964)
- Central Warwickshire Over 35's League (1979)
- Coronation Alliance Football League (1948)
- Coronation Football League (1952)
- Coventry & Central Warwickshire League (1967)
- Coventry & District Intermediate Sunday League (1966)
- Coventry & District Premier Sunday League (1966)
- Coventry & District Senior Sunday League (1962)
- Dudley & Cradley Heath League (1910)
- Festival Alliance League (1943)
- Festival League (1951)
- Festival Senior Amateur League (1951)
- Festival Premier League (1951)
- Leamington & Dist Sunday League (1966)
- Nuneaton & District Sunday League (1966)
- Redditch & South Warwickshire Combination (1925)
- Rugby & District Sunday League
- Sandwell District Football League (1954)
- Sandwell Premier Football League (1967)
- Solihull & District Oakbourne Sunday League
- South Birmingham Sunday League & Sunday Premier League (1957)
- Sutton & District Sunday Football League (1966)
- Tamworth & District Sunday League
- Warley Sunday League
- Wolverhampton & District Sunday League (1958)

== Women's Leagues ==
- **Birmingham County Women's League** (2004)
- **West Midlands Regional Women's League**

== Girls Leagues ==
- **Central Warwickshire Girls League** (1999)
- **Stourbridge & District Girls League**
- Midlands Girls Centre of Excellence Fixture Programme

== Other Leagues/Competitions ==
- Birmingham Ability Counts Leagues Adult, Youth, Girls, Wheelchair
- Birmingham Communities League
- Coventry & District Christian League & Cup (1998)
- Midland Police Football League (1926)
- Midlands Universities League (2011)
- Shapla Football League (1993)
- West Midlands Travel League (1904)
- Birmingham Business League (2017)
