= Witton, Birmingham =

Inner city area in Birmingham, England

Coordinates: 52.514°N 1.877°W

Witton shown within West Midlands
(grid reference SP079913)

Witton is an inner city area in Birmingham, England, in the metropolitan county of the West Midlands. It was within the ancient parish of Aston in the Hemlingford hundred of the historic county of Warwickshire. It is known as the home of Aston Villa Football Club at Villa Park.

== History ==
According to William Dugdale, Witton was the property of a man named Staunchel (also spelled Stannachetel) before being seized by William Fitz-Ansculf following the Norman conquest of England. Staunchel became the tenant of Fitz-Ansculf, valued at twenty shillings per annum in the Domesday Book. It was named in the Domesday Book as Witone. It was afterwards vested in the Crown. In 1240, King Henry III granted it to Andrew de Wicton, indicating that the name of the area had changed to Wicton. Andrew grew cautious of William de Pyrie, his neighbour who owned Perry and brought action against him for infringing his property. The dispute was settled by the Sheriffs of Staffordshire and Warwickshire by the King's request.

In 1290 Witton became the property of William Dixley and then the property of Richard de Pyrie in 1340. A route through Witton towards Oscott was mentioned around 1460, crossing the River Tame at 'le Foulford', where Witton Bridge was later built. In 1559, the Earl of Warwick purchased to 80 acres (32 ha) of moor called Wichalmore in Witton.

In 1426 Thomas East of Hay Hall in Yardley sold it to John Bond of Ward End of whose descendants William Booth purchased it in 1620. An heiress of Booth brought it by marriage to Allestree of Yardley. In 1730 Witton contained 22 farms and three cottages, apart from Witton Hall at the north-west end of Brookvale Park. It was bought by John Wyrley son of Peter Birch in the 18th century and then sold by his descendant, George Birch of Hamstead in the 19th century to the Earl of Dartmouth. See Wyrley-Birch in Kingstanding ward.

Historic population of Witton parish
Year	Population figure
1841	157
1851	160
1861	126
1871	217

Witton Hall probably rebuilt by Allestree was in the manor of Witton and it still stands at the junction of Brookvale Road and George Road. By 1850 it was being used as a private school and c. 1907 was acquired by the Aston Board of Guardians as an elderly home. It continued to be such under the Birmingham Corporation in 1959. The buildings have been extended both before and after the Second World War but the original house is represented by a tall, square, three-storey tall block dating from around 1730. Internally, a panelled room and the original staircase have survived.

On 13 June 1902 Birmingham Industrial School opened on Witton Lane. It moved from Penn Street in Deritend, where it was called Penn Street Industrial School. The school had room for 60 boys and opened on 30 January 1869. The new school in Witton had room for 80 boys. It closed on 14 June 1905.

In 1907 All Souls' Church on Wenlock Road was consecrated. It was built using red brick with stone dressings in the Gothic style to a design by Philip Chatwin. When opened, it had a chancel, nave, east and west aisles, and a low central tower with a pyramidal roof. In 1926, a parish was assigned out of Holy Trinity, Birchfield, and St. Peter and St. Paul, Aston. The living was declared a vicarage, in the gift of the Vicar of Holy Trinity, Birchfield, for the first turn only and then of the bishop.

On 28 June 1934 Hugo Hirst was made 1st Baron Hirst, of Witton. He was the only person to have this title, which was made extinct on 22 January 1943 upon Hugo's death.

== Industry ==
Like the rest of Birmingham, Witton was heavily industrialised. The area was the base of industrial company IMI plc. The company was responsible for construction a conveyor next to Witton Brook and dredging the brook in from 1922 to 1929. The conveyor was dismantled in 1943. On 13 November 1929, a waste lime main pipe installed by IMI became dislodged at Lovett's point and slid six to twelve feet downstream. In 2003, IMI moved from the Witton site to new headquarters close to Birmingham Airport.

The General Electric Co. Ltd. (GEC) acquired land at Witton in 1899 and established an engineering works in 1901, together with houses for its workers. By the time of Edward, Prince of Wales visit on 12 June 1923, the factory site extended to 130 acres (53 ha). The main engineering works and administration block fronted Electric Avenue; adjoining were works for switchgear, standard motors, small motors and fans, batteries, moulded insulation and lamp black, and at the rear a foundry producing castings. The main factory made the turbo-alternators for the Nechells A power station. Across the Tame Valley canal were extensive playing fields for employees' sports teams, allotments and the "Magnet" social club with its theatre and dancing hall, billiards room, gymnasium and boxing ring. At one time, the company was employing 18,000 people on the site. By 1927, London Aluminium was employing 400 people at its works in Witton.

== Places of interest ==
Other notable features of Witton are Witton Cemetery, Witton Lakes, the River Tame, the remains of Witton Hall and Witton railway station. The Birmingham Bulldogs rugby team's training ground is also based on Moor Lane in Witton. Witton Centre is the shopping area for Witton, featuring independent traders. Refurbishment of the shops was carried out in the 1980s under the City Council's Inner City Partnership Programme, although by the late 1990s, shops were beginning to show signs of need of further investment. The quality of the environment in Witton is poor with heavy traffic flows, poor parking and servicing arrangements. There are a number of buildings here which reflect the Victorian and Edwardian legacy of Aston, with the Aston Hotel possibly the most well-known local landmark. In some cases, however, the character and architectural quality of these buildings has been disrupted by modern signage and shop front design.

== Flooding ==
On 15 June 2007, parts of Witton were flooded as a result of heavy rainfall causing the River Tame to burst its banks. Residents of 300 homes in the Brookvale Road area were sent advice by the city council on dealing with the clean-up and cost of the floods. Parts of the area were evacuated as a precautionary measure. Residents were encouraged to evacuate to Great Barr Leisure Centre, in Great Barr where Birmingham City Council was staffing a rest centre. The majority of people chose to remain at home. Roads affected were Brookvale Road, Tame Road, Deykin Avenue and Brantley Road. The river threatened to flood for a second time when the water level rose to within eight inches (200 mm) of the top of the river bank.
