= Church of Our Lady and St Hubert, Warley =

Church of Our Lady and St Hubert
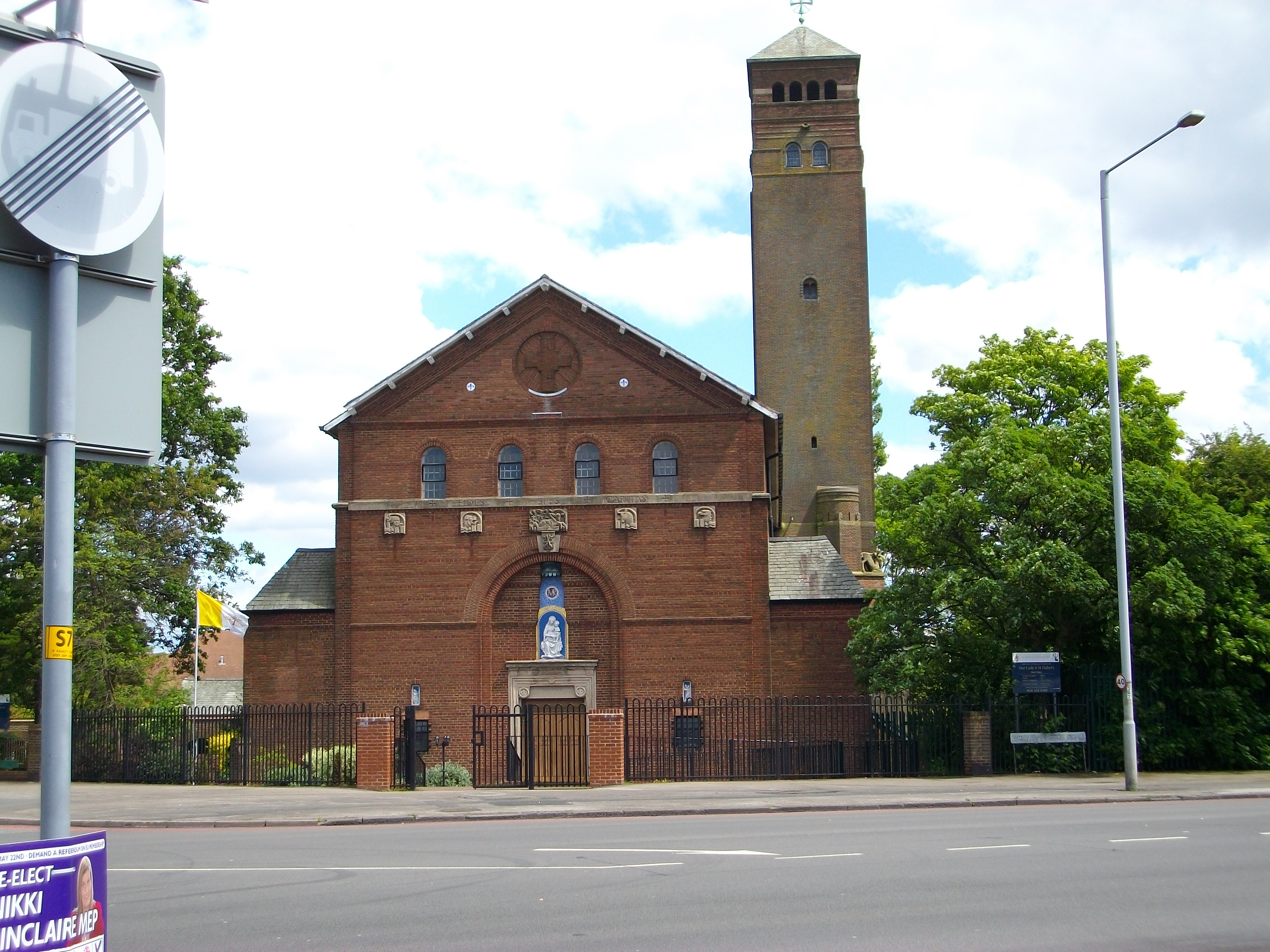
- Viewed from the west
- Church of Our Lady and St Hubert
- 52°28′18.491″N 1°59′50.201″W
- OS grid reference: SP 00282 85985
- Location: Warley, West Midlands
- Country: England
- Denomination: Roman Catholic
- Website: www.sthubertswarley.org.uk

History
- Consecrated: 18 June 1935

Architecture
- Heritage designation: Grade II
- Designated: 26 April 2016
- Architect: George Drysdale
- Style: Early-Christian basilican
- Completed: 1934

Administration
- Diocese: Archdiocese of Birmingham

The Church of Our Lady and St Hubert is a Roman Catholic church in Warley, West Midlands, England, and in the Roman Catholic Archdiocese of Birmingham. It was built in 1934, and is Grade II listed.

== Background ==
The church was built by a bequest of Major Howard Galton (1854–1928). His ancestor Samuel Galton, a Birmingham gun manufacturer, purchased an estate in Warley and built a house, Warley Abbey, set in landscaped grounds. The house was completed by his son Hubert in 1819. The Galton family later moved away from Warley Abbey, but remained its owners. The grounds eventually became Warley Woods; Warley Abbey was demolished in 1957.

In the mid-19th century the family, who were Quakers, converted to Roman Catholicism, inspired by John Henry Newman, the founder of the Birmingham Oratory. Major Howard Galton, a grandson of Hubert, originally offered a parcel of land at the corner of Park Road and Wigorn Road in Bearwood nearby, but since the diocesan authorities advised that the site was too small, he amended his will so that the proceeds from a sale of land would be used for building the church on a site approved by the trustees.

== Construction ==
The church, situated at the junction of Bleakhouse Road with the A4123 Wolverhampton Road, was designed in Early-Christian basilican style by George Drysdale, a Roman Catholic and senior partner of the London firm Leonard Stokes and Drysdale. It was built in 1934, to seat a congregation of 500. It was opened on 3 November 1934 by Archbishop Thomas Leighton Williams, and was consecrated on 18 June 1935.

== Description ==
The church is built of narrow brown and purple bricks, in English garden-wall bond. The west door is set within a tall round-headed brick arch. Above the doorway is a representation of the Virgin and Child in Della Robbia style; it has a mosaic surround, designed by Hardman & Co. and installed in 1949. Above the arch and below the plat band are stone bas-reliefs in Art Deco style of the Evangelists and, in the centre, the Agnus Dei. Above the plat band are four windows with round arches.

The campanile, in the south-east corner of the building, has a tall white cross on two of its faces. Near the base of the campanile is a stone sculpture of a kneeling stag with the crucifix between its antlers, the symbol of St Hubert.

The narthex, into which the west door leads, has a panelled organ gallery above, and is separated from the nave by a screen which has five glazed archways. At the sides of the nave are arcades of four bays with wide semi-circular arches; above them are round-arched clerestory windows. Behind the stone altar is a tall stone reredos with a timber canopy.

== See also ==
- Church of Our Lady of Good Counsel and St Gregory the Great, Bearwood
