= Margaret Nimmo =

British headmistress (1850–1938)

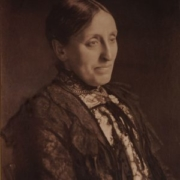
- Born: 20 October 1850; South Hackney, London, England
- Died: 7 April 1938 (aged 87)
- Education: Bedford College and University College, London
- Occupation: head teacher
- Known for: information, Rote learning and competition
- Successor: Miss Brew

Margaret Jane Nimmo (20 October 1850 – 7 April 1938) was a British headmistress. She was the founding head of the girls' school King Edward VI Handsworth in 1883 and she served until 1915.

== Life ==
Nimmo was born in South Hackney in 1850. She was educated at home until she attended in 1865, Bedford College in London. She travelled and studied and in 1875 she began teaching at Notting Hill High School for Girls, but she left in 1878 as University College London were allowing women to study for a degree. She obtained her "B.A." in 1881. She became second mistress and the first graduate teacher at Blackheath High School in 1880 where she taught maths, classics and chemistry.

When King Edward VI Grammar School for Girls opened in 1883 in Aston, Nimmo was appointed as the new head and the school had 300 girls to educate. Half of the schools scholarshops were given to girls from public elementary schools. Nimmo's educational approaches were information, Rote learning and competition.

Nimmo organised the school moving to Handsworth where it has merged with two others opening again in 1911 in a new building on Rosehill Road. The new school at Handsworth cost £50,000 to build. The architect, P. B. Chatwin, designed a building with a number of specialist areas which included the library and the "playroom" (a whole school common-room).

By 1915 the school rol1 was 460. The school's science and gymnastics facilities were poor but the school sent many on to universities. Nimmo retired in 1915 but she kept in contact with school. She gave a speech at the open day in 1920 which was said to have killed an idea of allowing the King Edward Schools to be administered by the Local Education Authority. She moved to Gerrards Cross and died in 1938.
