= Bearwood, West Midlands =

Coordinates: 52.476°N 1.969°W

Bearwood
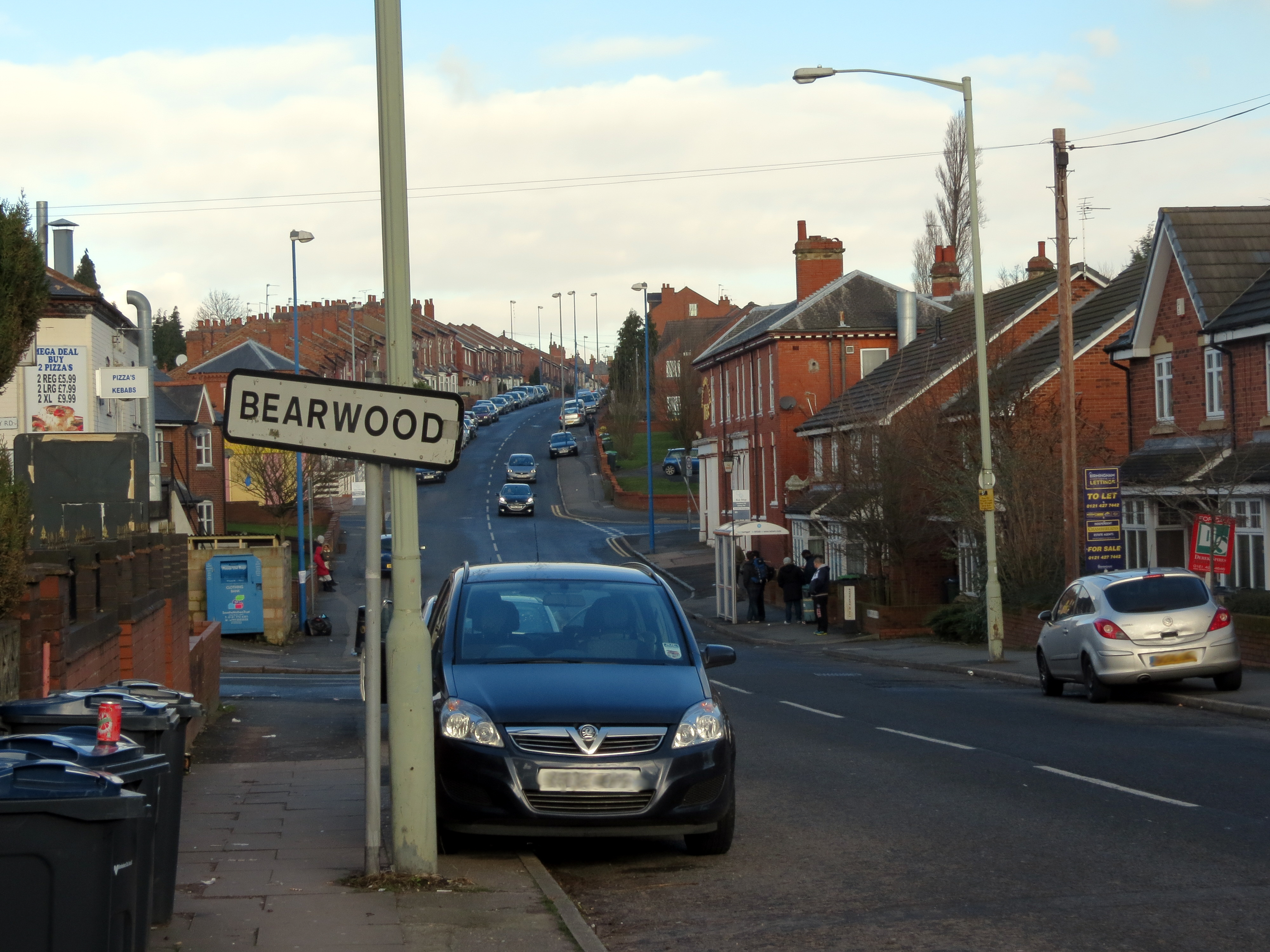
- Bearwood sign on Portland Road looking towards Cape Hill, Smethwick

- Location within the West Midlands
- OS grid reference: SP0287
- Metropolitan borough: Sandwell
- Metropolitan county: West Midlands
- Region: West Midlands
- Country: England
- Sovereign state: United Kingdom
- Post town: Smethwick
- Postcode district: B66, B67
- Dialling code: 0121
- Police: West Midlands
- Fire: West Midlands
- Ambulance: West Midlands
- UK Parliament: Smethwick

Bearwood is the southern part of Smethwick, in the metropolitan borough of Sandwell, West Midlands, England. Historically in the county of Staffordshire, Bearwood lies north of the A456 Hagley Road. Bearwood Hill was the original name of the High Street from Smethwick Council House to Windmill Lane. The border at the Shireland Brook where Portland Road, Edgbaston becomes Shireland Road, Smethwick is signed "Bearwood" as of February 2014.

== Geography ==
The part of Bearwood to the west of Shireland Brook is included in Abbey ward in Sandwell Metropolitan Borough. The smaller part of Bearwood to the east of Shireland Brook is in the North West Edgbaston ward in Birmingham. In 1903, Bearwood ward in Smethwick extended from Hagley Road to Smethwick High Street and included part of Cape Hill.

The Bearwood telephone exchange area marked out by the 0121–429, 420, and 434 numbers extends as far east as Harborne Walkway.

Bearwood, like many areas of the West Midlands conurbation, has a local sense of place, although it has become absorbed into Smethwick. Many locals still use the term "The Bear" especially referring to "The Bear Hotel" located in Bearwood. An old map of the 18th century mentions "The Bear of Smethwick".

Bearwood centres around the Bearwood Road, and the crossroads with Sandon Road and Three Shires Oak Road. Historically, Bearwood extended as far north as Smethwick High Street by Victoria Park east of the Council House. The 1899 Smethwick Borough surveyor's map of Smethwick shows Bearwood Ward as including Cheshire Road from its junction immediately opposite the Council House. Bearwood Hill is the old name for the High Street south of Victoria Park. As of March 2014 the approach to Cape Hill from Birmingham via Portland Road still has a sign saying "Bearwood".

== History ==
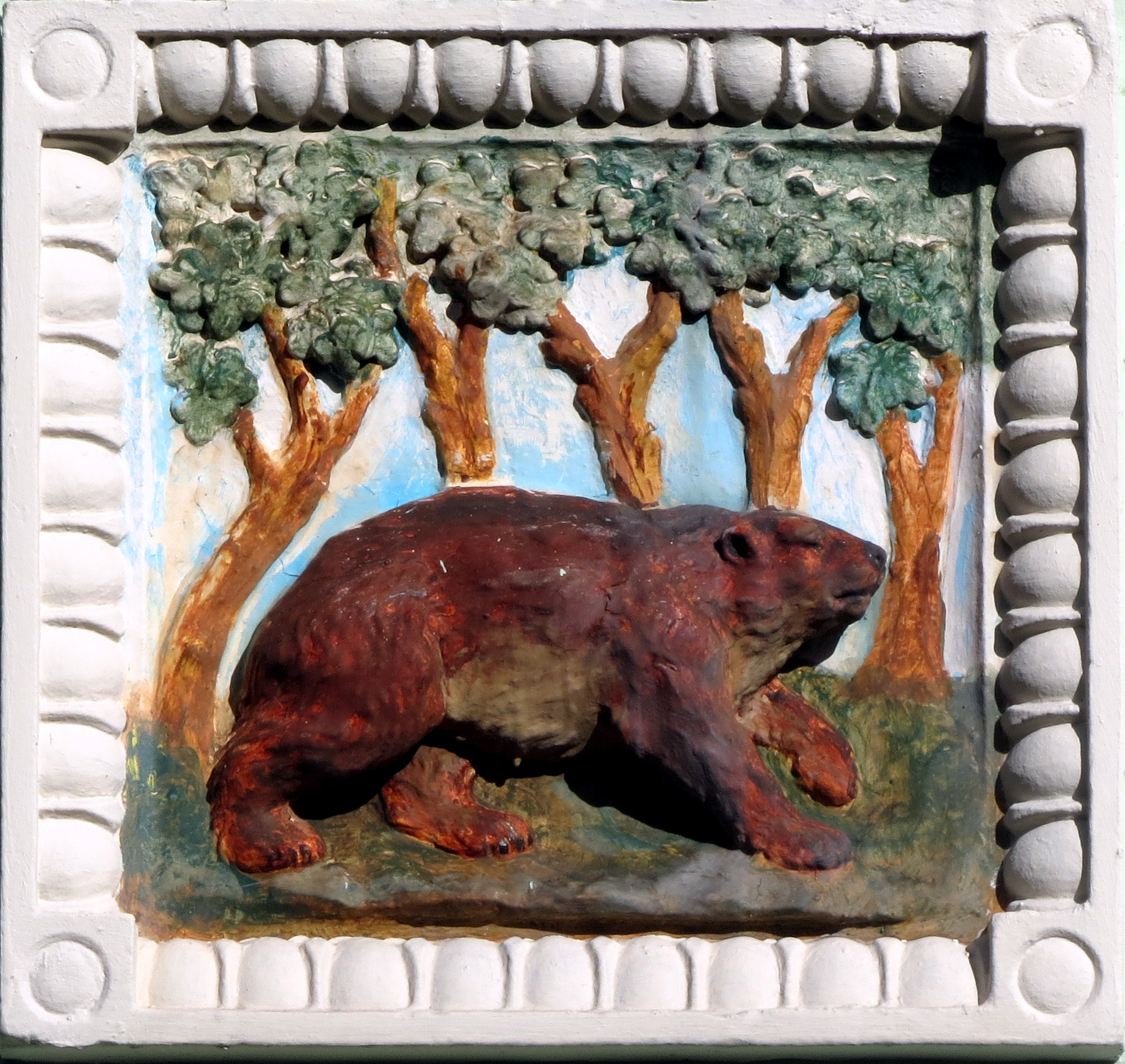
Plaque marking the old border between Smethwick and Birmingham.

The origin of the name is debated, suggestions ranging from simply "Beor's Wood", or the fact that Old English bearu might be translated as "grove", with the implication that this was open woodland used as pasture; wudu simply means a "wood". Certainly there was a wide area of dense forest in the West Midlands in Anglo-Saxon times.

Maps of the Bearwood area up to the mid 19th century show the area as being rural, with farms, mansions such as Lightwoods House, and two small hamlets near the main crossroads. Bearwood Road was an important route linking the growing industrial area of Smethwick with Harborne, Selly Oak and King's Norton, with crossroads at Sandon Road (site of The Bear Tavern) and Hagley Road (site of The King's Head). From about 1880, there was quite rapid growth with a mixture of "ribbon development" and planned streets. This development ignored the county boundaries, and covered the Staffordshire central section along Bearwood Road, and spread into Warwickshire (eastwards), a discontiguous part of Shropshire (north-westwards) and Worcestershire (south-westwards). By 1903, the entire area of Bearwood between Barnsley Road and Wigorn Road, north of Adkins Lane, and as far north as Rawlings Road (marked by the Baptist Chapel) had been developed in an orderly manner.

Also by 1903, most of the northern section of Bearwood Ward had also been developed. The north-east part included the M&B Brewery, and a substantial housing estate for the brewery workers. In 1903, Beakes Farm retained open country from Rawlings Road to Waterloo Road. The older terraces in Willow Avenue, Poplar Avenue and Dorset Road had also been built.

The early 20th century before World War I was marked by a number of ornate landmark buildings. One example is the 1908 structure opposite The Bear Tavern on the corner of Sandon Road and Bearwood Road. Built in 1907 for the Co-operative Society, this imposing building with terracotta ornaments is now divided into a number of separate shops.

The Merrivale Road housing estate south of Hadley Stadium was built from 1905 to 1908.

Some of the Birmingham conurbation's older properties can be found in the roads adjoining Bearwood Road. A traditionally upper working class area of Victorian terraced houses, this has more recently become much sought after, as house prices in neighbouring areas such as Harborne have moved out of the range of first time buyers.

During the 1918 general election, Bearwood came close to having two women MPs from amongst the first 17 to stand at the first opportunity, following changes in the election law. The boundary between the Stourbridge constituency and the Smethwick constituency roughly ran along what are now known as Wigorn Road and Thimblemill Road. In Stourbridge, Mary Macarthur was the Labour candidate, and in Smethwick, Christabel Pankhurst fought as a Women's Party candidate on behalf of the coalition. Both lost, but had they won, Bearwood would have been the first community in the country, possibly the world, to be represented at parliamentary level by two women.

In 1967 Bearwood Primary School appointed Tony O'Connor as head teacher. He was the first Black head teacher in the UK having been born in Jamaica and came to Britain with the RAF in 1943. The day after the announcement of his appointment racist slogans and swastikas were daubed around the school. O'Connor was well liked by both parents and children and retired in 1983. Local historian David Hallam is currently researching his life.

== Governance ==
Bearwood is in Abbey ward for elections to Sandwell borough council.

== Economy ==
Until the main era of house building in the 20th century, the main industry was agriculture. By 1903, Beakes Farm between Rawlings Road and Hadley Stadium was the last farm. Bearwood has had very little manufacturing industry, the most important being the William Mitchell Pens factory at the northern end of Bearwood Road.

The main commercial activity is shops and other service sector businesses.

== Culture ==
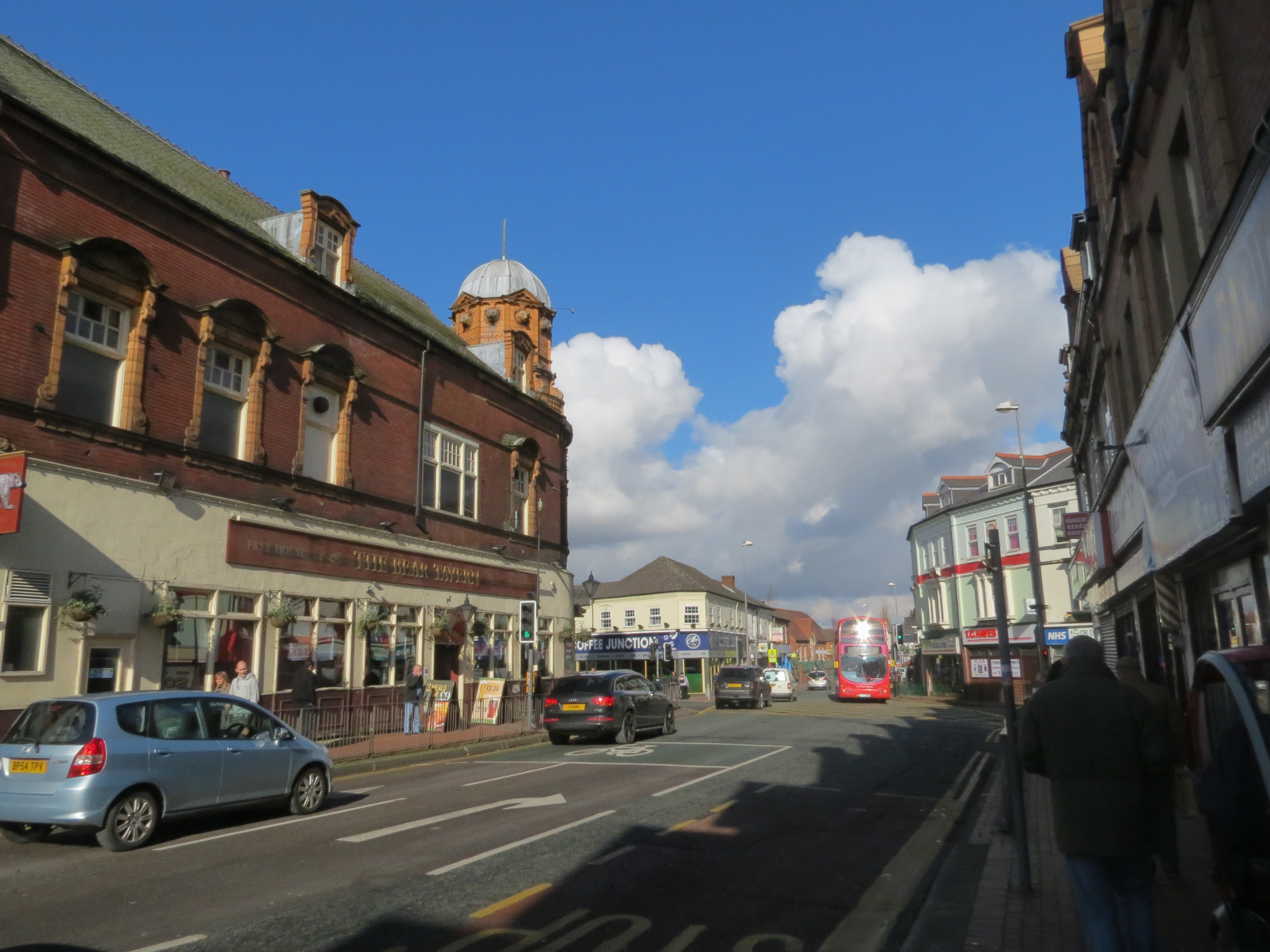
Bearwood Road by The Bear

Local pub The Bear Tavern (The Bear Hotel) hosted comedy nights in the 1980s hosted by local comedian Frank Skinner (then performing as Chris Collins) and many television comedians appeared there, including Sean Hughes, Ed Byrne and some of the cast of The Fast Show. It now stages a monthly clubnight, Club Mojo, and hosts an annual charity Music festival entitled Bearwoodstock. Thin Lizzy played there New Year's Eve 1970 and Judas Priest in April 1971. The Beatles, among many other notable bands, played at Thimblemill baths in the 1960s. "The Midland", a real ale pub, opened in July 2014 at the site of the old Midland Bank, and a Craft Inn opened on the Bearwood Road in 2019. Further along the Hagley Road is the Dog Inn.

Bearwood's main musical claim to fame lies with Christine Perfect, who grew up in Bearwood and studied sculpture at art college in Birmingham. She joined Fleetwood Mac and married John McVie in 1970 and, as Christine McVie, went on to become one of the outstanding members in the band's long and illustrious career. Keith Law, member of the bands Velvett Fogg and Jardine, lived in Park Road, Bearwood, in the mid-1980s. Other musical claims to fame include the now defunct "Little Nibble" cafe getting a mention on Dexy's Midnight Runners "Don't Stand Me Down" album and local-ish band The Twang rehearsing at the Sandwell Snooker Centre in the town. Actress Julie Walters is from Smethwick and lived in Bishopton Road as a child.

There are many local musicians in the area and until recently there were regular acoustic performances at Atticus Bar, which closed its doors in November 2008. Until his death in 2012 saxophonist Andy Hamilton performed weekly gigs along with his sons and Blue Notes band at the Corks Club on Bearwood High Street.

Since 2015 a theatre group, called The Bearwood Players, was set up by a local resident to raise money for charity. In November 2015 their first production, a version of the traditional pantomime, Cinderella, was performed at the Bearwood Corks Club raising money for BBC Children in Need. A total of just over £3,800 was raised. In July 2016 they performed Hairspray – The Musical, again at the Corks Club and raised £20,000 – again for BBC CiN. Since July 2016 the Bearwood Players have moved venues to the Windsor Theatre Bar on Bearwood Road.

The Bearwood Street Festival launched in 2017 and was reprised in 2019. A multi-venue event, it features three stages, a street food area, a family area with extra provision for SEN children, and a street market. The Festival is organised by local residents through the community group "We are Bearwood".

In 2011 a group of local people began to stage free music events at the bandstand in Lightwoods Park, these events are known as the Bearwood Shuffle and have attracted large crowds with an eclectic mix of local acts both established and unsigned.

== Community facilities ==
Shopping facilities along Bearwood Road include an indoor market, an Aldi supermarket, bakeries and pharmacies. There are several opticians and a NHS dental practice. The Birmingham Outer Circle bus routes (the 11A and the 11C), which link Birmingham's suburbs, have stops here. Bearwood also has a number of restaurants serving a range of different cuisines, including The King's Head, The Bear, Johnathan's in the Park, Mt Nemrut, (Turkish), A La Mexicana, Purnima (formerly Teknaf Cuisine), Haweli (Indian), Vaz (Portuguese), The Why Not Cafe, The Edge (Bus Station) Mi Tierra (South American) and The Old Dresser.

Bearwood Road leads northwards to Smethwick High Street, and at the southern end joins Hagley Road, one of the main arterial routes into Birmingham from the M5 at Junction 3. If the plans for the West Midlands Metro extension along the Hagley Road are realised, Bearwood will also have a tram stop.

=== Parks and green spaces ===
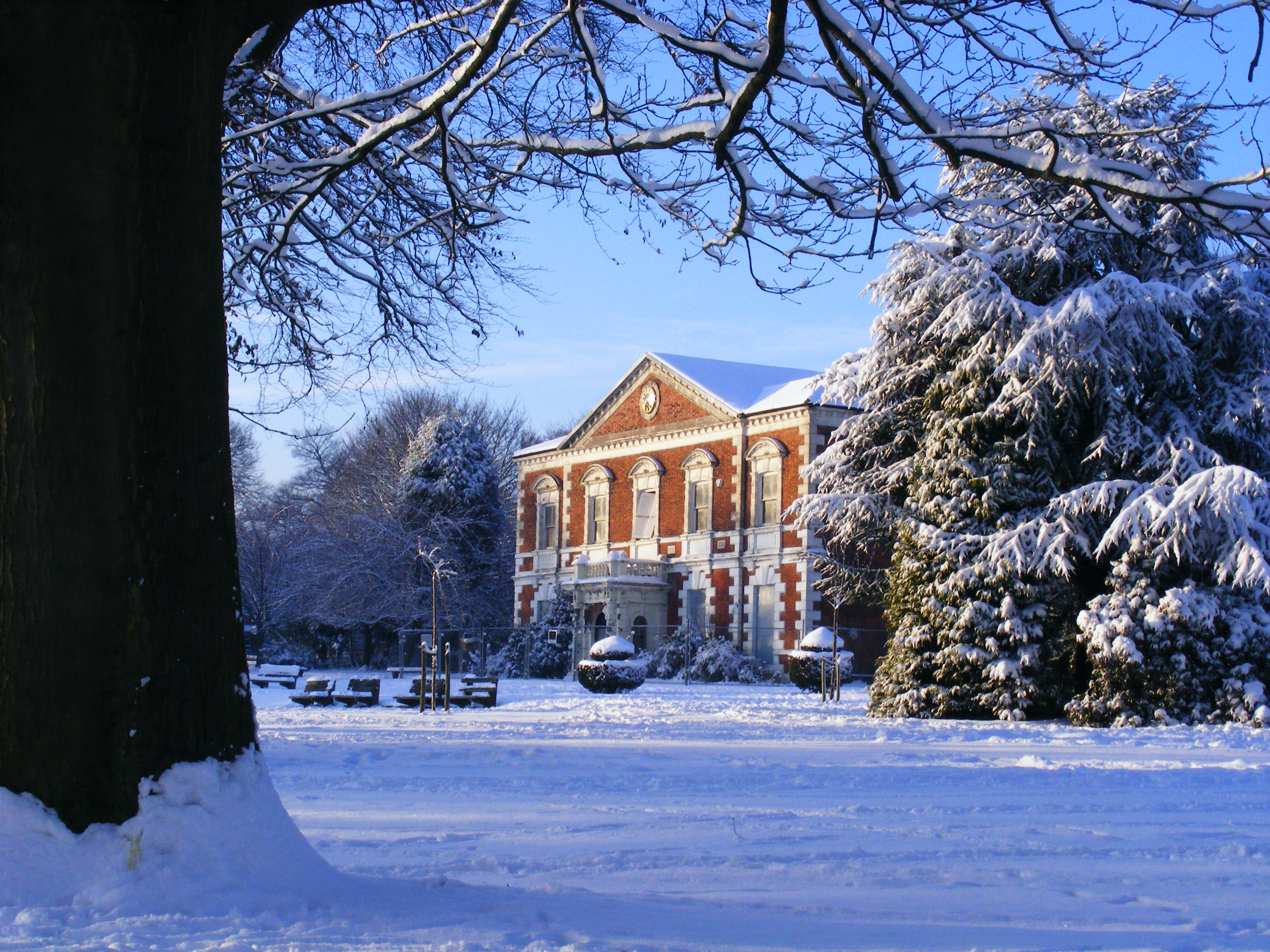
Lightwoods House in winter

Lightwoods Park is located to the west of Bearwood, on the north side of Hagley Road. It consists of Lightwoods House and grounds. In 1902, following the death of Caleb Adkins, the house and grounds were put up for sale, with the risk that it would be demolished for building houses on the estate. A. M. Chance led a committee which by public subscription purchased the estate and handed it over to Birmingham Corporation as a public park. By 1905, further public subscriptions enabled more land to be bought and added to the park.

The bandstand and other features have the Birmingham City crest with the motto, "Birmingham Forward" in recognition of the former ownership of the park by Birmingham City Corporation, although the park itself has never been within the city boundaries.

A prior tenant of Lightwoods House was the Hardman company, which makes stained glass windows. In November 2010, by agreement between the two councils, Lightwoods Park was handed over to Sandwell MBC.

Features include a skateboard ramp and bowling green. "The Shakespeare Garden", a walled garden alongside the house, was planted with every identifiable plant in Shakespeare's plays. The bandstand is a grade II listed building. A drinking fountain also has City of Birmingham inscriptions. The historic Lightwoods House, a grade II listed building, underwent extensive renovation in 2016, and now houses a café and meeting rooms for a range of local activities such as fitness classes, community events such as theatre and concerts, and weddings. On 14 September 2012 it hosted a drive-in screening of Grease, one of the first drive-in movies in the United Kingdom for many years.

Warley Woods is grade II listed on the Register of Historic Parks and Gardens. It covers 100 acres (0.40 km^{2}) and includes a meadow, woodland and a public golf course. Every year Warley Woods hosts a music festival, Picnic in the Park, to promote local bands & artists and to raise funds to maintain the parkland. The woods are run by the Warley Woods Community Trust.

== Landmarks ==
For completeness, landmarks up to the 1899 Bearwood ward boundary, and those associated with the Bearwood area, both on the Birmingham side of the border, and west of Thimblemill Brook, may be included.

=== Northern ===
This section is now thought of as Cape Hill rather than Bearwood, but it was in the original Bearwood ward of Smethwick Borough Council as surveyed in 1889.

- The Edward Cheshire Nurses Home is near the most northerly point of the old Bearwood Ward in the time of the old Smethwick Town Council. It is named after former Smethwick mayor Edward Cheshire.
- The Waterloo pub, on the corner of Waterloo Road and Shireland Road, is an outstanding example of ornate public house architecture. One feature is the sailing ship weather vane.
- The former Lloyds Bank building, situated between Waterloo Road and High Street (originally Bearwood Hill) is a prominent feature on Cape Hill. This was for a number of years used as a Wetherspoons pub, the Sampson Lloyd after the joint founder of Lloyds Bank. As of March 2014 it is for sale. The three storey building is very ornate, and a prime example of early 20th century bank architecture.
- Further north along High Street, and opposite Victoria Park at the junction of Bearwood Road and High Street towards Smethwick Council House, is the former site of The Park Tavern (known as the Park Hotel) and Jee Jee's Indian Restaurant. This former pub is a prominent landmark building.
- The former William Mitchell Pen Factory, now serving as Bearwood Nursing Home, is a landmark building towards the north end of Bearwood Road.
- The Shireland Collegiate Academy, formerly Shireland Secondary School, has a prominent building dating from 1907 on the corner of Waterloo Road and Grange Road.
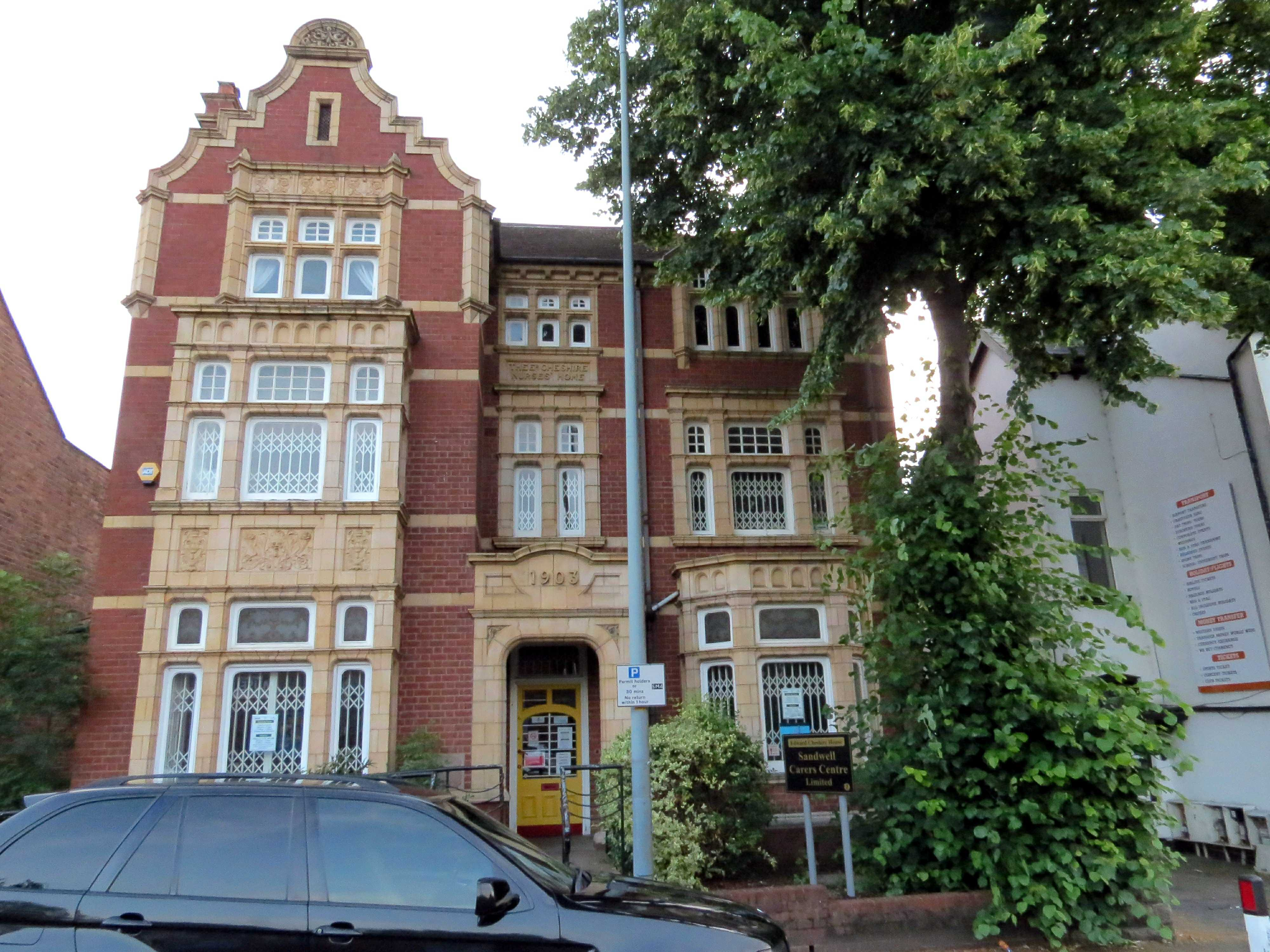
The Edward Cheshire Nurses Home

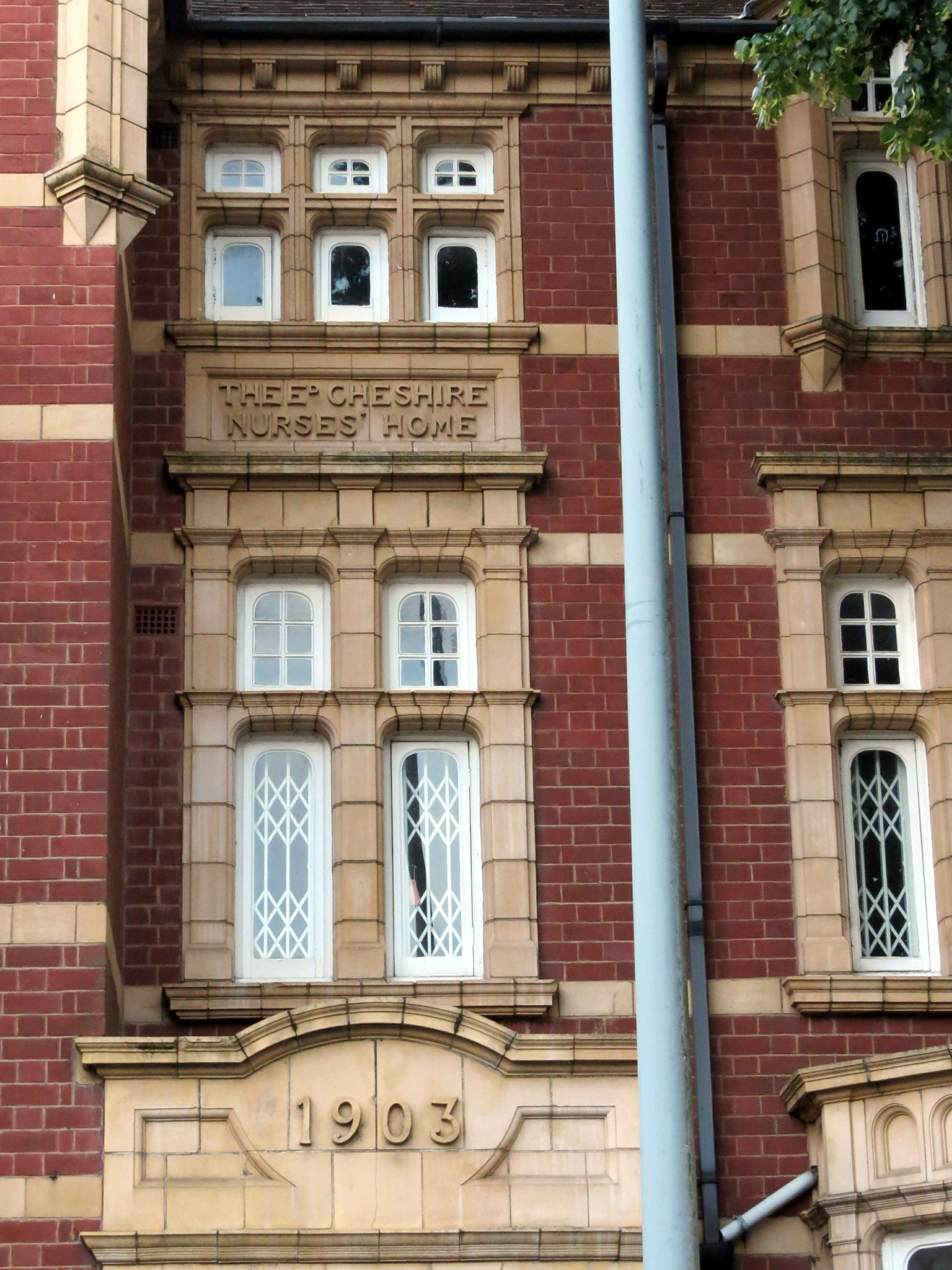
The Edward Cheshire Nurses Home

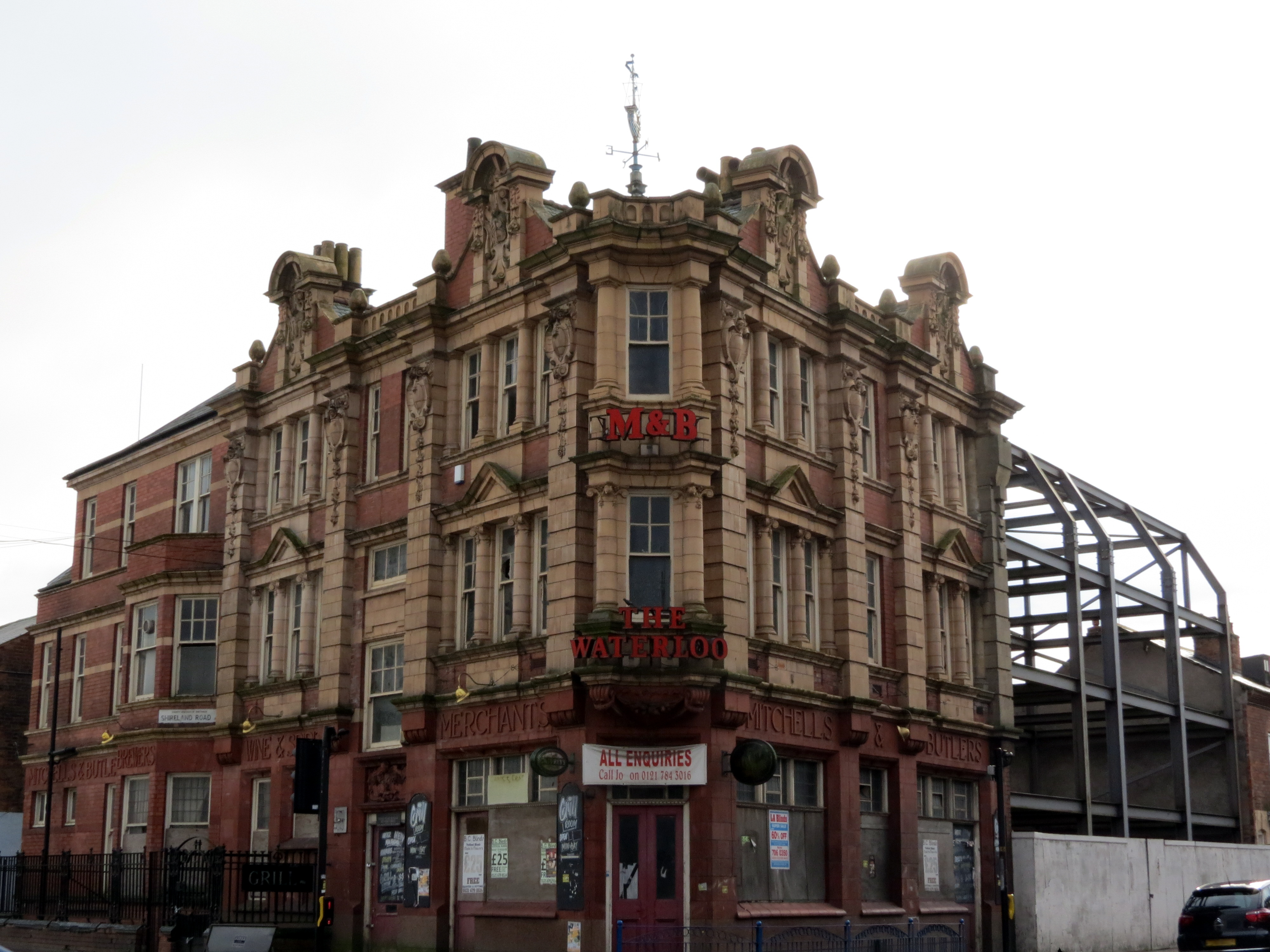
The Waterloo pub

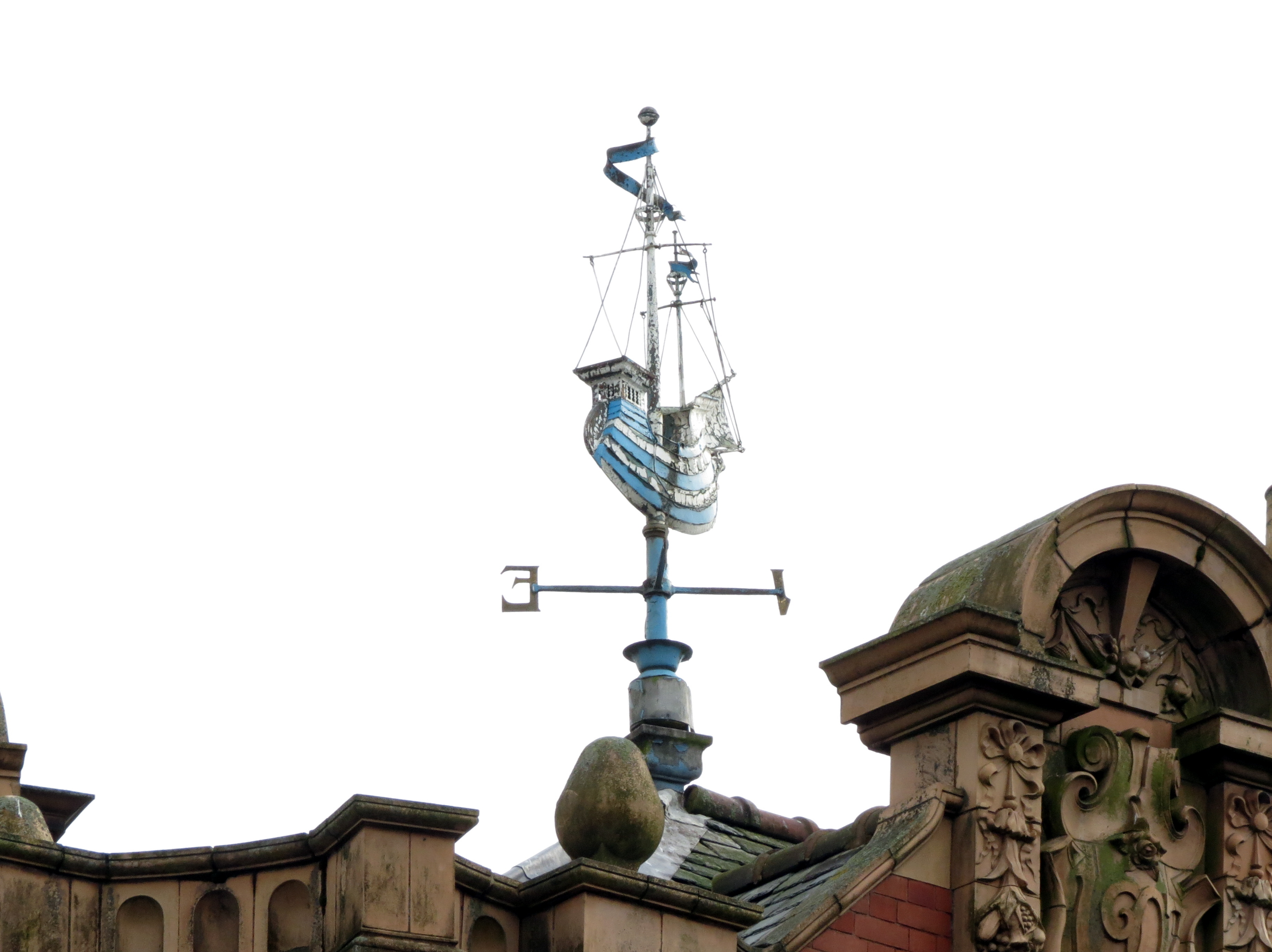
Detail of ship weather vane

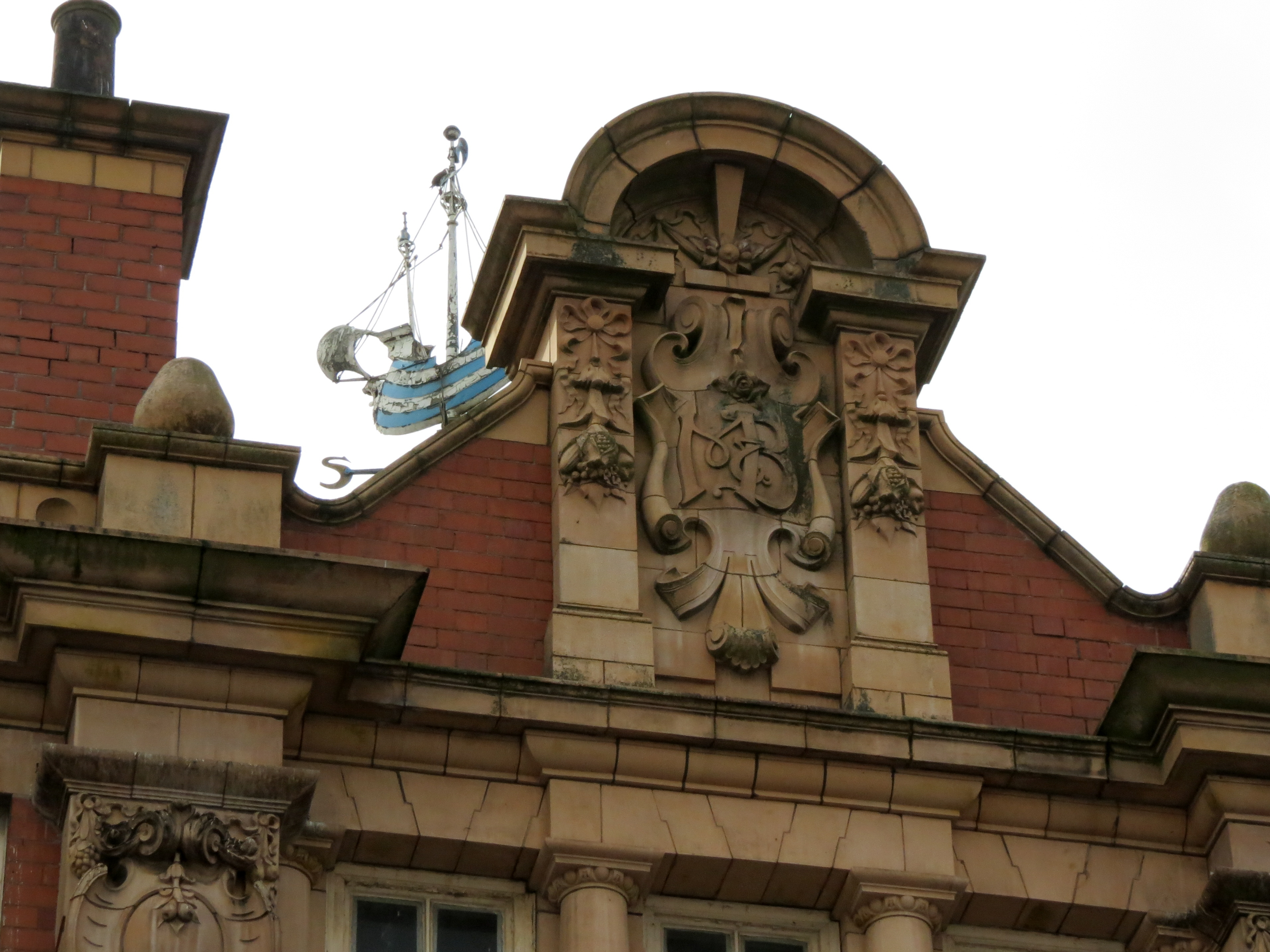
M&B logo

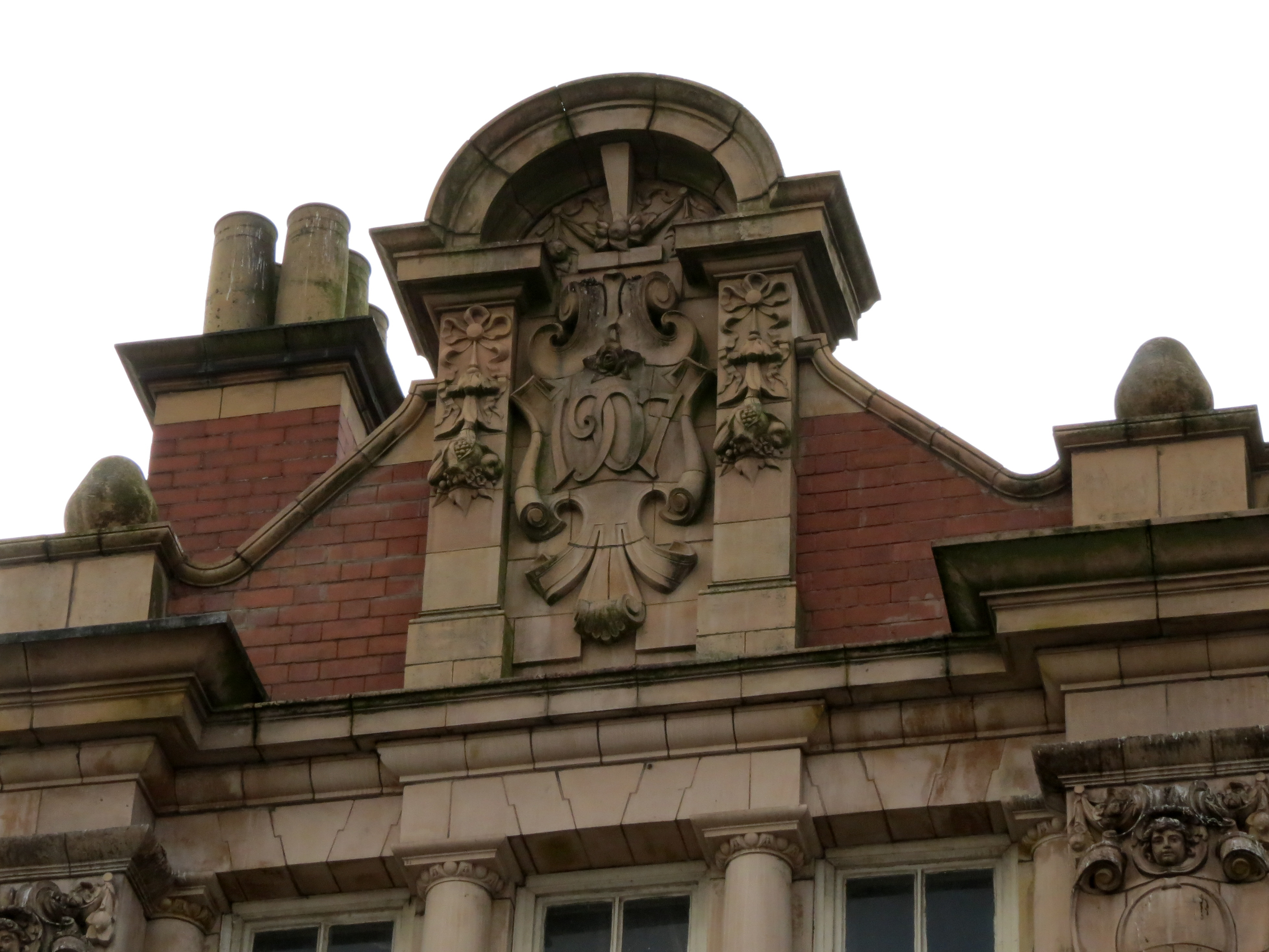
Date 1907

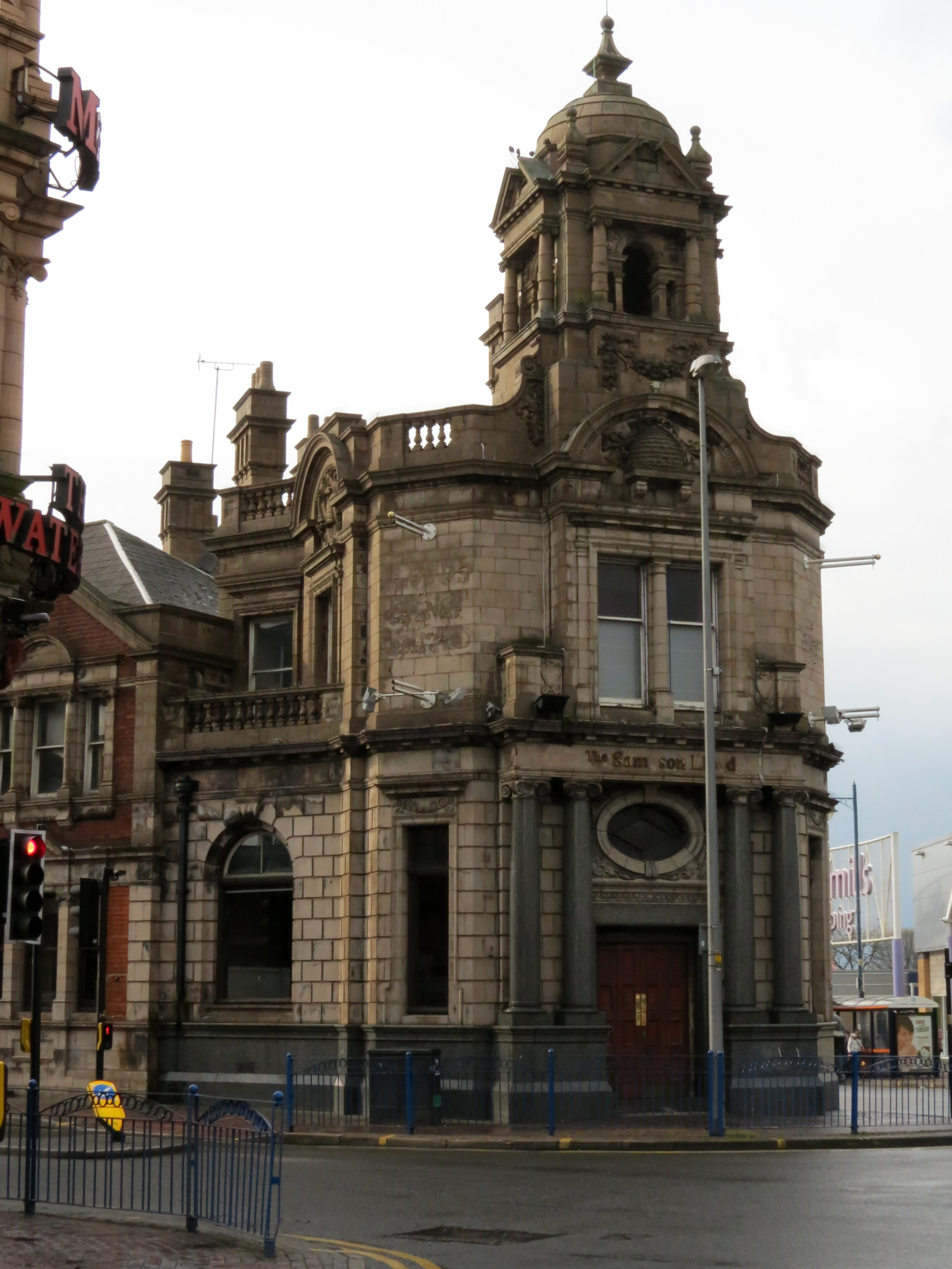
Former LLoyds Bank building

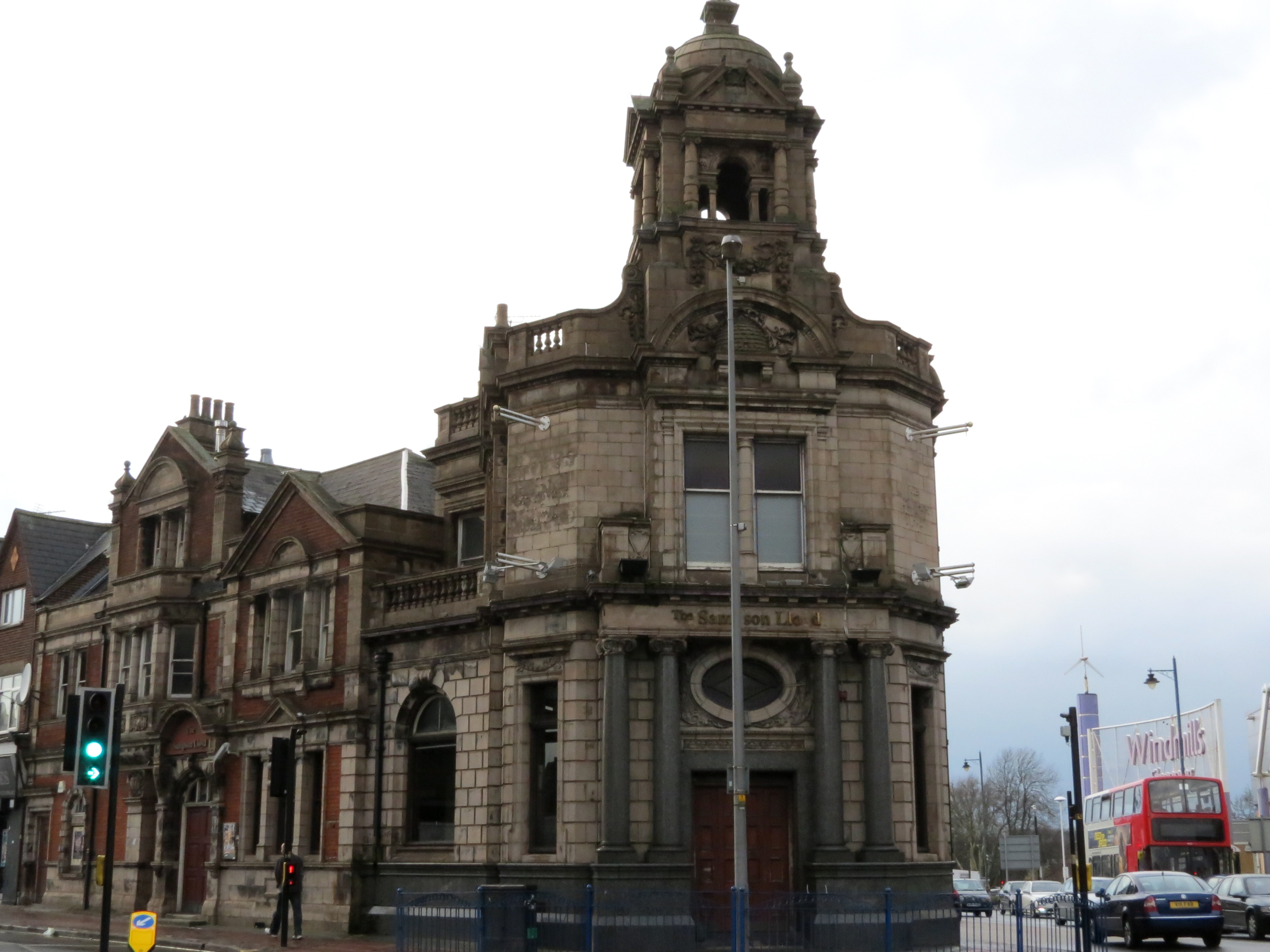
Former LLoyds Bank building

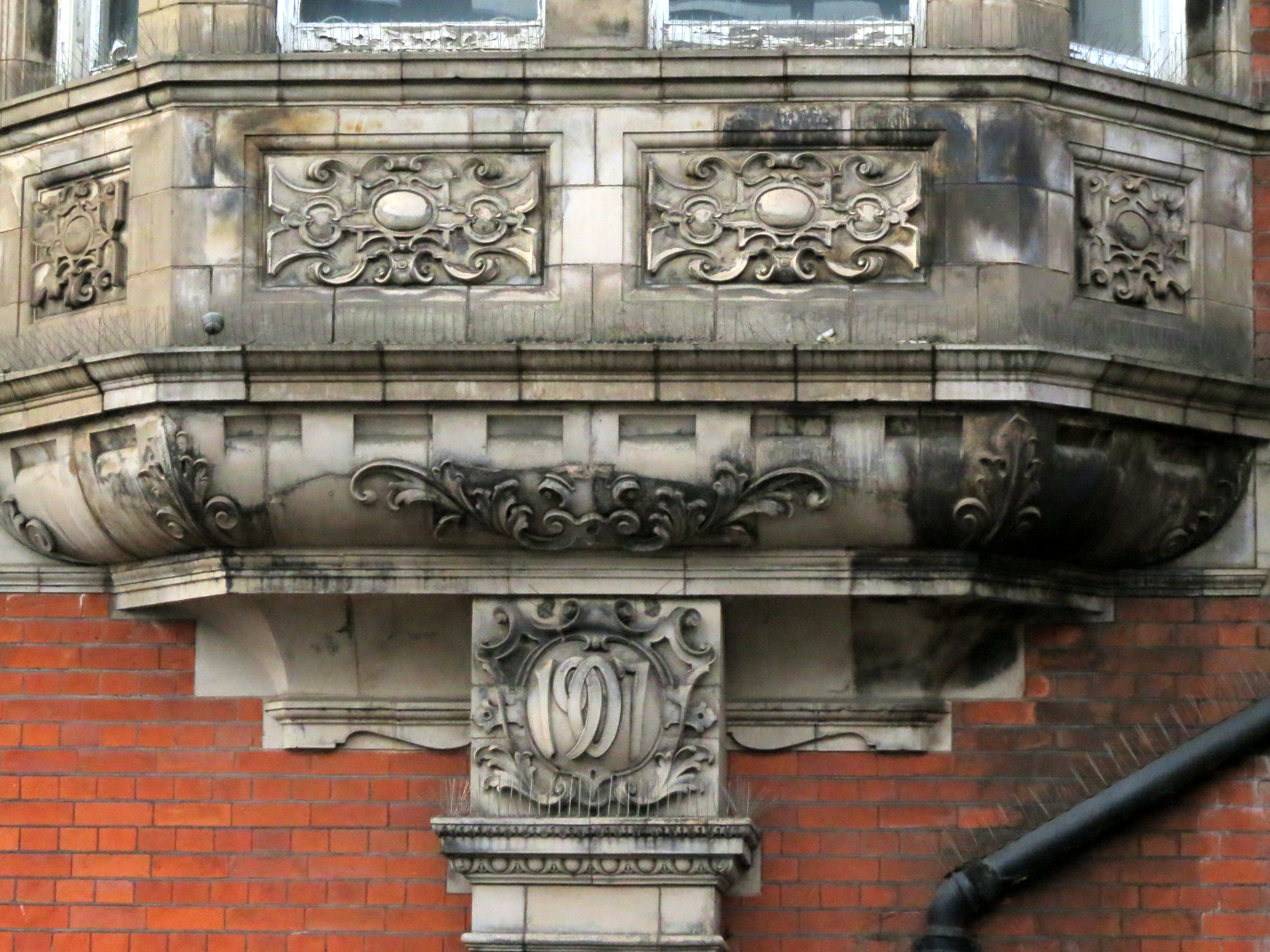
Date 1907 on former Lloyds Bank building

=== Central ===
For convenience, this is taken as the area south of the junction of Waterloo Road and Bearwood Road, to the north side of the junction of Bearwood Road with Sandon Road and Three Shires Oak Road.

- The Barleycorn pub, on Bearwood Road opposite the southern end of Waterloo Road, was a fine example of a brick built Mitchell & Butlers pub. It has now been replaced with the Hadley Hall Banqueting Suite, which no longer retains the brick façade.
- Bearwood Baptist Church
- Bearwood Primary School
- "Causeway", dated 1894, and currently almost entirely occupied by T C Hayes (electrical shop) dominates the north-east corner of the junction of Bearwood Road and Sandon Road.
- Oak Place, on the corner of Three Shires Oak Road and Thimblemill Road, is close to the site of the Three Shires Oak marking the ancient borders of Staffordshire (eastwards), Shropshire (northwards), and Worcestershire (southwards). In the last 20 years, this building has housed an antique shop, a cake shop, and now a Caribbean restaurant and barbers shop. The name Wigorn Road for the southward road from this point is derived from the ancient name for Worcester.
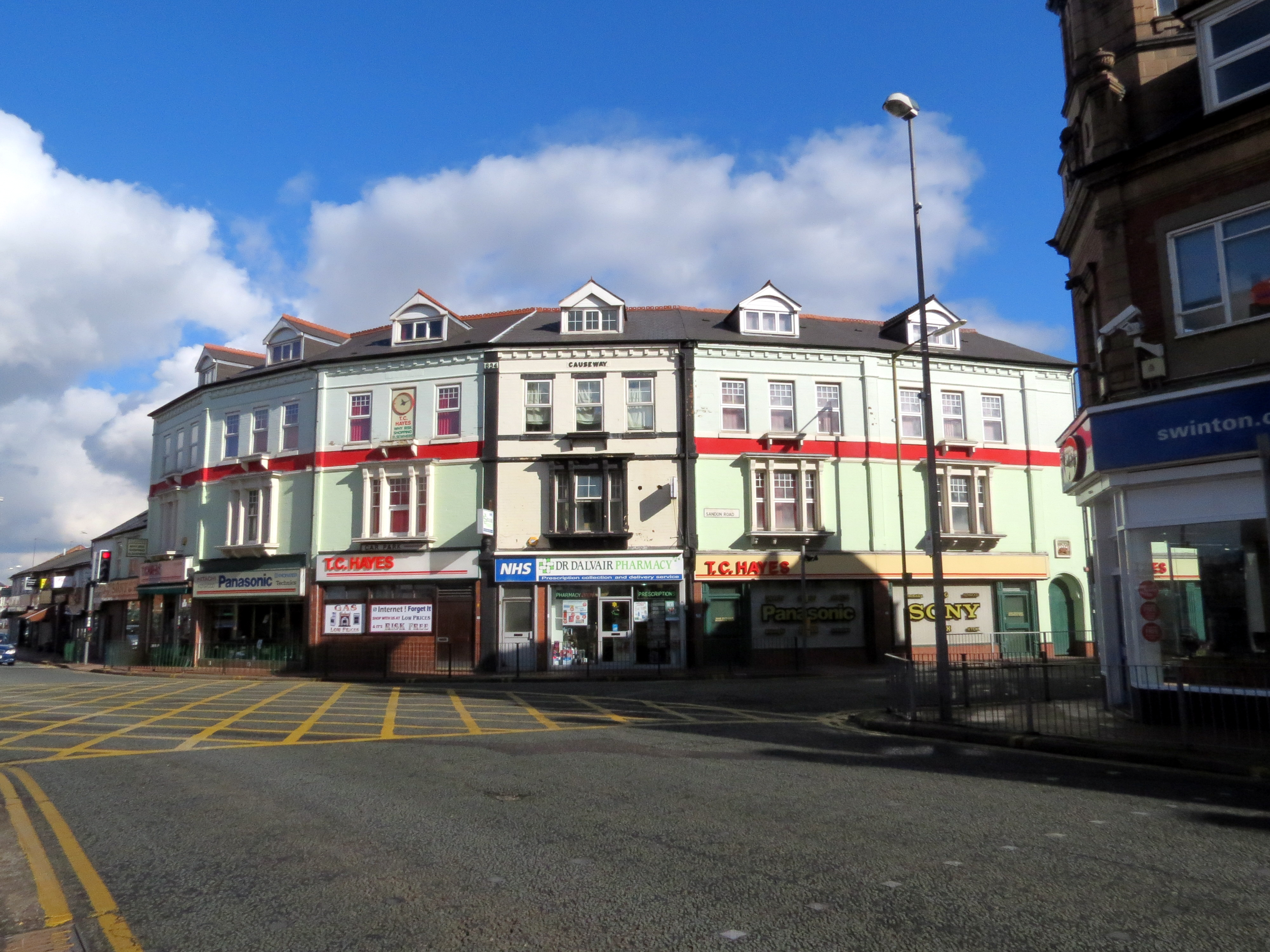
Causeway, 1894.

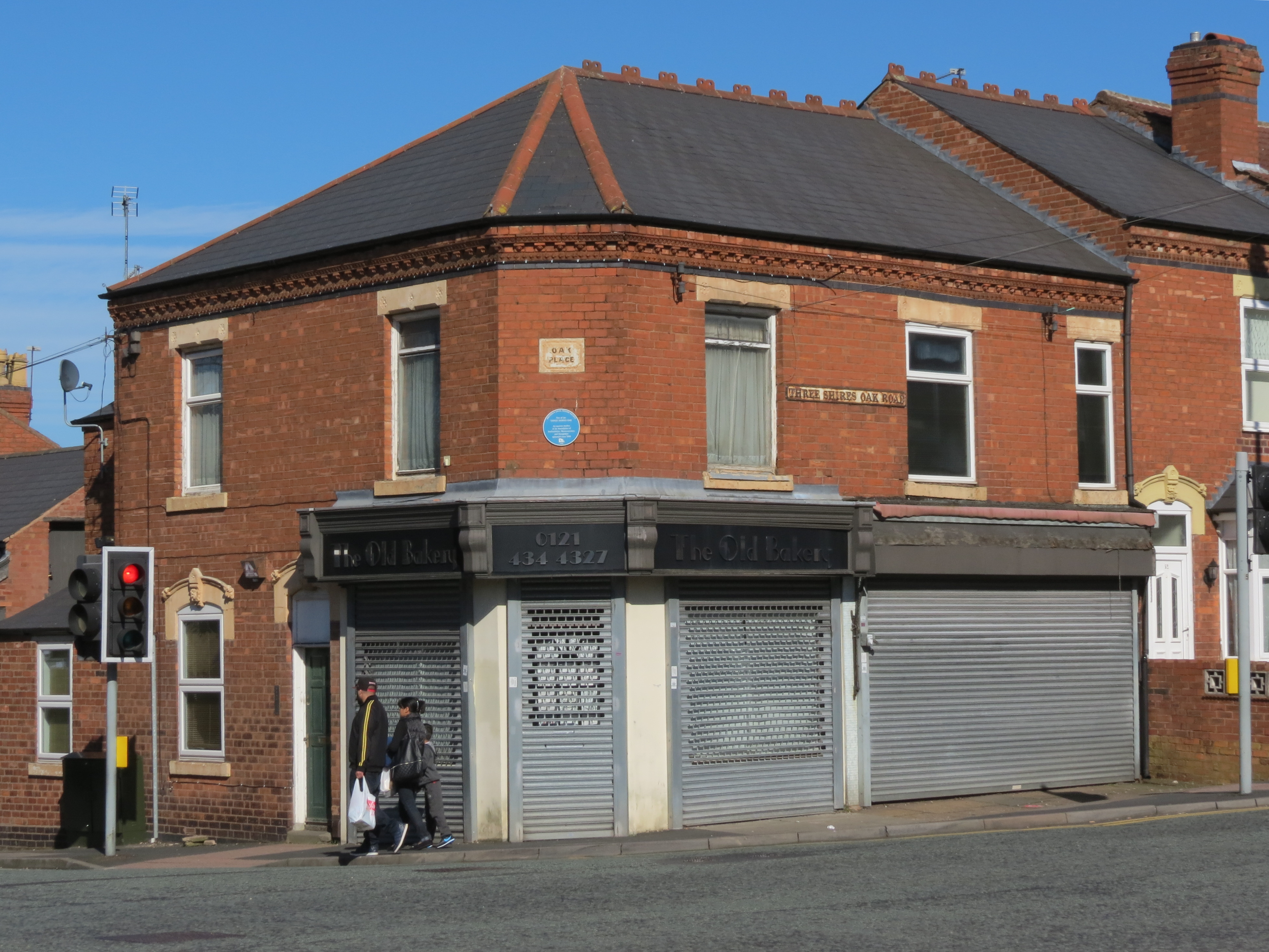
Oak Place

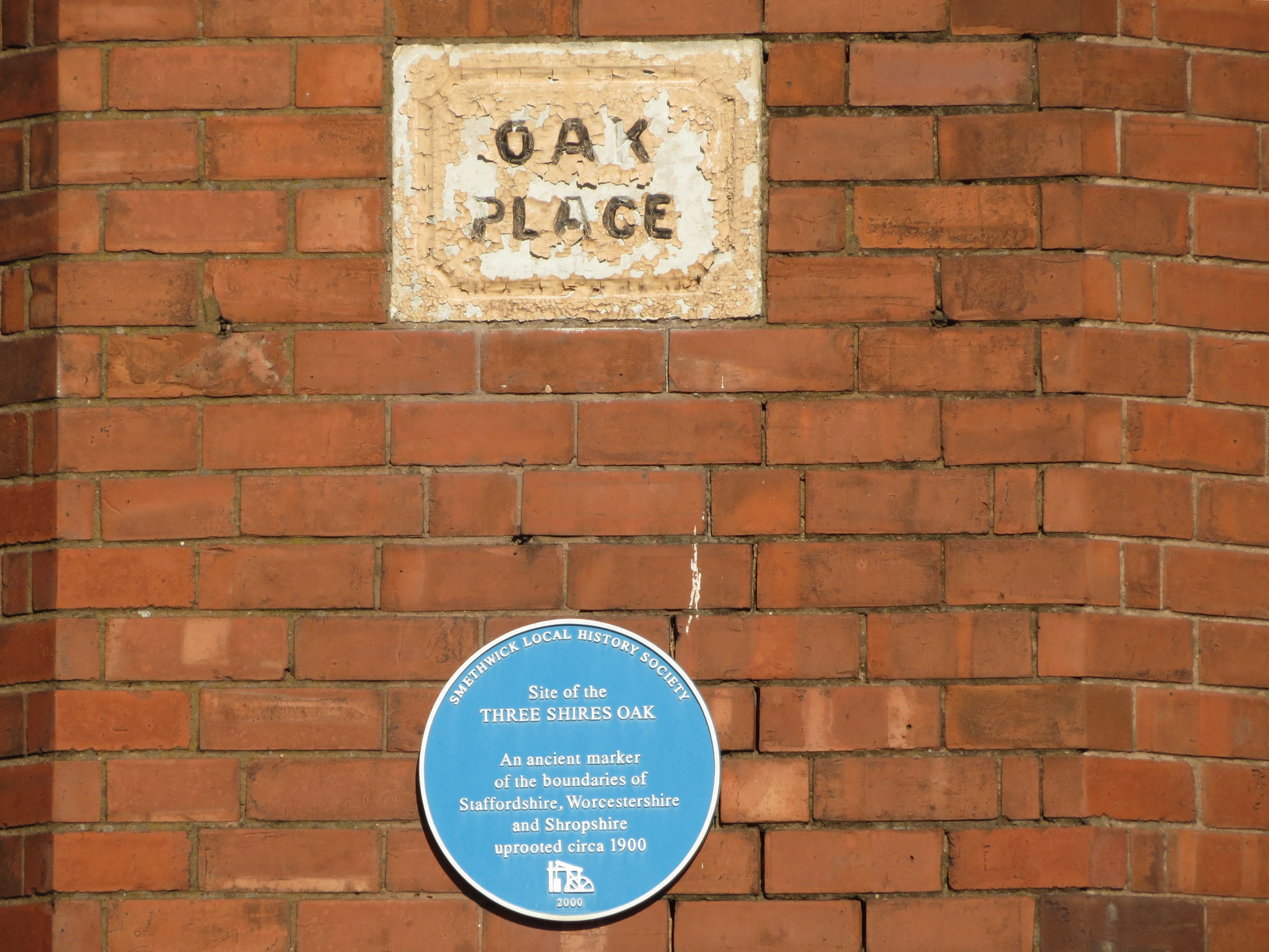
Plaques on Oak Place

=== Southern ===
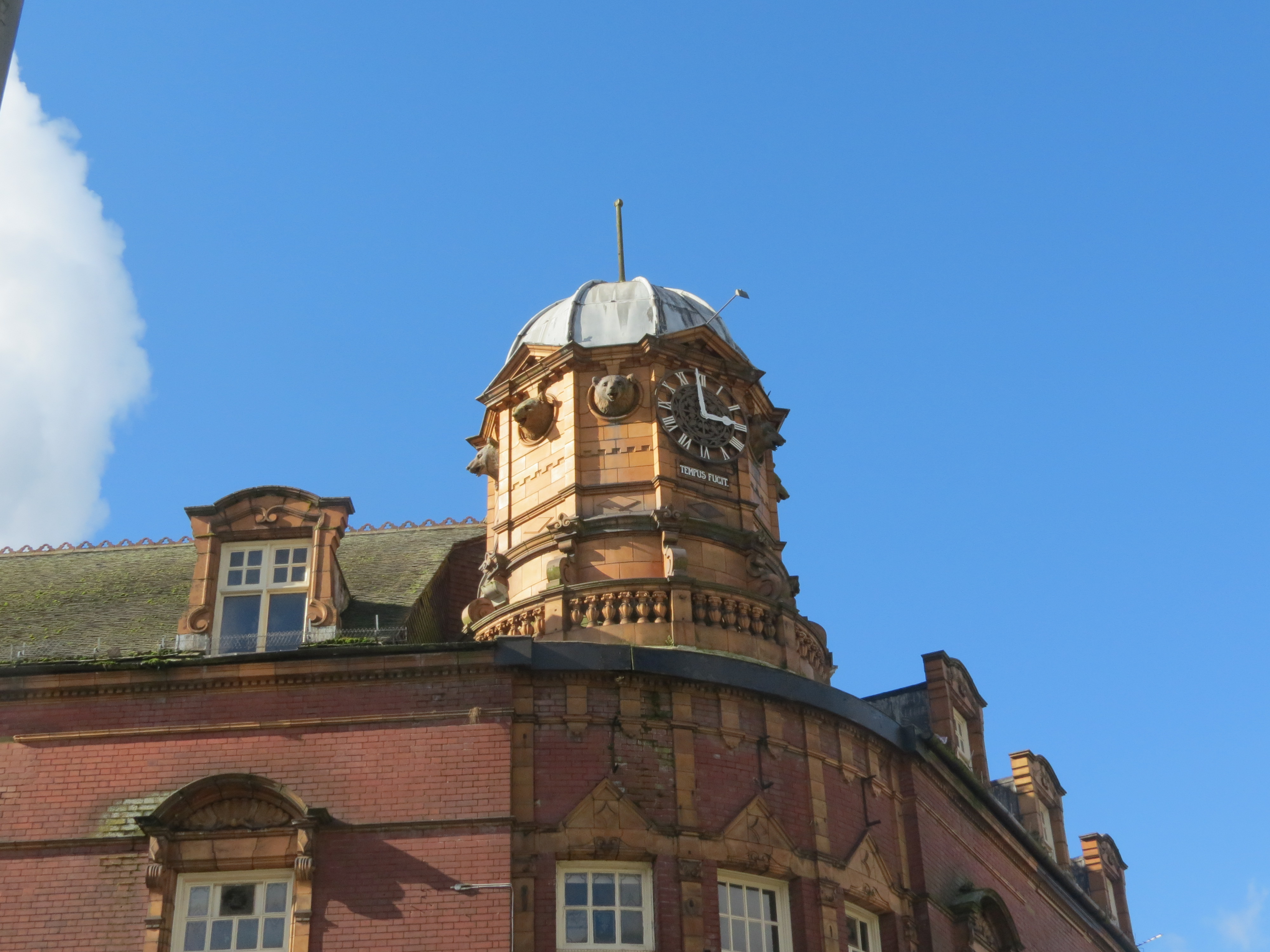
Clock face and ornament on The Bear Tavern

- The Bear Tavern is a major landmark on the corner of Bearwood Road and Three Shire Oak Road.
- Bearwood Telephone Exchange, on Sandon Road by Poplar Road, was on the Birmingham side of the old borders, but is in Smethwick, Sandwell, in the current borders.
- Lightwoods Park and House is the landmark at the south of Bearwood, along with the Wee Magee tree.
- The King's Head pub on the south side of Hagley Road on the corner with Lordswood Road is officially in Harborne, but it has always been regarded as a Bearwood landmark. It is featured as such on the front cover of a modern reprint of the 1903 Ordnance Survey map of Bearwood.

=== Birmingham side ===
Sandon Road has two church buildings which are locally associated with Bearwood.

== Transport ==
Bearwood is well served by major bus routes, with the Bearwood bus station at the crossroads of the Hagley Road and Bearwood Road. Some other bus routes cross the Bearwood Road by The Bear.

Between 1923 and 1973, Bearwood was the headquarters of the Birmingham & Midland Motor Omnibus Company – or "Midland Red" – based at the company's depot in Bearwood Road. Although most of the company's innovative buses were built at its Carlyle Road workshops in nearby Edgbaston, they were all registered at Bearwood and as such carried the Smethwick "HA" prefix on their number plates.

== Schools ==
=== Primary ===
Bearwood Primary School is the main school in Bearwood, located on Bearwood Road on the corner with Ethel Street. Above average size, serving 479 pupils, it is a mixed sex school for children aged 3 to 11 years. In 1967, Tony O'Connor was appointed headmaster at what was then Bearwood Junior and Infants School, becoming the first black headteacher in Britain. St Gregory's Primary School on Park Road, between Abbey Road and St Mary's Road, is a mixed school for children aged 3 to 11. Abbey Infants School and Abbey Junior School lie to the west, overlooking Warley Woods at the junction of Abbey Road and Barclay Road. Lightwoods School is in Clent Road, on the Oldbury border to the west.

At the northern end of the Bearwood area is Shireland Collegiate Academy, on Waterloo Road. On the southern border, in Harborne, Lordswood Boys' School and Lordswood Girls' School take a substantial number of students from the Bearwood area.

== Places of worship ==
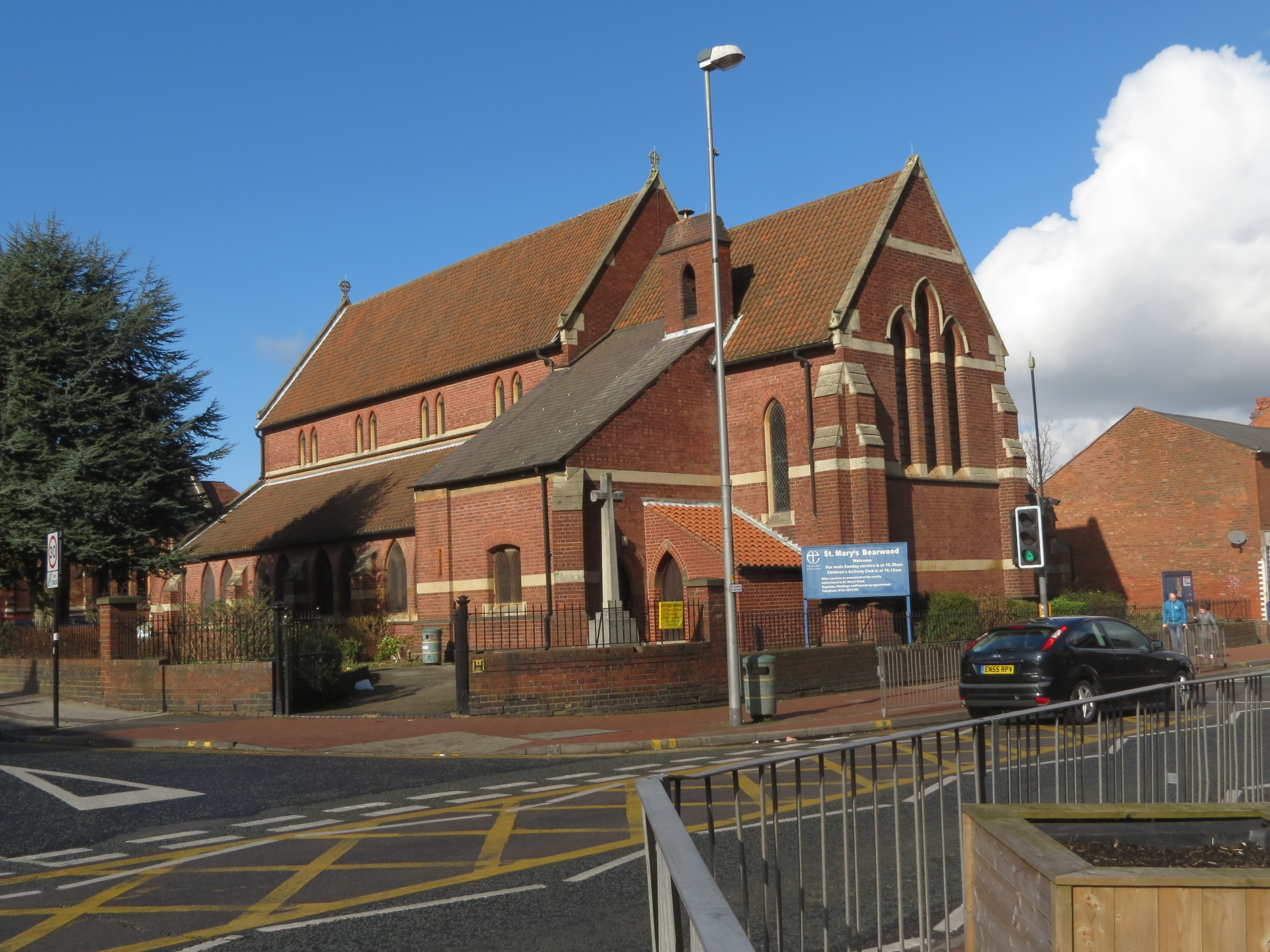
St Mary's Church

St Mary's Church of England parish church stands at the junction of Bearwood Road and St Mary's Road. The parish was originally part of the parish of St Peter's, Harborne. The red-brick building was designed by Julius Alfred Chatwin and dates from 1887. The adjacent hall was built in 1897 and extended in 1994.

Our Lady and St Gregory's Roman Catholic church is on Three Shires Oak Road.

Bearwood Baptist Church is on the corner of Bearwood Road and Rawlings Road. Bearwood Chapel is set back from Bearwood Road opposite the Bearwood Primary School. Methodist Church is now in the former Church of Christ Scientist on the junction of Sandon Road and Poplar Avenue. The original Wesleyan Methodist Church building on the corner of Sandon Road and Barnsley Road is now used by the Redeemed Christian Church of God. New Life Christian Centre is the Assembly of God Pentecostal church, located on Pargeter Road near to Thimblemill Road.

== Notable residents ==
- Julie Walters, actor
- Christine McVie, singer with Fleetwood Mac, songwriter and keyboardist
- David Hallam, British Labour politician (one time Member of the European Parliament (MEP)) and writer
- Jess Phillips, Labour politician, lived in Bearwood for a short time as a baby, her family having to move out of their Barclay Road home due to heavy mortgage repayments.
- Colin Buchanan, actor
- Julian Smith, musician
