= Church of Our Lady of Good Counsel and St Gregory the Great, Bearwood =

- Church of Our Lady of Good Counsel and St Gregory the Great, Bearwood
- 52°28′39.24″N 1°58′18.64″W
- OS grid reference: SP 02009 86627
- Location: Bearwood, West Midlands
- Country: England
- Denomination: Roman Catholic
- Website: catholicbearwood.co.uk

Architecture
- Heritage designation: Grade II
- Designated: 29 April 2016
- Architect: Philip Chatwin
- Style: Neo-Georgian
- Completed: 1934

Administration
- Diocese: Archdiocese of Birmingham

The Church of Our Lady of Good Counsel and St Gregory the Great is a Roman Catholic church in Bearwood, West Midlands, England, and in the Roman Catholic Archdiocese of Birmingham. It was built in 1934, and is Grade II listed.

== History ==
After Bearwood became an independent mission in 1909, Major Howard Galton offered a parcel of land at the corner of Park Road and Wigorn Road in Bearwood for the building of a church; Mass had from 1899 been celebrated in a former coach house behind houses on Three Shires Oak Road in Bearwood. The Galton family had been Roman Catholics since the mid 19th century; Howard Galton's ancestor Samuel Galton, a Birmingham gun manufacturer, had purchased an estate in Warley in the 1790s (now known as Warley Woods).

However, the diocesan authorities advised that the site was too small, and Howard Galton amended his will so that the proceeds from a sale of land would be used for building the church on a site approved by the trustees. The church on the approved site, built in 1934, is the Church of Our Lady and St Hubert, Warley.

The foundation stone of the church on Three Shires Oak Road was laid on 3 May 1933 by Archbishop Thomas Leighton Williams, and it was opened in 1934. It is in Neo-Georgian style. The architect, Philip Chatwin, was from the firm founded by his father J. A. Chatwin, which designed and extended many churches in the Birmingham area.

== Description ==
It is a steel-framed building faced with red brick. The south side fronting the road has, below a pediment containing an oculus, a stone statue of St Gregory the Great in a niche above the main door. There is a square tower with a pyramidal roof.

Inside, there is a barrel-vaulted ceiling above the nave and chancel. The organ is above the narthex at the liturgical west end (geographically the south end). The nave has six bays separated by pilasters, on which are fixed wooden carvings of the Stations of the Cross. There are oak-panelled dados on either side of the nave. The chancel has a marble altar and a panelled oak reredos.

The lady chapel, to the liturgical south of the nave, has three bays, a barrel-vaulted ceiling and oak-panelled walls, and there are stained glass windows, more recent than the church, by Hardman & Co.
