= St Faith and St Laurence's Church, Harborne =

St. Faith and St. Laurence's Church, Harborne
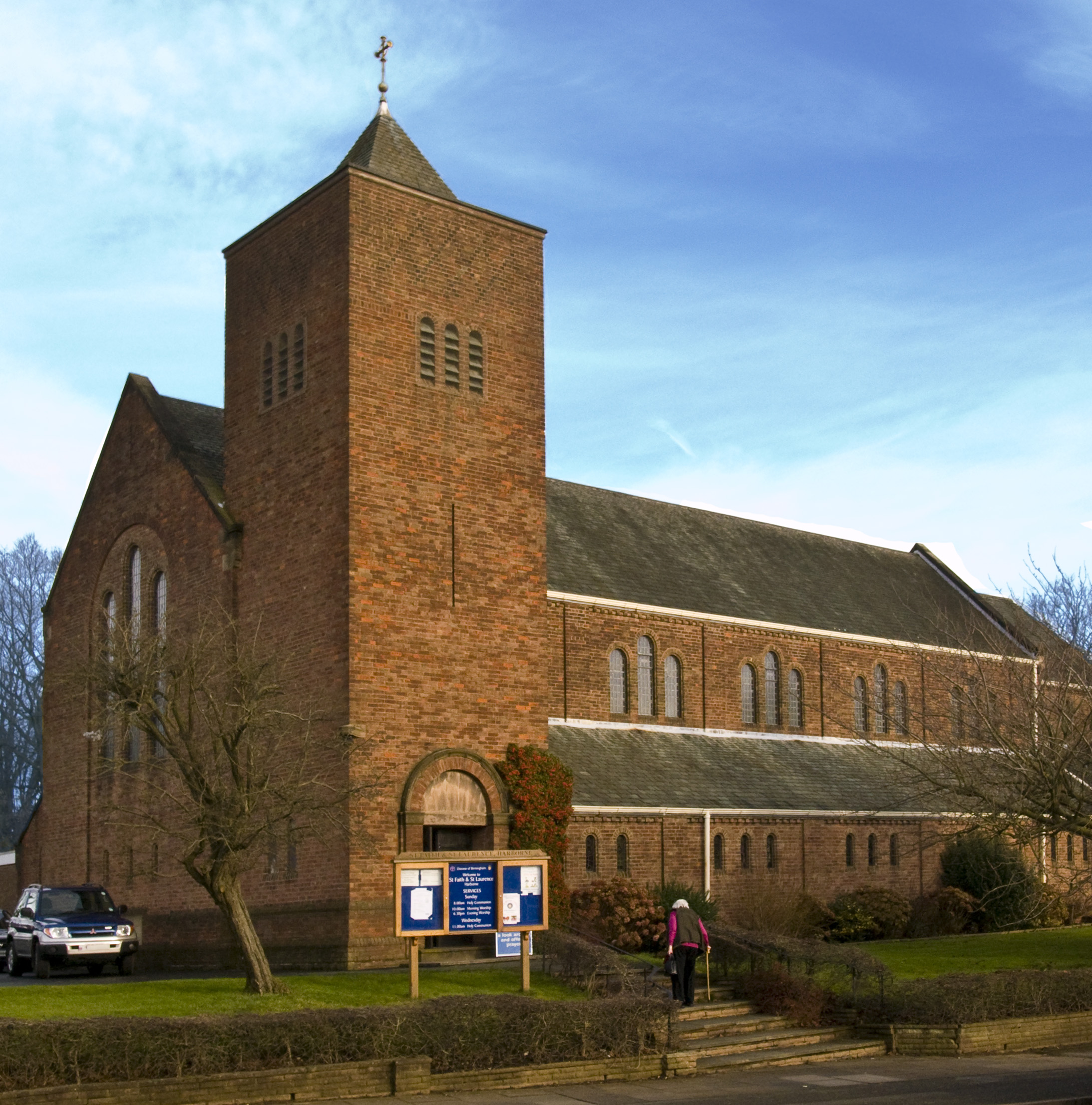
- St. Faith and St. Laurence's Church, Harborne
- 52.4613°N 1.9737°W
- OS grid reference: SP 01883 84815
- Denomination: Church of England
- Churchmanship: Central and Liberal
- Website: www.saintfaithandsaintlaurence.co.uk

History
- Dedication: St. Faith and St. Laurence

Administration
- Province: Canterbury
- Diocese: Birmingham
- Parish: Harborne

St. Faith and St. Laurence's Church, Harborne is a parish church in the Church of England in Harborne, Birmingham. It is part of the Anglican Diocese of Birmingham, and a member of Inclusive Church.

== History ==
St. Faith and St. Laurence's Church was designed by the architect P. B. Chatwin and work started in 1937. Building work was interrupted by the outbreak of the Second World War and the building was completed in 1960.

== List of Vicars ==
- 1937-1960 W.G. Sissons
- 1960-1968 Roger Price
- 1968-1988 John Rossington
- 1988-2003 Ian Michael
- 2005– 2022 Priscilla White
- 2022– present David Parker

== Organ ==
A specification of the organ can be found on the National Pipe Organ Register.
