= King Edward VI Handsworth School =

King Edward VI Handsworth School for Girls

Location
- 21 Rose Hill Road; Birmingham, West Midlands, B21 9AR; England; 52.5018°N 1.9237°W

Information
- Type: Grammar; Academy
- Motto: Dieu et mon droit (God and my right -the motto of the British monarch)
- Established: 1883
- Specialist: Arts and science
- Department for Education URN: 137047 Tables
- Ofsted: Reports
- Head Teacher: David Goodwin
- Staff: Approximately 87
- Gender: Girls
- Age: 11 to 18
- Enrolment: 1335 (as of 2024)
- Houses: 4
- Colours: Navy blue, emerald green, light blue
- Publication: The Beacon
- Alumnae: Handsworth Old Edwardians
- Website: https://kingedwardvi.bham.sch.uk

King Edward VI Handsworth School for Girls is a grammar school for girls aged 11–18 located in Handsworth, Birmingham, England. It is part of the Foundation of the Schools of King Edward VI. The school was founded in 1883 as King Edward's Aston on the site where its brother school, King Edward VI Aston School, remains to this day. In 2019 there were 1086 girls on roll. Pupils must pass an 11-plus entrance exam to get into the school. The King Edward Schools are fiercely competitive to get admission to, as only 1 in 10 is successful in passing the entrance exam. The King Edward VI Foundation holds its exams at the same time, and generally a candidate will sit one exam for multiple schools within the foundation. Notable leaver's destinations from the school in previous years have been Birmingham, Aston, Oxford, and Nottingham universities. The leavers' destinations by course were mainly medicine, dentistry, law, business studies and computer science.

The school has a record of high attainment and was deemed 'outstanding' in its last Ofsted inspection. In 2019, the Birmingham Mail ranked it as the second best school in the West Midlands, down from first place in 2018. Since 2017, GCSE pupils at King Edward VI Handsworth have consistently achieved exceptionally good results. According to the Times League Table, King Edward VI Handsworth School for Girls was ranked 13 in all of the United Kingdom.

The main building is Grade II* listed.

== History ==
When King Edward VI Grammar School for Girls opened in 1883 the first head was Margaret Nimmo who had previously been second mistress and the first graduate teacher at Blackheath High School. The school was then in the Aston area of Birmingham and it had 300 girls to educate. Half of the schools scholarships were given to girls from public elementary schools. The education approaches were information, Rote learning and competition.

Margaret Nimmo moved her school to Rosehill Road in Handsworth where it has merged with two others opening again in 1911 in a new building.

By 1915 the school role was 460. The school's science and gymnastics facilities were poor but the school sent many on to universities. When the school first opened, and for many years afterwards, girls were not permitted to eat in the street and had to wear gloves on the journey to and from school.

In the beginning, the sixth form was very small with as few as 6 pupils in a year. Transfer to King Edward VI High School for Girls for sixth form studies was not unusual.

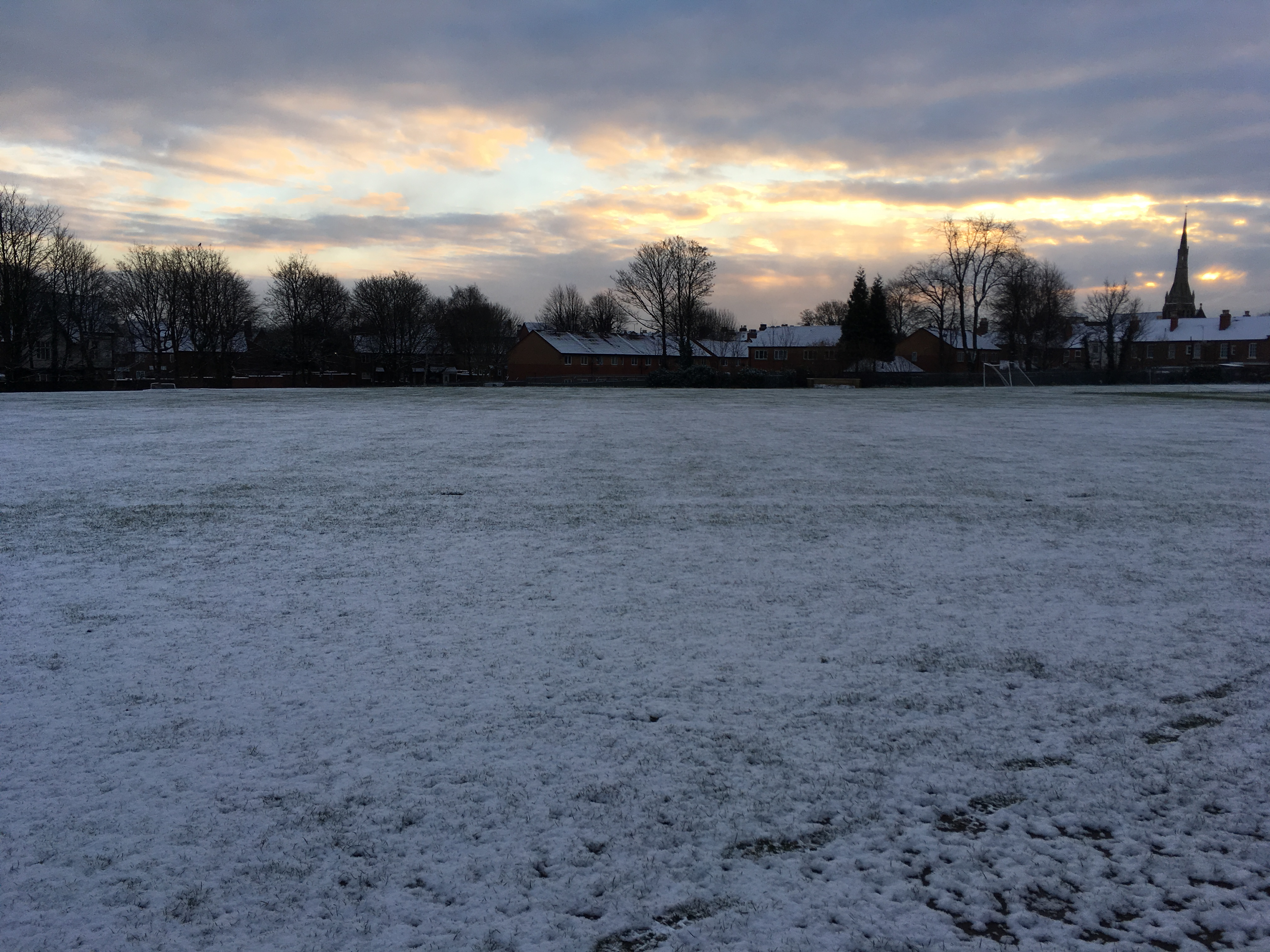
View of the School Field - February 2018

Latin was also removed from the curriculum in 2004 and replaced with drama, which had previously been on the curriculum in the late 20th century.

=== Houses ===
School Houses were introduced at the beginning of the 20th century, with each House having its own name and colour. Nightingale house was mauve, Kingsley house was green, Fry was pale blue and Browning was brown.

By the 1930s there were awards given for winning competitions against other houses in sports. In the beginning there were House notices in the Playroom and a strict House conduct system. In 1939 four more Houses were added and they were renamed after the different royal Houses – Windsor, Stuart, Tudor, Hanover, Plantagenet, Lancaster, York, Normandy.

In the 1970s the houses were rearranged again and given names of precious stones – Amethyst, Coral, Garnet and Topaz, because of the school's proximity to the Jewellery Quarter.

At the end of the 1990s they were renamed once more after famous women – Brontë, Pankhurst, Franklin and Nightingale, and when an extra form group was introduced in 2003 the new house of Curie, then retired in 2005.

In September 2009 the houses were renamed, once again after famous women, this time – Parks (yellow), Keller (blue), Astor (green) and Cavell (red). In September 2020, the house Astor (green) was renamed Baker - a name used by Noor Inayat Khan. In December 2024, houses Curie (orange) and Nightingale (purple) were reintroduced.

=== Building ===
The main school building was designed in neoclassical style by the local architect Philip Chatwin and cost £50,000 to build and opened on 14 September 1911. It uses red brick, ashlar dressings and a plain tiled roof. Chatwin's design featured a number of specialist areas, including a library, a whole school common-room, a gymnasium and a double-height, barrel-vaulted, central hall with ornate plasterwork, including a depiction of the coat of arms of King Edward VI.

As the school was built on a slope, there are two ground floors, and originally the gymnasium was located in the room on the lower ground floor later used as a Music room. Since the renovation of the church (bought by the school) into a music centre, this room is now used as an ICT suite.

In May 2025, the building was Grade II* listed (the second-highest possible category), giving it legal protection from unauthorised alteration or demolition. The listing includes the boundary gates, railings and piers.

To celebrate the centenary of the school in 1983 a new block was built to house a meeting room and the changing rooms for the sports field. In 1997 a new Sixth Form block was built with the help of the King Edward VI Foundation fund. In 2005, the new sports hall was built, using sponsorship money from companies such as O2, and a church organ was bought by the school to be renovated and used for music studies. The school also gained specialist performing arts status. 2011 saw the building of a new library by the field; a modern building with a slanting roof and colourful window panes. This includes a mezzanine area upstairs with computers.

The centenary room is currently undergoing demolition as it is being replaced by a new, two-storey building, set for completion in February 2026.

== Uniform ==
The uniform is based around navy blue.

== Notable former pupils ==
- Emma B, radio presenter
- Felicity Jones, actress
- Abigail Kelly, soprano opera and concert singer
- Sarah Manners, actress
- Flora Spencer-Longhurst, actress
- Zarah Sultana, Independent MP and leader of Your Party with Jeremy Corbyn

A society for alumni, the Handsworth Old Edwardians' Society (HOES), has been running since the turn of the 20th century. The society holds meetings for former pupils of all ages three times a year at the school.
