= All Souls' Church, Witton =

All Souls'
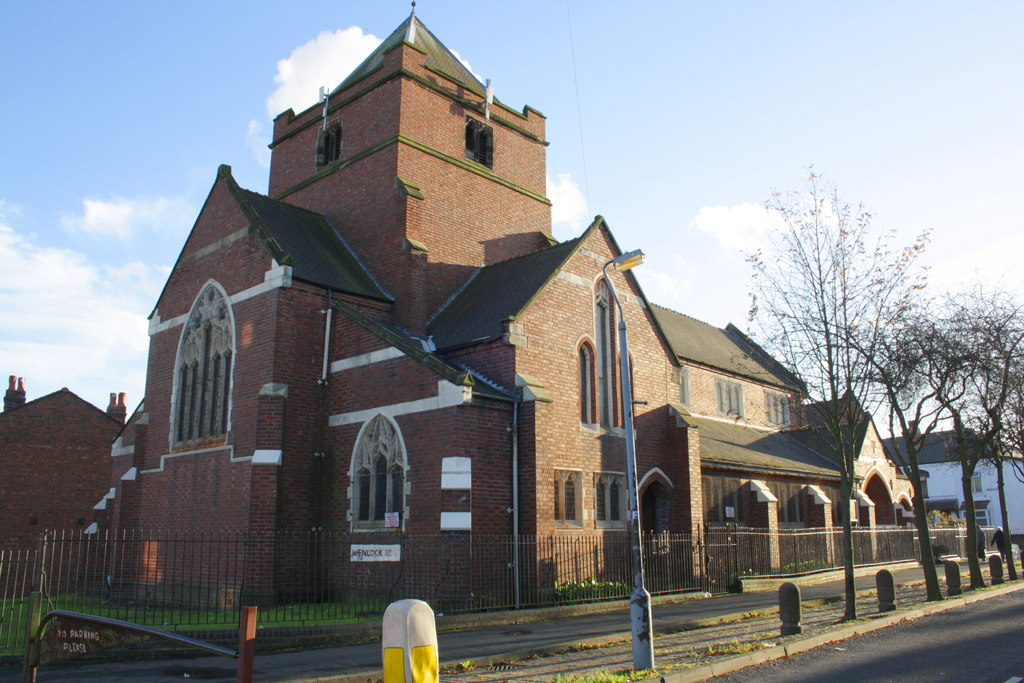
- All Souls' Church, Witton
- All Souls'
- 52°30′42.48″N 1°53′24.13″W
- OS grid reference: SP 07557 90414
- Location: Witton, Birmingham
- Country: England
- Denomination: Universal Church of God
- Previous denomination: Church of England

History
- Dedication: All Souls

Architecture
- Architect: Philip Chatwin
- Completed: 1907

All Souls' Church is a former parish church in the Church of England in Witton, Birmingham, England which is now used by the Church of God.

== History ==
In 1907, All Souls' Church on Wenlock Road was consecrated. It was built using red brick with stone dressings in the Gothic style to a design by Philip Chatwin. When opened, it had a chancel, nave, east and west aisles, and a low central tower with a pyramidal roof. In 1926, a parish was assigned out of Holy Trinity Church, Birchfield, and St. Peter and St. Paul, Aston. The living was declared a vicarage, in the gift of the Vicar of Holy Trinity, Birchfield, for the first turn only and then of the bishop.

The church was declared redundant by the Church of England in 1981 and sold to the Church of God (International).
