= Bearwood bus station =

Bus station in Smethwick, West Midlands, England

Bearwood
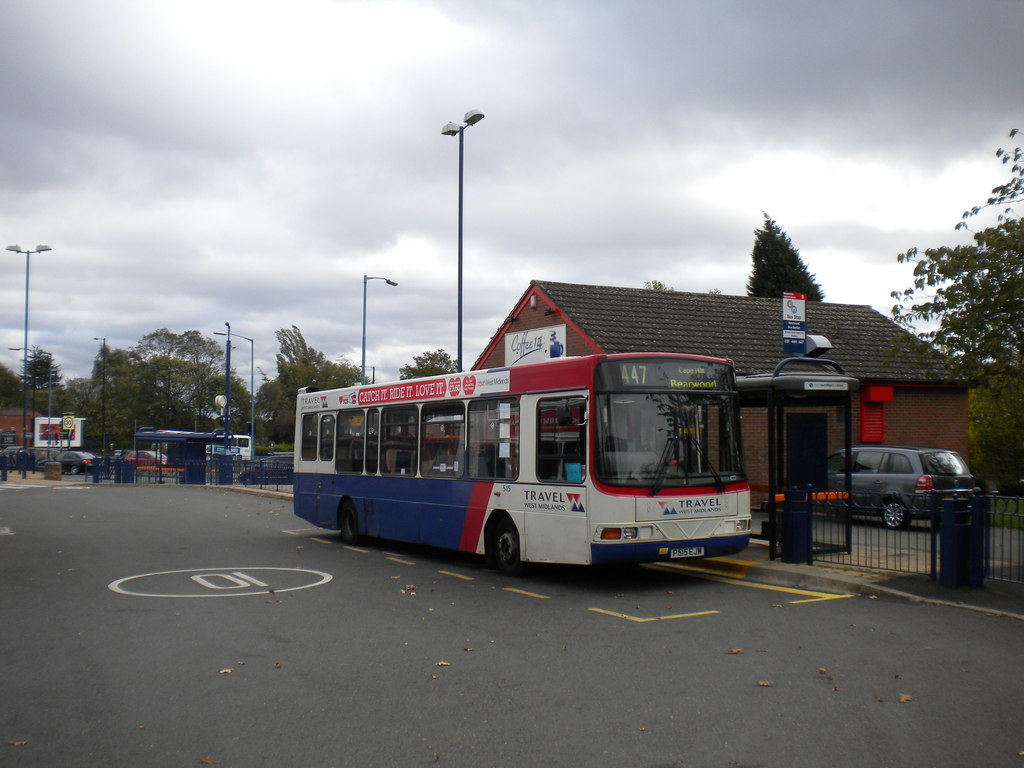

General information
- Location: Bearwood Road, Smethwick; Sandwell
- Coordinates: 52.4722°N 1.9692°W
- Operator: Network West Midlands
- Bus stands: 3 + 9 outside the station
- Bus operators: National Express West Midlands; Diamond Bus West Midlands; The Green Bus Service (school services); National Express (coach services)
- Connections: No
Location

Bearwood bus station is a small bus station in Smethwick, West Midlands, England. It is located on the Hagley Road junction with Bearwood Road. It is Smethwick's only bus station. It is accessed via one-way streets, and consequently most services use the stands located outside the station. It is managed by Transport for West Midlands.

== Facilities ==
Buses on the Hagley Road showcase bus route use layby bus stops on Hagley Road, adjacent to or opposite the bus station. The nearest bus stops for the No 11 bus route (Birmingham's outer circle) are on Lordswood Road, just south of Hagley Road, or about 100 yards up Bearwood Road. Bus routes which terminate at Bearwood, or take other routes, use the bus station where they are able to wait for time-tabled departure times.

Stands A, B & C are located in the main part of the bus station where the former cafe and toilets are located. These are managed by Sandwell Borough Council. Two stands are located on Lordswood Road alongside the Kings Head Public House, and one solitary stand is located on Bearwood Road (for service 48 towards West Bromwich only).

Buses using stands A to C need to navigate the Bearwood one-way system which only allows traffic to enter from the Lightwoods Park direction of Adkins Road and exit the station onto Bearwood Road near its junction with the Hagley Road. For safety, this is left-turn only.
