= Eve Pitts =

First black woman to be ordained as a vicar in the Church of England

- Born: Eve Sewell; Jamaica
- Occupation: Priest in the Church of England

Eve Pitts (née Sewell) is a British priest who was the first black woman to be ordained as a vicar in the Church of England. She is known for being outspoken against discrimination. She is a supporter of Emancipation Day.

== Personal life and education ==
Pitts was born in Jamaica and her parents, Kathleen and Stanley Sewell, moved to England in 1956. Her father worked in a chemical plant in Nottingham and died aged 35. Pitts initially attended a boarding school but came to England after her father died. She was a committed Christian from childhood, and taught in Sunday School when she was seven. She worked in the civil service for many years before responding to a call to ministry. She married Anthony Pitts, a civil servant, and they have a daughter and two sons. She trained at the Queen's Foundation in 1988.

== Ministry ==
Pitts was ordained as a deacon in 1989. In 1994, Pitts was one of the first black women ordained priest in the Church of England, and went on to be the first black woman to become a vicar.

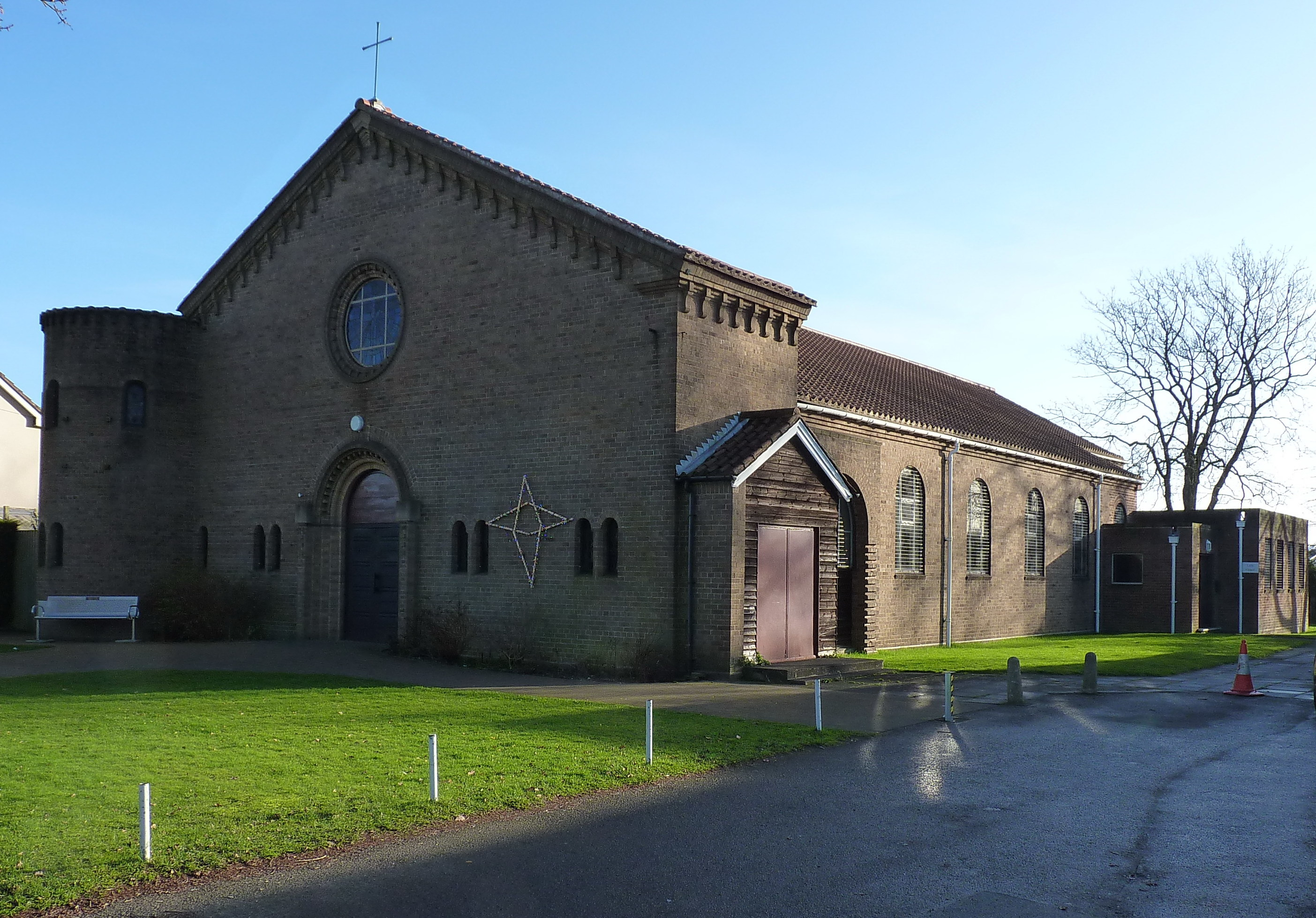
The Immanuel Church on Highter's Heath Lane in Birmingham in 2020

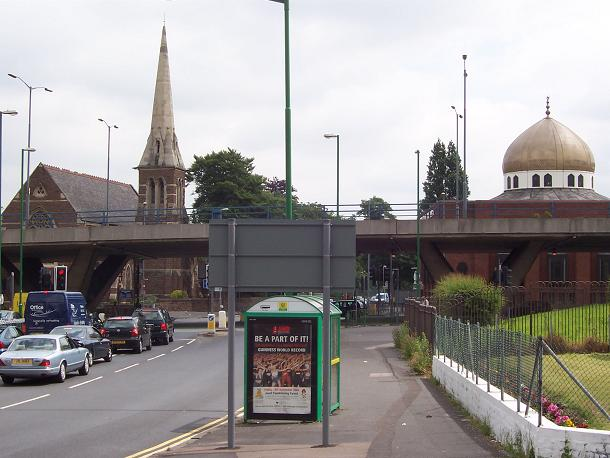
Pitts's church from 2010 (left), Birchfield

She spent three years at her first church in Bartley Green, Birmingham. She then moved to Saint Nicolas' church in Kings Norton, Birmingham. In 1997, after she had experienced being marginalised through sexist and racist attitudes for some time, she spoke about this during a service. This led to controversy and the Bishop of Birmingham asked her to resign. The Association of Black Clergy supported her. As a consequence, Pitts began ministry in a community hall and was then offered a new parish at Immanuel church in Highter's Heath in mid-1998. Relationships became better in this new church and she stayed there for more than a decade. Among other things, Pitts and the congregation raised substantial amounts of money needed for repairs to the church building. In 2010 she moved to Holy Trinity church in the inner city parish of Birchfield, in the Birmingham diocese. This church building also needed repairs and was able to obtain funding from the National Lottery Heritage Fund.

She considers that history should be remembered and commemorated, including the transatlantic slave trade. Otherwise:

[I]t will continue to undermine our own understanding of who God has meant us to be [...] No matter how successful we are – and some of us are very successful – there will be something that is missing there. There will be a wall. We will not be able to fly without a clear understanding of who we are, warts and all, and of the slave trade.

Since 2015 she has held a series of commemorative services for remembrance of ancestors on the third Sunday in September. This follows from her study and prayer around racism and the legacy of slavery, including within the Church of England. Pitts is noted for being a "fierce critic" of the Church of England. She is also promoting recognition within the Church of England of 1 August as Emancipation Day, since it was the day that the Slavery Abolition Act 1833, the law which abolished slavery in Britain's overseas possessions, came into force in 1834.
