= P. B. Chatwin =

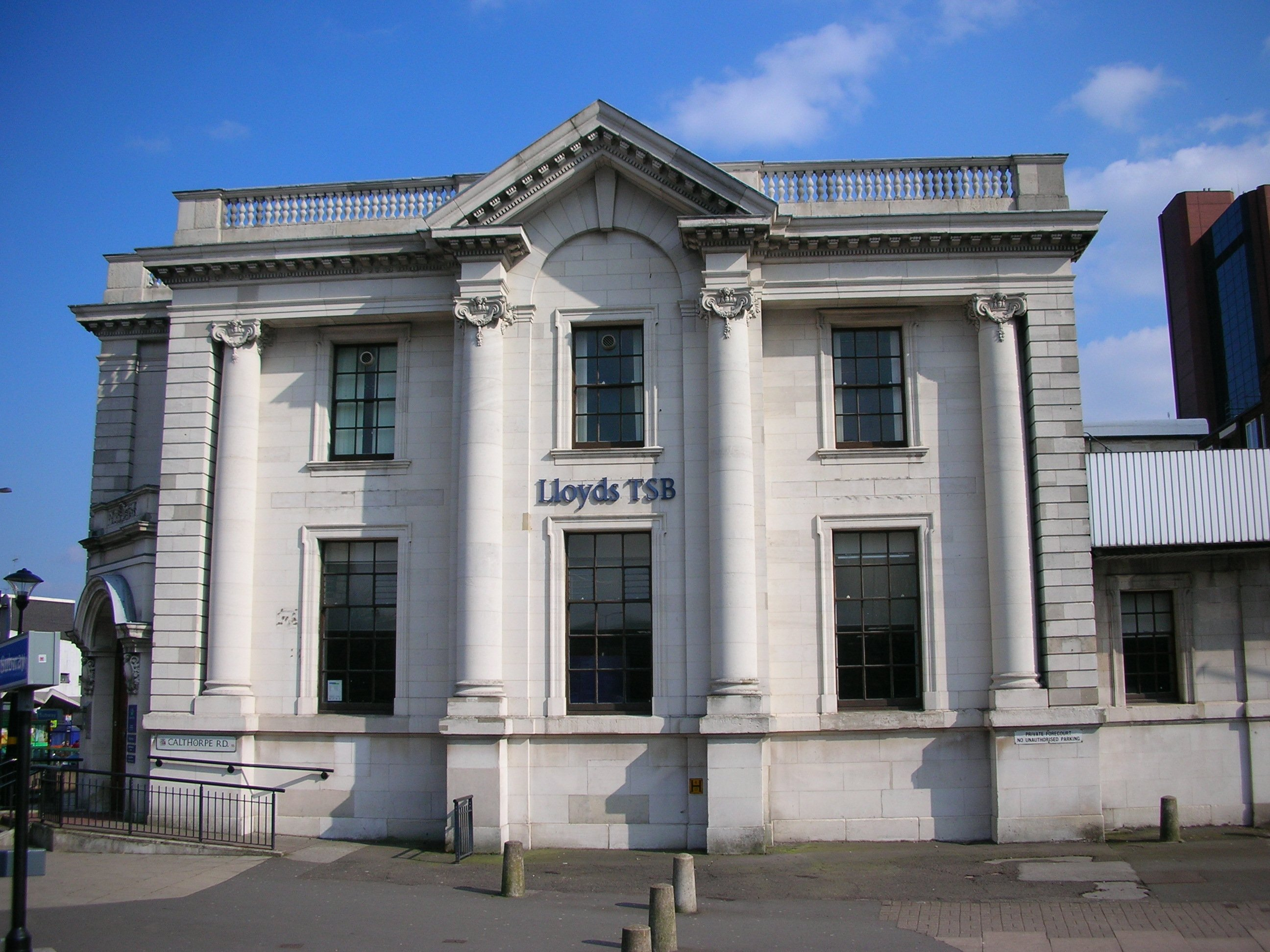
Lloyds Bank, Five Ways, Birmingham

Philip Boughton Chatwin (1873 – 17 December 1964) was an architect and archaeologist in Birmingham, England.

== Early life and education ==
A son of the architect J. A. Chatwin, he was educated at the University of Birmingham, taking an MA, and qualified as an architect, becoming FRIBA.

== Career ==
Having been articled to his father and to E. W. Mountford, of Lower Regent Street, London, and studied design under William Bidlake at the Birmingham School of Art, from 1866 he worked with his father, and in 1897 became a partner in the firm, J. A. Chatwin & Son. From 1936, Philip's nephew Anthony Chatwin was his partner in the business. The repair of churches was a speciality. In 1911 he designed the new building for King Edward VI Handsworth School for the head Margaret Nimmo who was moving with her school from Aston.

An enthusiastic archaeologist and local historian, he was elected a Fellow of the Society of Antiquaries. He also sat on the Council of The Royal Archaeological Institute of Great Britain and Ireland from which he retired in 1943. He was honoured with a festschrift by Birmingham Archaeological Society and, after his death, the Society recorded that it had lost "the last and one of the most active and distinguished of its founder members", and that he had "for the greater part of this century, embodied the history and antiquities of the County of Warwickshire". He was appointed OBE in 1953, for archaeological services to the Ministry of Works.

As well as writing a number of articles for journals such as The Antiquaries Journal and many for the Birmingham Archaeological Society Transactions, he was the author of the book The Medieval Patterned Tiles of Warwickshire (1940) and editor of The Records of King Edward's School, Birmingham (1948). His writings are often still listed as recommended reading, for example, a number of his articles, including 'The Decoration of the Beauchamp Chapel, Warwick, with special reference to the sculptures' in Archaeologia, LXXVI, 1928, are included on the ‘Gothic Reading List’ of the Victoria and Albert Museum, London and, not unsurprisingly, reflecting his love of his home county, works by him are on the recommended reading list for Warwick University’s History of Art course, Special Studies in Historic Architecture.

Apart from his research findings which continue to be cited (see footnotes below for examples), Chatwin’s legacy is remembered in other ways; photographs and plans are held by Birmingham: Archives, Heritage and Photography Service, Warwickshire County Record Office and The Library of Birmingham and working papers of the scholar Gordon McNeil Rushforth, held in the University of Exeter archives, include correspondence with Chatwin. Photographs attributed to Chatwin, including images of the interior of Beauchamp Chapel, St Mary’s Church, Warwick which he researched and wrote about extensively, are held by the Conway Library, whose archive, of primarily architectural images, is in the process of being digitised under the wider Courtauld Connects project.

Chatwin also made gifts and donations to local institutes, for example, medieval floor tiles from Maxstoke Castle are held by Warwick Museum and a watercolour of a stained glass window design for St. Philip's Cathedral, Birmingham was gifted to Birmingham City Museum and Art Gallery.

== Personal life ==
In 1906, Chatwin married Cecily Frances (1882-1968), daughter of chartered surveyor and land agent Robert Edward Couchman, of Birmingham, of a gentry family of Solihull They had no children.

== Works ==
- All Souls' Church, Witton (consecrated 1907).
- The Church of St Augustine of Hippo, Edgbaston (porch and door on south aisle erected, and a new door opened from the choir vestry into the church, 1907). To celebrate the church's centenary in 1968, a new narthex porch was added at the west end to an earlier design by P. B. Chatwin.
- King Edward VI Handsworth girls' school (opened 1911).
- St Mary, Moseley (nave and south aisle rebuilt 1910; repaired war damage 1952-54), Grade II listed
- St Mary the Virgin, Acocks Green Church and Church Hall, Acocks Green (opened c. 1908)
- Lloyds Bank, New Street, Birmingham (1914), Five Ways, Birmingham (1908–09), Leicester (1903)
- Church of Our Lady of Good Counsel and St Gregory the Great, Bearwood (opened 1934)
- St. Faith and St. Laurence's Church, Harborne 1936-37
- Queen Alexandra Kindergarten for the Blind, Harborne, Birmingham Royal Institution for the Blind
- St Philip's Cathedral, Birmingham (repaired war damage, 1947 and re-faced the tower, 1958)
