= Holy Trinity Church, Birchfield =

Holy Trinity
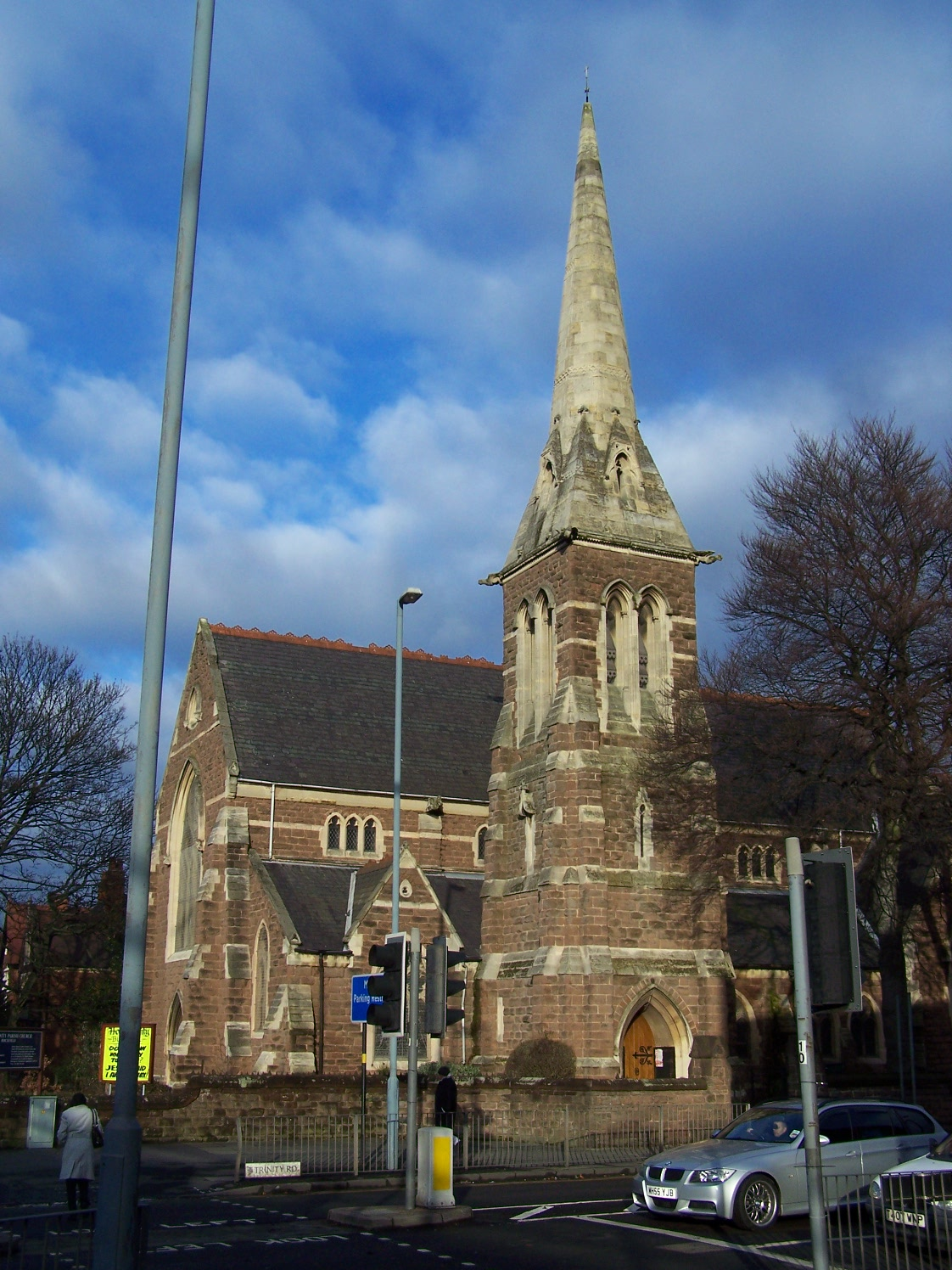
- Holy Trinity
- 52°30′30.21″N 1°54′8.18″W
- OS grid reference: SP 06694 90103
- Location: Birchfield, Birmingham
- Country: England
- Denomination: Church of England

History
- Dedication: Holy Trinity

Architecture
- Heritage designation: Grade II* listed
- Architect: J. A. Chatwin
- Style: Victorian Gothic
- Completed: 1864

Specifications
- Length: 117 feet (36 m)
- Width: 48.5 feet (14.8 m)
- Materials: Hollington sandstone

Administration
- Diocese: Anglican Diocese of Birmingham
- Archdeaconry: Birmingham
- Deanery: Handsworth
- Parish: Birchfield

Holy Trinity Church is a Grade II* listed parish church in the Church of England in Birchfield, Birmingham. The church building was placed on a Heritage at Risk Register due to its poor condition in 2018, but repairs led to its removal from this register.

== History ==
The foundation stone was laid on 26 May 1863, and the church was built by the architect J. A. Chatwin and builders Briggs & Son of rock faced red sandstone with white limestone bands and dressings. It was consecrated on 17 May 1864, by John Lonsdale, the Bishop of Lichfield. It was built for a congregation of 612 people. The building is 117 ft long, 48.5 ft wide.

The church has a good collection of stained glass by the best Victorian manufacturers including Clayton and Bell; Heaton, Butler and Bayne; John Hardman; and Alexander Gibbs of Bedford.

A parish was assigned in 1865 out of St Mary's Church, Handsworth. In 1926, part of the parish was taken to form a parish for All Souls' Church, Witton.

Eve Pitts became the vicar of the church in 2010 and a grant was obtained from the National Lottery Heritage Fund to assist repairs to the church building. In 2018, the church building, especially the roof, had been placed on Historic England's Heritage at Risk Register due to its poor condition, but the repairs have led to its removal from this register.

== Organ ==
The church contained an organ dating from 1866 by Banfield. A specification of the organ can be found on the National Pipe Organ Register.
