= Edward Cheshire =

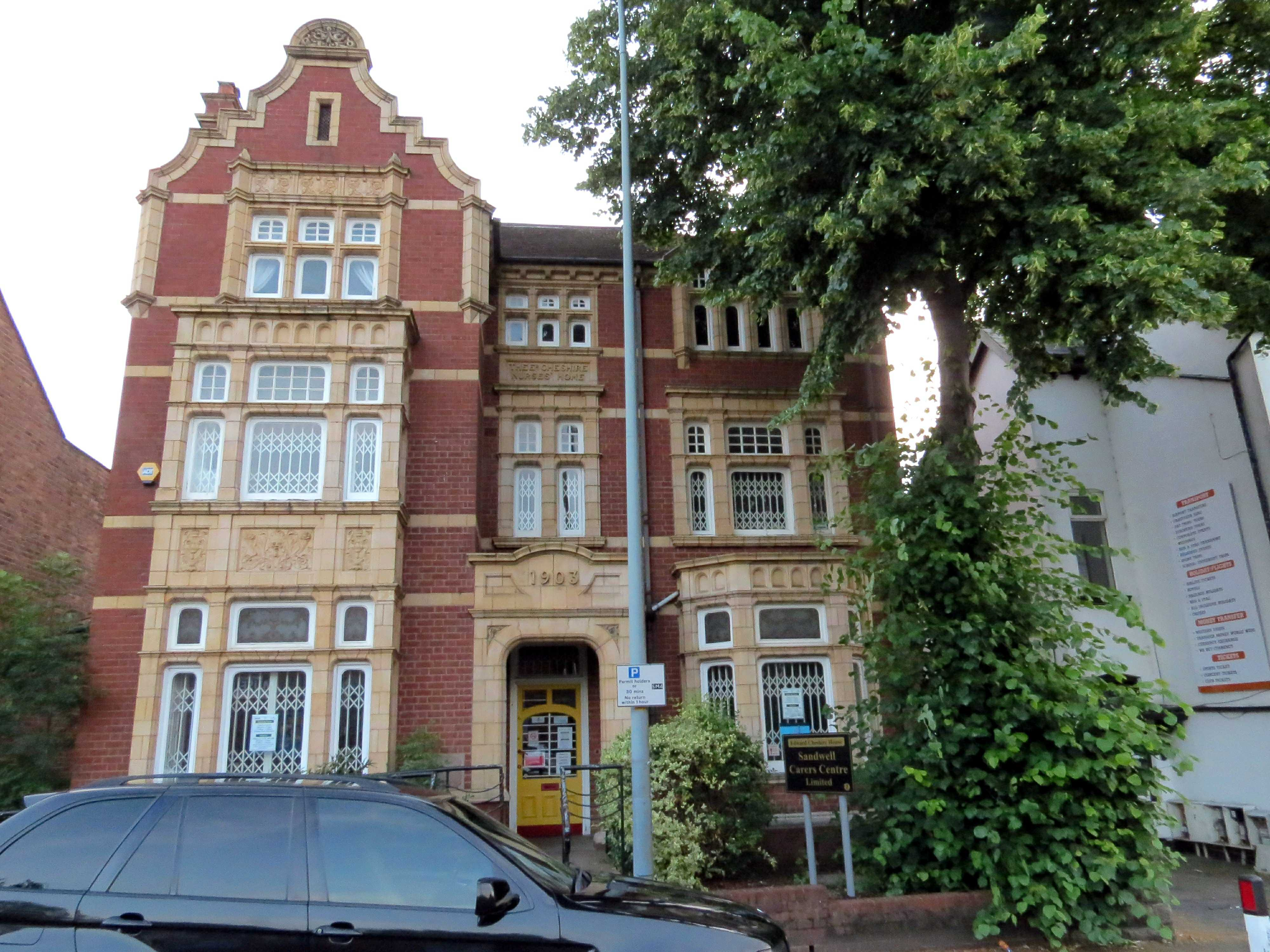
Edward Cheshire Nurses Home

Alderman Edward Cheshire, J.P. (c. 1841 – 13 July 1919) was a nineteenth century British brewer who was Mayor of Smethwick, England, from 1902 to 1903.

Cheshire is commemorated in the street name Cheshire Road which runs between Smethwick Council House and Smethwick Old Church. His local benefactions include an extension to the Churchyard of Smethwick Old Church, and the Edward Cheshire Nurses Home, dated 1903.

Cheshire died in Edgbaston on 13 July 1919 at the age of 78.
