= 1874–75 Aston Villa F.C. season =

Aston Villa
1874–75 season
- President: H.H. Hartshorne
- Secretary: Charlie H. Midgley

The 1874–75 English football season was Aston Villa's first season, fourteen years before the creation of the Football League.

The first game in Birmingham played under association football rules may have been Saltley College Football Club's 1–0 victory over Incogniti on 15 February 1873, but Association football had been slow to take off in Birmingham in comparison to rugby football. Calthorpe Football Club claimed to be the first club in Birmingham with its only matches among club members. The Sheffield rules were popular in the north of England and Calthorpe was keen to promote the association laws. In November 1873, club secretary John Campbell Orr published a letter in the local press, following which a number of other clubs were founded in and around the city. Aston Park had become available to the public for recreation, and this led to several new clubs being founded in the district sharing the footballing areas.

In November 1874 Villa's founders were members of the Wesleyan Chapel at Villa Cross. According to one, Jack Hughes, their Bible meetings consisted around 200 young men some of whom had already set up a cricket team. The cricketers were keen to find an outlet for their energy in the off-season, they were initially undecided between rugby and association football but one member, Billy Mason, was playing with the Adderley Park Grasshoppers rugby team and four members, Hughes, William Scattergood, Walter Price and George Matthews, were tasked with watching him play. Grasshoppers were due to play the Handsworth rugby club at Heathfield Park so the four attended the match. Having seen the game, the four men returned along Heathfield Road. They adjourned beneath a dim gas light near Villa Cross and between themselves agreed rugby was a little too rough and that they would play association football. The gas lamp meeting is traditionally held as the birth of Aston Villa Football Club.

Co-founder Hughes' view was that Aston Villa Football Club was really formed later by the players who attended the first kick-about on a plot on Westminster Road, now the RCCG Salvation Theatre. They hired a football for 1s 6d (roughly 1/3 the daily wage) from Clapshaw & Cleave. The sixteen then each contributed a shilling and elected Price as their first captain and Charlie H. Midgley as club secretary. H H Hartshorne president of the chapel's bible class was the football club's first President.

Originally team captains would consult each other in order to resolve any dispute on the pitch. This role was now delegated to an umpire. Each team would bring their own partisan umpire allowing the team captains to concentrate on the game.

== Friendlies ==
9 January 1875	Aston Villa	0–1	Aston Park Unity	Aston Park
		Report	Goal
Note: In January 1875 Aston Villa played their first recorded game under Sheffield Association Rules against Aston Park Unity. George Matthews was captain and co-founders Walter Price, John Hughes and William Scattergood also played. German full-back, Billy Weis became the club's first foreign player. Only two of the players, Ted Lee and Billy Mason, would go on to represent Villa in their first FA Cup campaign. Aston Park Unity won 1-0. In addition to Aston Park Unity, Aston Villa competed for space at Aston Park with Aston Harold, Excelsior, St George's F.C. and shorter-lived outfits.

15 March 1875	Aston Villa	1–0	Aston, St Mary's	Wilson Road, Birchfield, Birmingham
	Hughes
Note: The second match, Aston Villa's first-ever victory, was arranged against the members' friends and cricket opponents at Aston, St Mary's. James Wilson allowed the game to be played at his building plots on Wilson Road, Birchfield. Aston Villa Football Club played in scarlet and royal blue hooped shirts, white shorts and royal blue caps and stockings. The club rules stated "No member can take place in a match unless in the above uniform". St Mary's played rugby so a compromise was reached whereby, using the round ball, Villa played rugby in the first half and soccer in the second. Under the Sheffield Rules up to fifteen players were allowed at the time. St Mary's rugby football club had been founded by future Villa player & director, Charlie Johnstone. In later years he reminisced "Hack him down - sit on his head, was the cry for one half the game, and You must not collar-charge him, was yelled for the other". Scattergood kept goal; the full-backs were Price, Weis and Fred J. Knight; half-backs were Midgely, Ted Lee, Harry and George Matthews; forwards: Hughes, Mason, William Sothers, Wiiliam Such, Harry Whately, George Page, and Alfred Robbins. After a goalless first-half, Hughes scored the only goal off the rebound when the goal-keeper spilled his first effort. In a newspaper article, almost fifty years later, in March 1924, Hughes was insistent that this was Villa's first match and had occurred on the third Saturday of March 1874. However a report of the event was published in Birmingham Morning News on 16 March 1875.
