= History of Aston Villa F.C. (1874–1961) =

History of an English football club

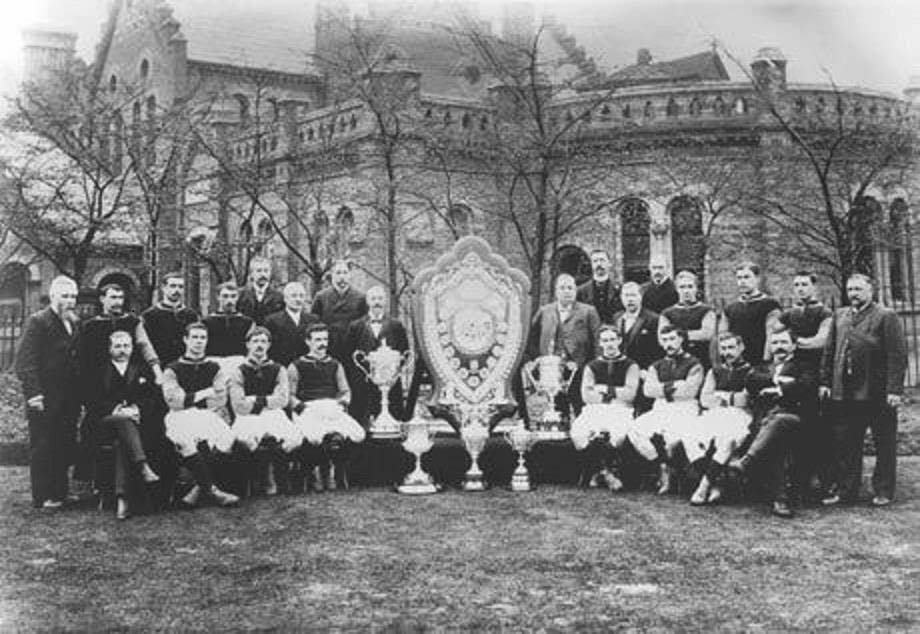
The very successful Aston Villa team of the late 19th century, here pictured in 1899

Chart showing the progress of Aston Villa F.C. through the English football league system from the inaugural season in 1888–89 to the present

Aston Villa Football Club are an English association football club based in Aston, Birmingham. They were formed in 1874, and played nine years in the FA Cup and local cup competitions before becoming a founder member of the Football League in the 1888–89 season. Aston Villa were one of the dozen teams that competed in the inaugural Football League in 1888 with the club's vice-president William McGregor being the league's founder. They played in the top league in England until the 1935–56 season when they were relegated into the Second Division. They have won the English League championship seven times: in 1894, 1896, 1897, 1899, 1900, 1910 and, most recently, in 1981. They have also been runners-up on a further nine occasions: in 1889, 1903, 1908, 1911, 1913, 1914, 1931, 1933 and 1990.

Aston Villa emerged as the most successful English club of the Victorian era. By the end of Villa's "Golden Age" at the start of the First World War, the club had won six of their seven League Championships and the FA Cup five times (1887, 1895, 1897, 1905, 1913).

Aston Villa won their sixth FA Cup in 1920. For the remainder of the inter-war years though, Villa were on a slow decline. They returned to the top-tier of English football by the outbreak of the Second World War. As with many clubs, the war brought much change to Villa Park and remainder of the 1940s were spent rebuilding the team. By 1957, Villa were a Cup winning side once again with the club's seventh FA Cup win. Even though Villa won the inaugural League Cup in 1960, the club were to enter into a very unsuccessful period. The 1960s saw much change at Villa Park. By the end of the 1960s, Villa were languishing in the Second Division and fan pressure led to the resignation of the Board and the introduction of Doug Ellis as Villa Chairman.

== Villa Cross ==
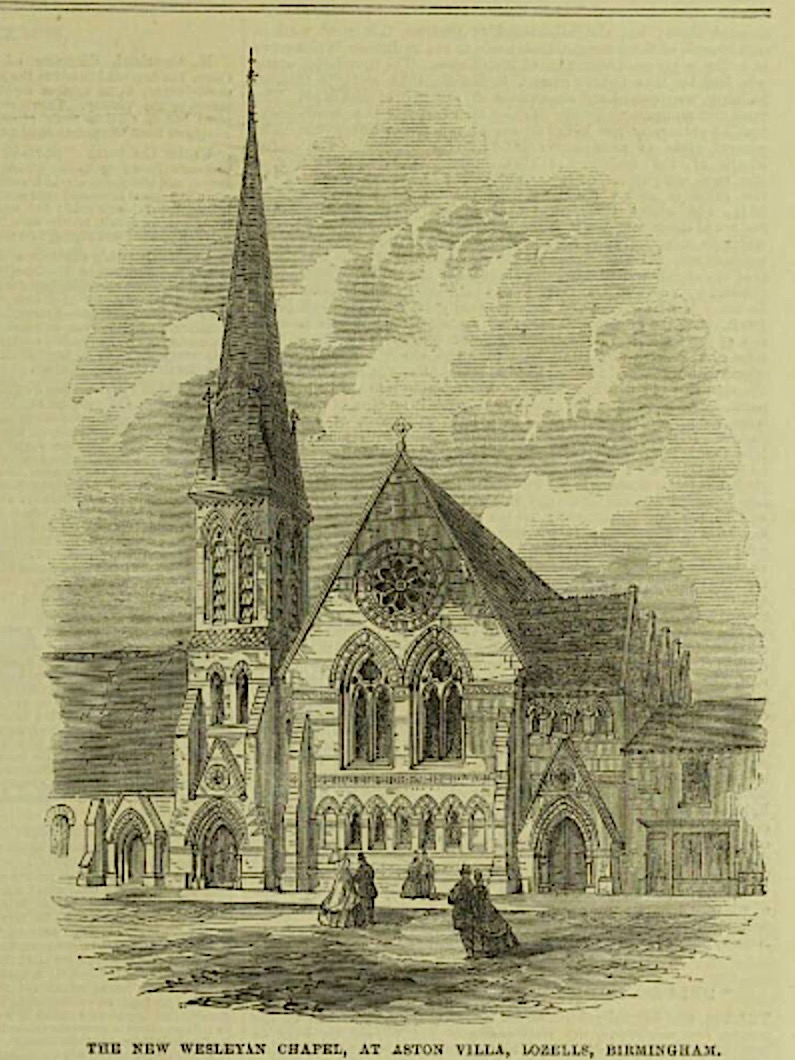
Aston Villa Wesleyan Chapel, Villa Cross

The club ultimately derives its name from the house of dialmaker and factor, Richard Blood. In the early 1800s Blood moved to Handsworth, at the time a village in Staffordshire. He was the earliest known owner of the large Georgian house named Aston Villa, first mapped in 1818 and located at a fork in the road near the border with Aston in Warwickshire. Around 1825 when the surrounding areas were sold off as building plots, the roads to Bristnall's End and to Aston Park had been named Heathfield Road and Lozells Road, the third road from Soho Manufactory became Aston Villa Road. In July 1825 John Skally moved his school to the building from Caroline Street. Skally's daughter Eliza continued with the Aston Villa Boarding School at the house, marrying the banker Charles Geach. The Aston School Board agreed for the school to close in September 1879.

The road junction was documented as Villa Cross by 1851 and was now a crossroads following the recent cutting of Barker Street. By 1848 Villa Road was becoming the common name while the Aston Villa Tavern/Villa Cross Inn had been built beside the school nearer the junction The original public house was replaced in 1937; in 1985, a police raid on the pub sparked the Handsworth riots.

In 1850 a Methodist chapel was established adjacent to the pub on the corner of George Street and Lozells Road on the Aston side of the boundary on a site now occupied by The New Testament Church of God. Officially the Aston Villa Wesleyan Chapel, it was informally known as the Villa Cross Wesleyan Chapel due to its location beside the pub at the crossroads.

By a process of toponymic transfer the local neighbourhood had come to be known as Aston Villa and, when the young men of the chapel Bible Class formed the Aston Villa Cricket Club they were not the only team to carry the name. In 1874 and 1875 the newspapers carried reports covering a rival cricket team, Aston Villa United.

Association football had been slow to take off in Birmingham in comparison to rugby football. The earliest reported match for Saltley College Football Club, a 1–0 victory over Incogniti on 15 February 1873, may have been the first game in Birmingham played under association football rules. Calthorpe Football Club claimed to be the first club in Birmingham with its only matches among club members. The Sheffield rules were popular in the north of England and Calthorpe was promoting the association laws. In November 1873, club secretary John Campbell Orr published a letter in the local press, following which a number of other clubs were founded in and around the city.

== Early years ==
In 1874 Villa's founders were members of the Wesleyan Chapel at Villa Cross. According to one, Jack Hughes, their Bible meetings consisted around 200 young men some of whom had already set up a cricket team. The cricketers were keen to find an outlet for their energy in the off-season, they were initially undecided between rugby and association football but one member, Billy Mason, was playing with the Adderley Park Grasshoppers rugby team and four members, Hughes, William Scattergood, Walter Price and George Matthews, were tasked with watching him play. Grasshoppers were due to play the Handsworth rugby club at Heathfield Park so the four attended the match. Having seen the game, the four men returned along Heathfield Road. They adjourned beneath a dim gas light near Villa Cross and between themselves agreed rugby was a little too rough and that they would play association football. The gas lamp meeting is traditionally held as the birth of Aston Villa Football Club.

Co-founder Hughes' view was that Aston Villa Football Club was really formed later by the players who attended the first kick-about on a plot on Westminster Road, now the RCCG Salvation Theatre. They hired a football for 1s 6d (roughly 1/3 the daily wage) from Clapshaw & Cleave. The sixteen then each contributed a shilling and elected Price as their first captain and Charlie H. Midgley as club secretary. H H Hartshorne president of the chapel's bible class was the football club's first President. In January 1875 Aston Villa played their first recorded game against Aston Park Unity. Matthews was captain and Price, Hughes and Scattergood also played. German full-back, Billy Weis became the club's first foreign player. Only two of the players, Ted Lee and Billy Mason, would go on to represent Villa in their first FA Cup campaign. Aston Park Unity won 1-0.

The second match, Aston Villa's first-ever victory, was arranged against the members' friends and cricket opponents at Aston, St Mary's. James Wilson allowed the game to be played at his building plots on Wilson Road, Birchfield. Aston Villa Football Club played in scarlet and royal blue hooped shirts, white shorts and royal blue caps and stockings. The club rules stated "No member can take place in a match unless in the above uniform". St Mary's played rugby so a compromise was reached whereby, using the round ball, Villa played rugby in the first half and soccer in the second. Under the Sheffield Rules up to fifteen players were allowed at the time. St Mary's rugby football club had been founded by future Villa player & director, Charlie Johnstone. In later years he reminisced "Hack him down - sit on his head, was the cry for one half the game, and You must not collar-charge him, was yelled for the other". Scattergood kept goal; the full-backs were Price, Weis and Fred J. Knight; half-backs were Midgely, Lee, Harry and George Matthews; forwards: Hughes, Mason, William Sothers, Wiiliam Such, Harry Whately, George Page, and Alfred Robbins. After a goalless first-half, Hughes scored the only goal off the rebound when the goal-keeper spilled his first effort. In a newspaper article, almost fifty years later, in March 1924, Hughes was insistent that this was Villa's first match and had occurred on the third Saturday of March 1874. However a report of the event was published in Birmingham Morning News on 16 March 1875.

Aston Park had become available to the public for recreation, and this led to several new clubs being founded in the district, sharing the footballing areas. In addition to St George's F.C., Aston Villa competed for space with Aston Harold, Excelsior and shorter-lived outfits. Villa were active within the Birmingham & District Football Association, being founder members in late 1875. One of the first games for Villa was against St George's in December 1875. In November 1876, Aston Villa lost 0–1 at home to Tipton in the Birmingham Senior Cup. At the time Villa were in the shadow of The Birmingham Club of the Aston Lower Grounds who were able to commandeer the best men in the district for the important matches. This would change from when George Ramsay came to join in 1876. Word spread and spectators began turning up to watch the little man nicknamed 'Scotty'. He also took charge of training, introducing the short, quick "passing game" leading to a dramatic improvement in results. Ramsay, noted that in order to progress, Villa would need to move into an enclosed ground to be able to collect gate money.

Villa moved to their first official home, Wellington Road in Perry Barr. The site was taken on a three-year lease at a rent of £7,10 shillings for the first year, rising to £15 and £20 in subsequent years. In 1878–79 Birmingham Senior Cup, Aston Unity F.C. beat Aston Villa in the first round of the competition, in front of a crowd of 1,700 at the Trinity Ground. but Villa were improving greatly and by 1880, won their first senior honour when they won the Birmingham Senior Cup under the captaincy of Scotsman Ramsay.

== Rise to prominence ==
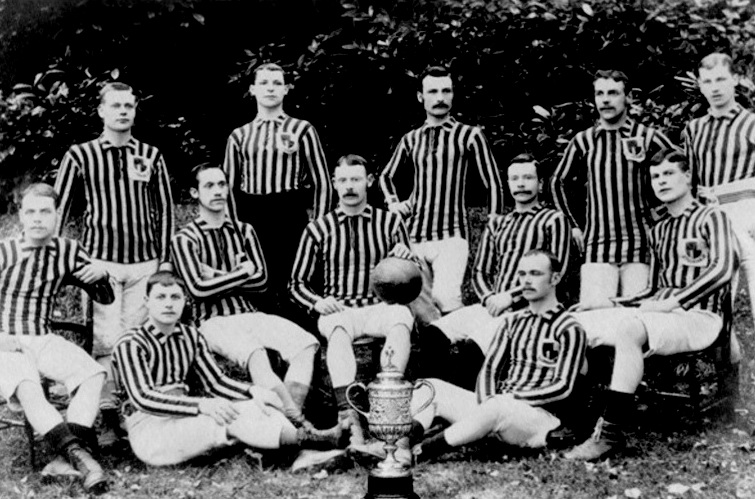
Aston Villa players posing with the 1887 FA Cup trophy

The club won its first FA Cup in 1887, under the captaincy of another Scotsman, Archie Hunter. They beat West Bromwich Albion 2–0 in the final held at The Oval. Up until 1885, football had remained an amateur sport. It turned professional in 1885, when the FA legalized professional football, but with a national wage limit. However, the Scottish draper and director of Aston Villa, William McGregor had become frustrated with watching his team in one-sided friendly matches and low attendances for all games but FA Cup ties. He saw that in order to keep interest in the game alive, the top teams needed to play each other in a league much like American baseball teams did. McGregor wrote to the twelve leading clubs in England proposing the formation of a league, what would later be known as the English Football League. Aston Villa were one of the dozen teams that competed in the inaugural Football League in 1888. Villa's first League game came on 8 September 1888, when they drew 1–1 Wolverhampton Wanderers as Tom Green scored the club's first League goal. Villa finished runners-up to Preston North End in that inaugural season.

== Victorian and Edwardian eras ==
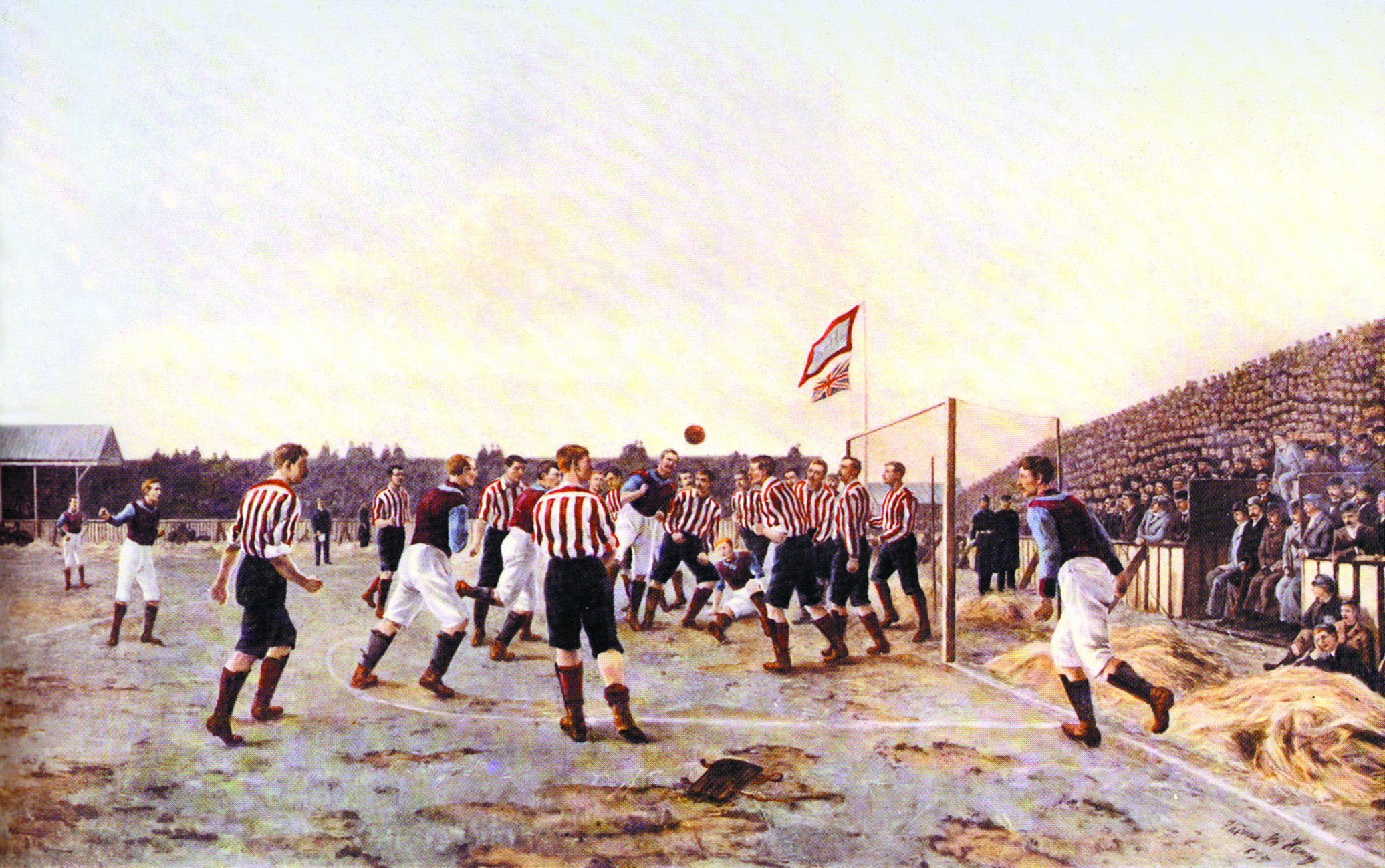
One of the earliest football paintings in the world, Thomas MM Hemy's "Sunderland v. Aston Villa 1895", depicts a match between the two most successful English teams of the decade.

Despite Villa founding the league, by 1893 they had yet to win it. Villa Committee Member Frederick Rinder was the instigator of a club meeting at Barwick Street in February 1893 that removed the committee running the club at the time. All fourteen committee members resigned and were replaced by a committee of five led by Rinder after he gave a speech criticising the board's tolerance of ill discipline and players' drinking. The following season saw Villa win their first League Championship, the season after that they won their second FA Cup in 1894–95. This was followed by back-to-back League titles in 1895-96 and 1896–97.

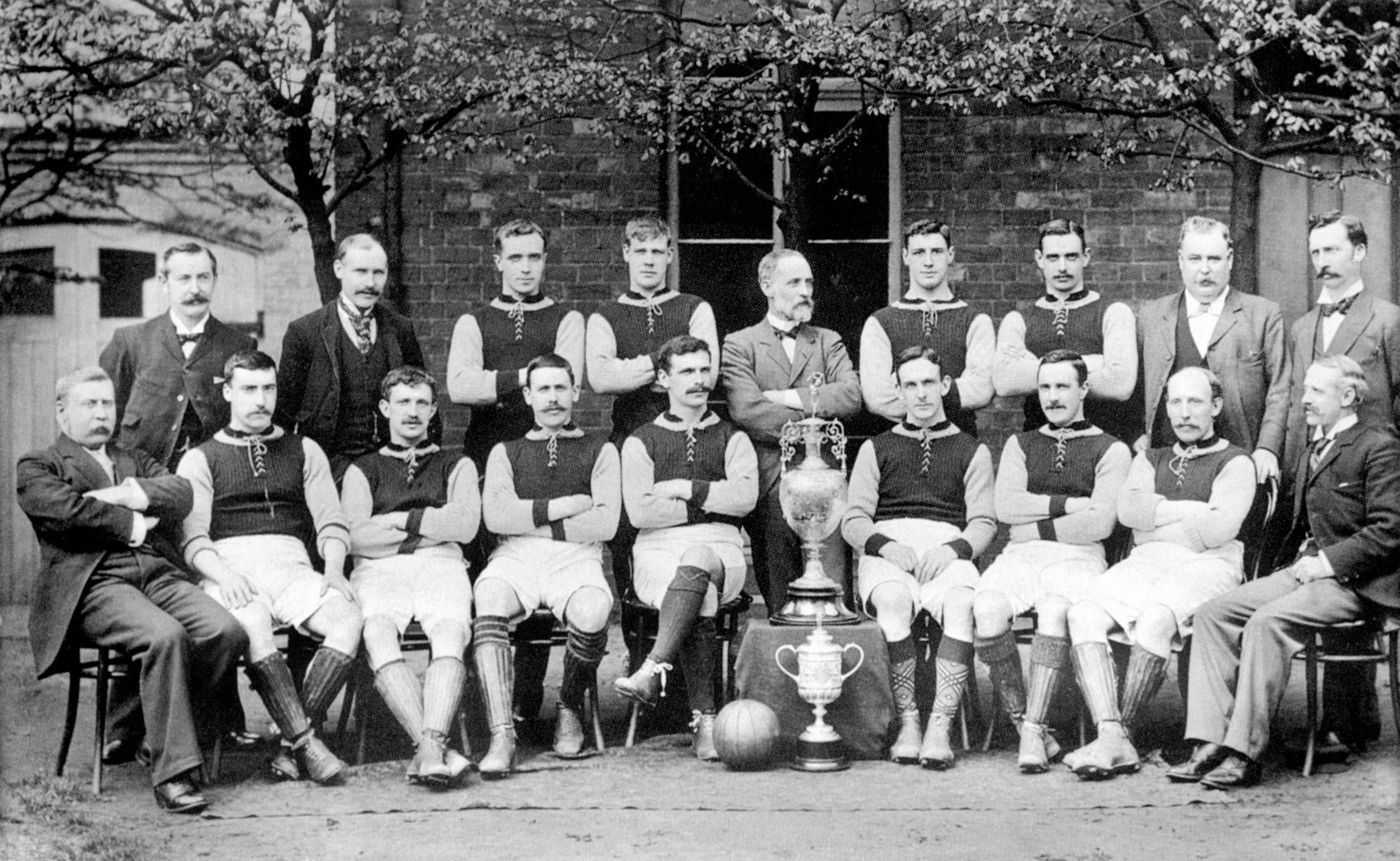
The Aston Villa team of 1896–97 with the First Division Championship and the FA Cup

Villa were attracting large crowds; the club could regularly expect 25,000 people to attend home games at a time when the FA Cup Final would attract only about 20,000. With poor spectator facilities and an uneven pitch, the Wellington Road ground was increasingly unsuitable, and in 1897, the year the club won the League and FA Cup Double, Villa's financial secretary Rinder negotiated the purchase of their current home ground, the Aston Lower Grounds. Villa achieved back-to-back league titles again in 1898-99 and 1899–1900, in the latter season Billy Garraty became the top goalscorer in world football scoring a total 30 goals in 39 league and cup games. The name of Villa Park was not used until about 1900. It came about through fan usage and no official declaration was made that listed the name as Villa Park. The ground was not purchased outright until 1911.

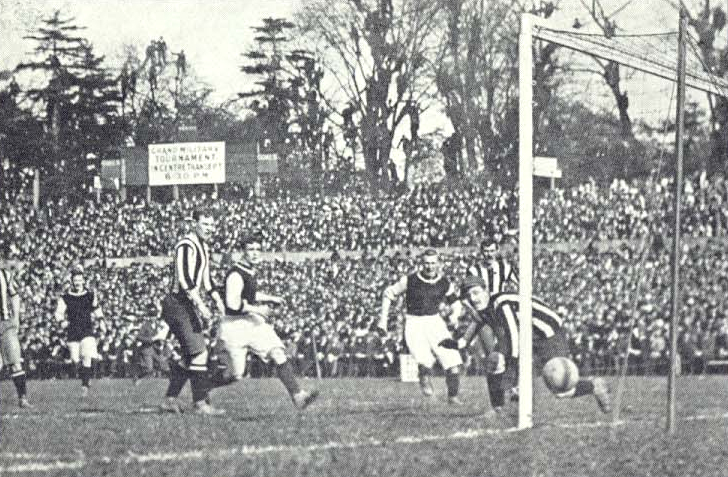
Harry Hampton scores in the 1905 FA Cup final.

Villa began the 20th century as champions but the gap that distinguished them from their competitors was diminishing. Football in England was becoming more competitive as more teams formed. Villa did remain a significant force in the game though. Despite a run of four victories at the start of the 1900–01 season, Villa finished fourth from bottom. In the 1902–03 season Villa won 12 of their last 15 games to finish only one point behind champions Sheffield Wednesday. In 1905, Villa won the FA Cup for the fourth time with a then record crowd of 101,117 watching the match at Crystal Palace, where Villa beat Newcastle United 2–0. In the same season, Villa finished fourth and this helped to boost the coffers at the club. After the success of 1905, Villa went through a barren patch and it was not until the 1909–10 season that Villa threatened to regain the title. In that season, they beat the reigning champions Manchester United 7–1. Villa won the championship for the first time in 10 years to take a then record, sixth title. The 1910–11 season was very close and the title was decided on the last day of the season when Villa lost to Liverpool and Manchester United beat Sunderland to take the title. The following season, Villa finished sixth. Yet in 1913, Villa won the FA Cup for a then record-equalling fifth time. By the end of what was to be called Villa's golden era, when the First World War began, the club had won the League Championship six times and the FA Cup five times. This included the League and Cup Double in 1896–97, a feat which would not be repeated for more than 60 years.

== Inter-war years ==
Football resumed after the war for the 1919–20 season and Villa won their sixth FA Cup at the end of season, beating Huddersfield Town 1–0 at Stamford Bridge. In November 1923, Villa's centre-half Tommy Ball was killed by his neighbour, thus becoming the only active Football League player to have been murdered. In their Golden Jubilee season of 1923–24, Villa got through to the second final to be held at the then new Wembley Stadium, where they lost 2–0 to Newcastle United. This Cup final was to be something of a pinnacle though as Villa then had League finishes of sixth and tenth in the following seasons. The Directors attempted to stop the slump with transfer dealings. In 1927, they bought both Jimmy Gibson and Eric Houghton. In 1928, they bought in one of the most prolific goalscorers to have ever played in the English football league. When Villa signed Tranmere Rovers striker Tom Waring for £4,700, he was relatively unknown. Waring scored a record 49 league goals in the 1930–31 season as Villa finished runners-up to Arsenal. One of the other purchases, Eric Houghton, scored 30 goals.

The team were playing well and scoring many goals. In the 1933–34 season, Villa had no fewer than fourteen full internationals and they continued to challenge for honours being second in the League in 1933. Yet this success did not last and the complacency at Villa Park led to a slump in form. This slump culminated in their relegation from the first tier of English football for the first time in their history in the 1935–36 season. The relegation coincided with the decision to appoint their first manager. Before the 1935–36 season, the team had been appointed by a committee and the team was coached by a "secretary" to the committee. The relegation though was largely due a dismal defensive record, they conceded 110 goals, 7 of them coming from Arsenal's Ted Drake in a 1–7 defeat at Villa Park. Villa came ninth in their first season in the Second tier of English football but they were crowned Second Division Champions in 1937–38 under the guidance of Jimmy Hogan. By the outbreak of the Second World War, Aston Villa were back in the top-flight of English football.

Their Aston Villa reserves (or seconds) team enlisted in the army and were captured at the Dunkirk evacuation in June 1940. In December in an Eastern German camp, a German Guard regiment challenged British prisoners of war to a game of football; the guards were being defeated 27–0 when they stopped the game, only then learning these prisoners were Aston Villa's second team.

== Post-war rebuilding ==
For Villa, as with all English clubs, the Second World War brought about the loss of seven seasons, and several careers were brought to a premature end by the conflict. The first game played at Villa Park after the cessation of hostilities was against Middlesbrough and Villa lost 1–0 in front of a crowd of 50,000. Aston Villa went about rebuilding the team, under the guidance of former player Alex Massie for the remainder of the 1940s. Massie made some bold signings in his time with the club, the first of which was 23-year-old Wales international Trevor Ford, who was bought from Swansea for £9,500 in 1946, when Villa finished eighth in the League. Ford would go on to score 60 times in his four seasons at Villa Park, before he was sold in the 1950–51 season to Sunderland for a then British record of £30,000 (£900,000 today).

For the remainder of the 1940s and early 1950s, Massie continued to bring in new players whilst the team regularly had mid-table finishes. One of the more influential signings was Danny Blanchflower in 1951 for £15,000. Villa had a good start to the 1951–52 season when, after eight games, Villa were second behind Manchester United. This was their best start of the last 19 years, and they eventually finished in sixth place. After a mid-table finish in the 1952–53 season, the following season, saw the return of Eric Houghton, this time in a managerial capacity. One of his first actions was to introduce 19–year–old Peter McParland to the first team. His first season in charge ended with Villa in 13th place. Nevertheless, "Houghton had done well to guide a transitional Villa team to a respectable position in the top flight." Under Houghton's stewardship, Villa won the 1957 FA Cup Final against Manchester United's celebrated Busby Babes. Peter McParland scored both goals in a 2–1 victory, in a record-equalling ninth FA Cup final. It was Aston Villa's first trophy for 37 years.

== Fluctuating fortunes ==
The success of the previous season proved to be something of a false dawn though, with the team finishing 14th, seven points above relegation. After refusing to resign, Eric Houghton was sacked when relegation seemed imminent in 1958–59. His successor Joe Mercer was unable to prevent the club being relegated in 1959, for only the second time in its history. The fact that Villa reached the semi-finals of the FA Cup only served to highlight the complacency that had set in at the club that led to Villa being relegated. Villa only spent one season in the Second Division, returning as Champions in 1960. The 1960–61 season was a successful one; it saw Villa reach the semi-finals of the FA Cup, finish ninth in the League, and win the inaugural League Cup. This was helped by the emergence of an exciting group of youth players, who became known as "Mercer's Minors".
