= Billy Mason (footballer) =

English footballer (1855–?)

William Bernard Mason (b. Feb 1855, Birmingham) was an English footballer notable for playing in Aston Villa's first ever FA Cup tie.

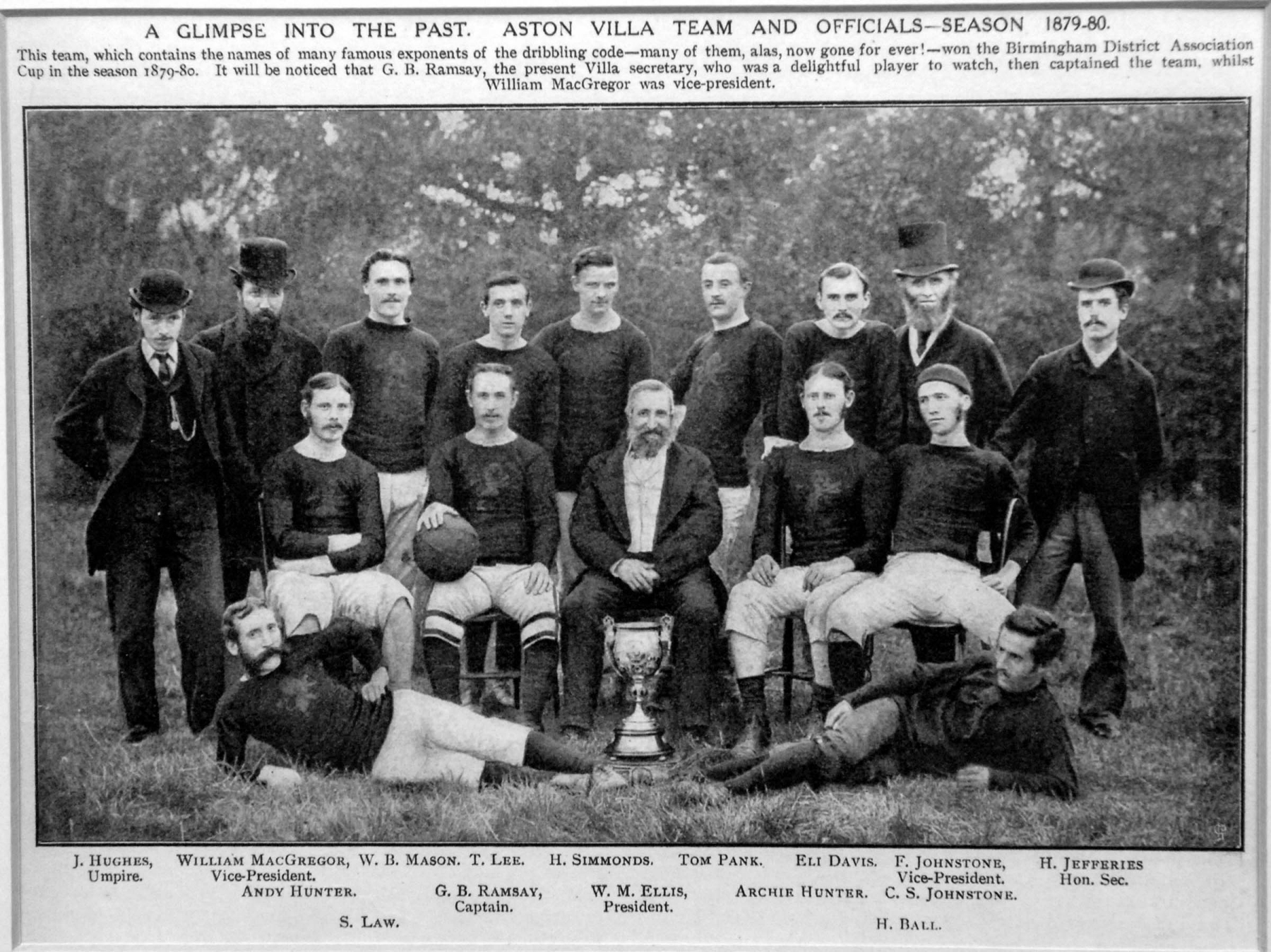
W.B. Mason, 3rd left, back row. Aston Villa 1879–80

In 1874 Mason was a member of the Aston Villa Wesleyan Chapel. Their Bible meetings consisted around 200 young men some of whom had set up a cricket team. The cricketers were keen to find an outlet for their energy in the off-season, they were initially undecided between rugby and association football and, as Mason was playing with the Adderley Park Grasshoppers rugby team, four other members, W.H. Price, William Scattergood, Jack Hughes and George Matthews, were tasked with watching him play. Grasshoppers were to play the Handsworth rugby club at Heathfield Park so the four attended the match. Having watched the game, the four men returned along Heathfield Road. They adjourned beneath a dim gas light near Villa Cross and between themselves agreed rugby was a little too rough and that they would play association football. The gas lamp meeting is traditionally held as the birth of Aston Villa Football Club.

Co-founder Hughes' view was that Aston Villa Football Club was really formed later by the players who attended the first kick-about on waste ground on Westminster Road, now the RCCG Salvation Theatre. They hired a football for 1s 6d (roughly 1/3 the daily wage) from Clapshaw & Cleave. The sixteen then each contributed a shilling and elected Price as their first captain and Charlie H. Midgley as club secretary. H H Hartshorne president of the chapel's bible class was the football club's first President. In January 1875 Aston Villa played their first recorded game against Aston Park Unity. Matthews was captain and Price, Hughes and Scattergood also played. German full-back, Billy Weis became the club's first foreign player. Only two of the players, Ted Lee and Billy Mason, would go on to represent Villa in their first FA Cup campaign. Aston Park Unity won 1-0.

The second match, Aston Villa's first-ever victory, was arranged against the members' friends and cricket opponents at Aston, St Mary's. James Wilson allowed the game to be played at his building plots on Wilson Road, Birchfield. Aston Villa Football Club played in scarlet and royal blue hooped shirts, white shorts and royal blue caps and stockings. The club rules stated "No member can take place in a match unless in the above uniform". St Mary's played rugby so a compromise was reached whereby, using the round ball, Villa played rugby in the first half and soccer in the second. Under the Sheffield Rules up to fifteen players were allowed at the time. St Mary's rugby football club had been founded by future Villa player & director, Charlie Johnstone. In later years he reminisced "Hack him down - sit on his head, was the cry for one half the game, and You must not collar-charge him, was yelled for the other". Scattergood kept goal; the full-backs were Price, Weis and Fred J. Knight; half-backs were Midgely, Ted Lee, Harry and George Matthews; forwards: Hughes, Mason, William Sothers, Wiiliam Such, Harry Whately, George Page, and Alfred Robbins. After a goalless first-half, Hughes scored the only goal off the rebound when the goal-keeper spilled his first effort. In a newspaper article, almost fifty years later, in March 1924, Hughes was insistent that this was Villa's first match and had occurred on the third Saturday of March 1874. However a report of the event was published in Birmingham Morning News on 16 March 1875.

When Aston Villa Cricket Club beat Victoria Cross 65-15 in May 1876, opener Mason scored 8 runs.

The 1879–80 football season saw Aston Villa's entry into top flight competitive association football with their first tie in the FA Cup. The start of the official record was Saturday 13 December 1879 when Villa faced Stafford Road F.C., of the Stafford Road railway works, Wolverhampton. The match was played before a crowd of 2,000 at Stafford's Half-Way House Ground. In 2024, celebrating the club's 150th anniversary, Aston Villa Legacy Numbers were introduced indexing every first-team player who had represented the club in a competitive fixture. Although playing before shirt numbers were introduced in 1926, Goalkeeper John Ball received Legacy Number 1. Inside-forward Billy Mason received Legacy Number #9, Andy Hunter #4 officially became Villa's first goal-scorer in the 1–1 draw.

The replay was held at Villa's Wellington Road ground on 24 January 1880 with inside-forward George Ramsay #12 replacing Charlie Johnstone. Villa defeated Stafford Road 3–1. Mason scored a brace with Sammy Law getting the third goal. The match proved to be Mason's last match for Villa as the 24-year-old was free-transferred to Wednesbury Town.
