= Jack Hughes (footballer, born 1852) =

Founder of Aston Villa Football Club

John Hughes (born 1852) was an English footballer who was one of the 'Four Founding Fathers' of Aston Villa Football Club and the scorer of their first goal.

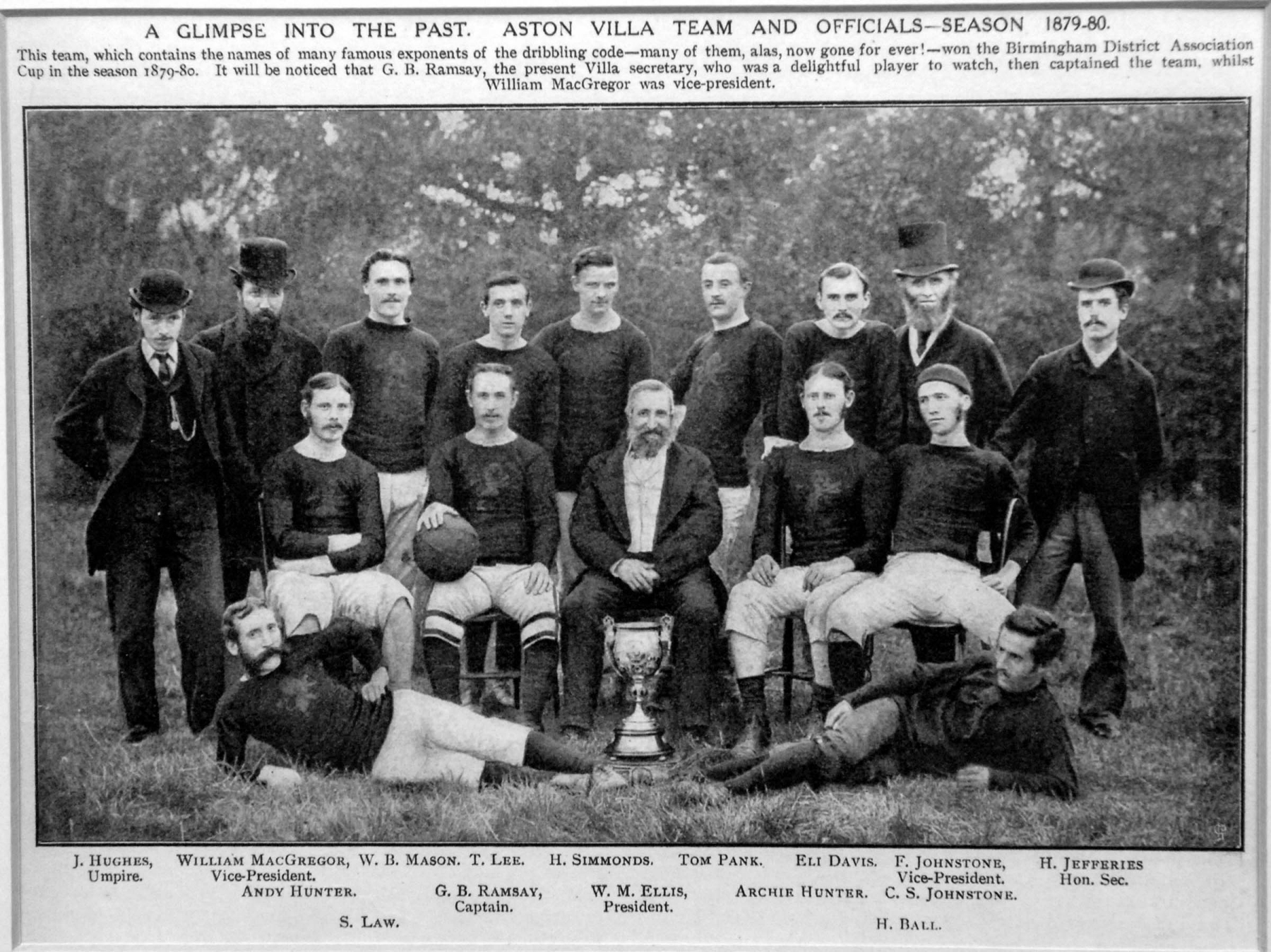
J. Hughes, 1st left, back row. Aston Villa 1879–80

In 1873 Hughes was a member of the Aston Villa Wesleyan Chapel. According to him their Bible meetings consisted around 200 young men some of whom had set up the Aston Villa cricket team. On 28 June 1873, Aston Villa Cricket Club played Wellington at Aston Park. They were defeated 59–49. Opening the batting, co-founder W.H. Price scored four while Hughes managed just a single run. Co-founder George Matthews too scored but a single with the bat. Co-founder, William Scattergood excelled for Villa, scoring 15 not out. Against Aston St Mary's in July openers Hughes and Price made four runs each, Scattergood 20 with Matthews out for a duck. On 11 July against Small Heath Zingari, Hughes took one wicket but made just three runs. Aston Villa were not the only team to carry the name. In 1874 and 1875 the newspapers carried reports covering a rival cricket team, Aston Villa United.

The cricketers were keen to find an outlet for their energy in the off-season, they were initially undecided between rugby and association football but one member, W.B. Mason, was playing with the Adderley Park Grasshoppers rugby team and four of the cricketers, Hughes, Scattergood, Price and Matthews, were tasked with watching him play. Grasshoppers were to play the Handsworth rugby club at Heathfield Park so the four attended the match. Having watched the game, the four men returned along Heathfield Road. They adjourned beneath a dim gaslit lamp near Villa Cross and between themselves agreed rugby was a little too rough and that they would play association football. The gas lamp meeting, dated to 21 November 1874, is traditionally held as the birth of Aston Villa Football Club.

Hughes' view was that Aston Villa Football Club was really formed later by the players who attended the first kick-about on waste ground on Westminster Road now the RCCG Salvation Theatre. They hired a football for 1s 6d (roughly 1/3 the daily wage) from the Birmingham sports equipment manufacturer, Clapshaw & Cleave. The sixteen then each contributed a shilling and elected the first captain, W.H. Price, and secretary Charlie H. Midgley. H H Hartshorne president of the chapel's bible class was the football club's first President. In January 1875 Aston Villa played their first recorded game against Aston Park Unity. Matthews was captain and Price, Hughes and Scattergood also played. German full-back, Billy Weis became the club's first foreign player. Only two of the players, Ted Lee and Billy Mason, would go on to represent Villa in their first FA Cup campaign. Aston Park Unity won 1-0.

An early match was arranged against the members' friends and cricket opponents of Aston, St Mary's. James Wilson allowed the game to be played at his building plots on Wilson Road, Birchfield. Aston Villa Football Club played in scarlet and royal blue hooped shirts, white shorts and royal blue caps and stockings. The club rules stated "No member can take place in a match unless in the above uniform". St Mary's played rugby so a compromise was made whereby, using the round ball, Villa played rugby in the first half and soccer in the second. Under the Sheffield Rules up to fifteen players were allowed at the time. In later years, St Mary's Charlie Johnstone reminisced "Hack him down - sit on his head, was the cry for one half the game, and You must not collar-charge him, was yelled for the other". Scattergood kept goal; the full-backs were Price, William Weis and Fred J. Knight; half-backs were Midgely, Ted Lee, Harry and George Matthews; forwards: Hughes, Mason, William Sothers, Wiiliam Such, Harry Whately, George Page, and Alfred Robbins. After a goalless first-half, Hughes scored the only goal off the rebound when the goal-keeper spilled his first effort. In a newspaper article, almost fifty years later, in March 1924, Hughes was insistent that the match had occurred on the third Saturday of March 1874. However a report of the event was published in Birmingham Morning News on 16 March 1875.

Hughes was Aston Villa's umpire in the 1879–80 season the last season before a referee would be appointed before the match. Originally team captains would consult each other in order to resolve any dispute on the pitch. Eventually this role was delegated to an umpire. Each team would bring their own partisan umpire allowing the team captains to concentrate on the game. In 1881, the referee, a third "neutral" official was added; this referee would be "referred to" if the umpires could not resolve a dispute. The referee did not take his place on the pitch until 1891, when the umpires became linesmen (now assistant referees).

In 2014, in front of the Holte Suite, the Founding Lamp was unveiled, a three-metre structure set on a plinth with brass plates commemorating the story of Hughes, Scattergood, Matthews and Price.
