= 1875–76 Aston Villa F.C. season =

Aston Villa
1874–75 season
- Secretary: C. H. Midgley

The 1875–76 English football season was Aston Villa's second season, thirteen years before the creation of the Football League. Originally team captains would consult each other in order to resolve any dispute on the pitch. This role was now delegated to an umpire. Each team would bring their own partisan umpire allowing the team captains to concentrate on the game.

Aston Villa Football Club played in scarlet and royal blue hooped shirts, white shorts and royal blue caps and stockings. The club rules stated "No member can take place in a match unless in the above uniform".

== Friendlies ==
1 January 1876	Aston Villa	v	Aston Park Unity	Aston Park
Note: On 1 January 1875 Aston Villa played Aston Park Unity. Aston Park had become available to the public for recreation, and this led to several new clubs being founded in the district, sharing the footballing areas. In addition to Aston Park Unity, Aston Villa competed for space with Aston Harold, Excelsior, St George's F.C. and shorter-lived outfits.

29 January 1876	Walsall Albion	3–0	Aston Villa	Walsall
3:15 pm	R. Jeffries (2), o.g.
Note: Jack Hughes was captain. Notable players included William Scattergood and Ted Lee.

5 February 1876	Aston Park Unity	v	Aston Villa	Aston Park
			Goal
Note:

12 February 1876	Aston Villa	0–1	Walsall Albion	Aston Park
3:30 pm		Football Walsall Observer 19 February 1876	F. Evans
