= Billy Mason =

Billy Mason may refer to:

- Billy Mason (footballer)
- Billy Mason (performer)
