= List of windmills in Warwickshire =

This is a list of windmills in the English county of Warwickshire.

== Locations ==
Location	Name of mill and grid reference	Type	Maps	First mention or built	Last mention or demise	Photograph
Allesley				1325	1325	
Ardens Grafton			1796	1571	1796	
Atherstone				1753	1573	
Attleborough	Quarry Farm Mill; SP 378 901	Tower		Early 19th century	1944	
Austrey				1252	1252	
Austrey	SK 300 062	Post		1824	Demolished c. 1905	
Austrey	SK 302 072	Tower		18th century	Demolished c. 1915	
Avon Dassett				1284	1284	
Avon Dassett	SP 412 502	Post		1725	Demolished 1924	
Baxterley	Common Mill; SP 280 968	Post		1793	Demolished c. 1969	
Berkswell	Balsall Common Mill; SP 249 759	Tower		1826	Windmill World	
Berkswell	Bradnock's Marsh Mill; SP 216 798	Tower		Early 19th century	Truncated c. 1900	
Binley				1291	1291	
Birdingbury	SP 432 678	Post		1675	Demolished late 19th century	
Birmingham	SP 067 862				Demolished c. 1745	
Birmingham	Holloway Head Mill; Chapman's Mill; SP 067 862	Tower		1745	Demolished 1873 or 1878	
Birmingham	Deritend Heath, Cooper's mill	Smock	1731	1731	1836	
Birmingham	Birmingham Heath	Smock	1722; 1800	1722	Demolished 1849	
Birmingham	Speedwell Mill			1810	1810	
Birmingham	Baskerville's Mill	Tower		Mid-18th century post 1745	1789	
Birmingham	Soho Mill, Handsworth				Gone by 1749	
Birmingham	Hutton's Mill, Handsworth			1759	Demolished late 19th century	
Birmingham	Hamstead Mill, Handsworth				gone by 1682	
Birmingham	Greet Mill; Red Hill Mill; Yardley Mill, Greet	Post	1725	1668	1800	
Birmingham	Lea Hall Mill; Bach Mill, Yardley	Post	1800^{*}	1800	1800	
Birmingham	North of Over Mill (watermill), Erdington			1833	1833	
Birmingham	North west of Dwarfeholes Mill (watermill), Erdington			1833	1833	
Birmingham	Wake Green Mill, Moseley	Post		1664	1819, gone by 1834	
Birmingham	Saltley Mill, Saltley	Post	1722; 1725; 1731; 1755	1722	1755, gone by 1760	
Birmingham	Edgbaston Mill, Edgbaston		1822	1810	1822, gone by 1834	
Birmingham	Bristnall's End Mill				gone by 1794 The road from the Aston Villa house to Bristnall's End was named Heathfield Road	
Birmingham	Holdford Mill		1834	1834	1843	
Birmingham	Bleak Hills Mill, Aston			1814	1834	
Birmingham	Slade Mill, Aston				gone by 18th century	
Bishop's Itchington				1279	1602	
Bishop's Tachbrook				1557	1557	
Bretford				1279	1360	
Bulkington	Weston Mill			1277	1710	
Bulkington	Marston Jabet Mill			1590	1590	
Burton Dassett	Le Stonmilne			1367	1367	
Burton Dassett	Beacon Mill; SP 394 521	Tower		Late 15th century	Windmill World	
Burton Dassett	Northend Mill; SP 394 521	Post		1664	Blown down 26 July 1946	
Caldecote				1794	1794	
Chapel Ascote				1294	1341	
Chapel Ascote				1547	1547	
Chesterton	Chesterton Mill; SP 349 593	Tower		1632	Windmill World	
Chilvers Coton				1556	1556	
Church Lawford				1535	1535	
Claverdon		Post		1803	Moved to Shrewley 1832	
Coleshill	Cole End Mill; SP 198 891	Tower		1783	Demolished early 20th century	
Corley	Corley Moor Mill; SP 283 850	Post		c. 1800	Demolished 1890s	
Coventry	Foleshill Mill			1682	1822	
Coventry	Sowe Mill			1291	Late 14th century	
Coventry	Radford Road			1411	1411	
Coventry	Spon Street			1411	1749	
Coventry	Outside the New Gate			1583	1583	
Coventry	Whitley Common			1722	1725	
Coventry	Whitley Common (2nd mill)			1725	1725	
Coventry	Stivichall			1725	1725	
Coventry	Hearshall Common			1716	1725	
Coventry	Whitley Common			1740	1740	
Coventry	Wasting's Mill			1807	1807	
Cubbington				1355	1355	
Cubbington		Post		1860	Demolished 1870	
Dorridge	Bentley Heath Mill; SP 166 758	Tower		c. 1830	1925	
Dunchurch	West Heath Mill			1547	1547	
Exhall	Hall Green Mill; SP 351 855	Tower		18th century	Truncated c. 1923, demolished late 1960s	
Fenny Compton				1655	1655	
Fenny Compton	Mill Hill Mill; SP 421 521	Post		18th century	Collapsed 24 March 1895	
Fenny Compton		Post		1655	Demolished 1820s	
Fillongley	Corley Moor Mill; SP 276 849	Tower		Early 19th century	Windmill World	
Frankton				1291	1291	
Grandborough	Woolscott			1668	1668	
Grandborough	Woolscott Mill; SP 507 692	Tower		c. 1820	1925	
Harbury				1279	1291	
Harbury	(2nd mill)			1279	1291	
Harbury	(3rd mill)			1291	1291	
Harbury	Harbury Mill; SP 372 600	Tower		1812	Windmill World	
Hillmorton					Offered for sale in 1853	
Idlicote				1279	1279	
Ilmington				1295	1697	
Kenilworth	Tainter's Hill Mill; SP 290 728	Tower		1778	Converted to water tower Windmill World	
Kineton	(two mills)			1279	1565	
Kineton	Pittern Hill Mill; SP 325 517	Tower		Late 18th century	Windmill World	
Kings Norton	Weather Oak Hill Mill					
Kings Norton	Headley Heath Mill					
Ladbroke				Early 13th century	Early 13th century	
Leamington Spa	Whitnash Road Mill; Tachbrook Road Mill; SP 318 639	Tower		c. 1777	Demolished 1968	
Lighthorne				1316	1627	
Little Compton	SP 270 291			1885	Demolished early 20th century	
Long Itchington				1347	1353	
Marton		Post			Moved within Marton mid-19th century	
Marton	SP 415 683	Post		Mid-19th century	Demolished c. 1907	
Meriden					Demolished post July 1811	
Moreton Morrell				1604	1604	
Monks Kirby	Kirby Mill			1291	1721	
Monks Kirby	Cesters Over Mill			1545	1545	
Napton-on-the-Hill	SP 458 613			1543	1543	
Napton-on-the-Hill	Napton Mill; SP 458 613	Tower		c. 1835	Windmill World	
Newbold Revel				1538	1593	
Newton Regis				1285	1285	
Northfield	Middleton Hall Mill				gone by 1722	
Northfield	Shenley Fields Mill			1692	1692	
Norton Lindsey	Norton Lindsey Mill; SP 224 632	Tower		c. 1795	Windmill World	
Nuneaton	Tuttle Hill Mill; SP 340 933	Tower		1821	Windmill World	
Pailton				1587	1587	
Packwood	Fullard's Mill; SP 170 736	Tower		Late 18th century	Windmill World	
Pillerton Priors				1552	1565	
Quinton	Lower Quinton Mill; SP 176 473	Tower		Early 19th century	Demolished spring 1951	
Quinton	Ridgacre Mill				gone by 1722	
Ratley	Edge Hill Mill; SP 371 470	Post		1561	1697	
Ratley	Edge Hill Mill; SP 371 470	Post		Early 19th century	Demolished 1916	
Ratley	Ratley Grange Mill	Post		1789	Demolished c. 1900	
Rowington	Bouncing Bess; SP 205 705	Tower		1789	Windmill World	
Rugby	Hillmorton Mill; SP 541 735	Tower		Late 18th century	Demolished 1899	
Sheldon	Lyndon Green Mill				gone by 18th century	
Sheldon	Wells Green Mill	Post		1675	Demolished early 18th century, gone by 1725	
Sheldon	Sheldon Mill	Post		1788	1840	
Shrewley	Justice; SP 219 682	Tower		Late 18th century	Demolished 1949	
Shrewley	Pinchem; SP 218 681	Post		1832	Collapsed 1937	
Snitterfield	Black Hill Mill; SP 230 591	Tower		Late 18th century	1893	
Solihull	Copt Heath Mill; SP 174 785	Tower		Late 18th century	Demolished early 20th century	
Solihull	Olton End Mill; SP 152 813	Midlands post		Mid-19th century	Demolished c. 1900	
Solihull	Hasluck's Green Mill; Solihull Lodge Mill; SP 101 788	Tower		Late 18th century	Demolished September 1957	
Southam	Old Mill; SP 413 622	Tower		c. 1800	Burnt down 1849	
Southam	Old Mill; SP 413 622	Tower		1849	1948, truncated by 1955; Windmill World	
Stockton				1356	1526	
Stockton	Rugby Road Mill; SP 435 643	Post		Mid-18th century	Demolished April 1914	
Stockton	Rugby Road Mill; SP 436 642	Tower		c. 1865	Demolished c. 1923	
Sutton Coldfield	Maney Hill Mill			1309	1309	
Sutton Coldfield	Langley Mill				gone by 1722	
Sutton Coldfield	High Heat Mill	Post	1750; 1755	1725	1755, gone by 1788	
Tanworth-in-Arden	Danzey Green Mill; SP 129 692	Midlands Post		1810	Dismantled 1969, re-erected at Avoncroft Museum of Historic Buildings in 1975.	
Thurlaston	Thurlaston Mill; SP 469 710	Tower		1794	Windmill World	
Tysoe				14th century	15th century	
Tysoe	Upper Tysoe Mill; Compton Wynyates Mill; SP 331 426	tower		Early 18th century	Windmill World	
Tysoe	Middle Tysoe Mill; SP 336 445	Post		1752	Blown down 1913	
Ufton				1291	1291	
Warmington	SP 407 476	Post		17th century	Demolished c. 1910	
Warton	Warton Mill; SK 286 031	Midlands Post		Early 19th century	Demolished c. 1923	
Willey				1376	1376	
Wolfhamcote				1587	1687	
Wolvey				1553	1604	
Wolvey	SP 439 883	Post		c. 1820	1901	
Wooton Wawen				Early 17th century	Early 17th century	
Wooton Wawen	Edstone House Mill; SP 181 612	tower		1725	Demolished c. 1912	

== Maps ==
- 1722 Henry Beighton
- 1725 Henry Beighton
- 1731 Samuel & Nathaniel Buck, South-west prospect of Birmingham
- 1755 Thomas Jeffrey
- 1792 Sheriff
- 1800 Taylor
- 1800^{*} Taylor (map of Worcestershire)
- 1822 Greenwood
- 1834 Ordnance Survey

== Notes ==
Mills in bold are still standing, known building dates are indicated in bold. Text in italics denotes indicates that the information is not confirmed, but is likely to be the case stated.

== Sources ==
Unless otherwise indicated, the source for all entries is:-Seaby, Wilfred A, and Smith, Arthur C (1977). Windmills in Warwickshire. Warwick: Warwickshire Museum. ISBN 0-9504239-8-X. or the linked Windmill World page.
