= Ufton Fields =

Nature reserve in Warwickshire, England

Coordinates: 52.250°N 1.445°W

Ufton Fields SSSI
Area of Search	United Kingdom
Grid Reference	SP378615
Interest	Wildlife
Area	West Midlands
Notification	1981

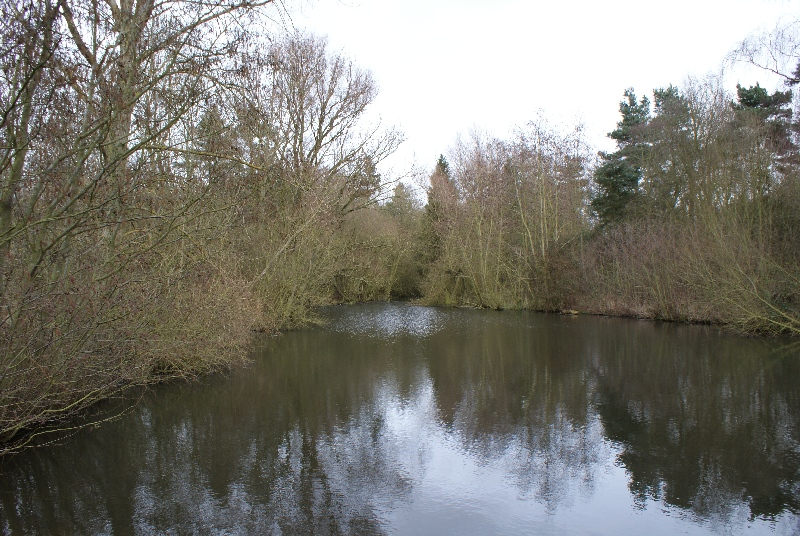
One of the pools.

Ufton Fields is a biological Site of Special Scientific Interest and local nature reserve in Warwickshire, England. It is situated on the A425 close to the village of Ufton, between Southam and Leamington Spa. The reserve is owned by Warwickshire County Council and is administered and run by the Warwickshire Wildlife Trust. It covers an area of 77 acres (31 ha).

== History ==
The site was originally agricultural, but in the 1950s had a change of use to quarrying, when Portland Cement (later Blue Circle Cement) began extracting limestone for use in cement making. After quarrying ceased, the site was handed over to Warwickshire County Council in 1972. It became a local nature reserve before gaining SSSI status in 1981.

== Habitats ==
The site has a wide variety of habitats, ranging from grassland and woodland to ponds and pools. The site originally gained its status due to its abundance of invertebrates, especially butterflies. The site permits access for dogs.

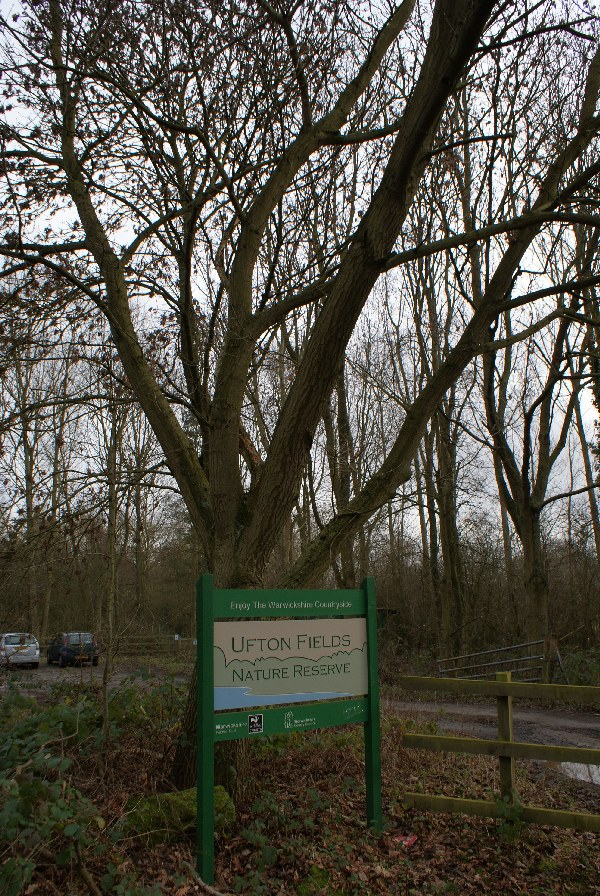
Entrance to the site
