= Charles Geach =

English banker, founder of Midland Bank

- Born: 1808; St. Austell, Cornwall, England, United Kingdom
- Died: 1 November 1854 (aged 45–46)
- Occupations: Businessman; industrialist; banker; politician
- Known for: Co-founder and General Manager of Midland Bank

Charles Geach (1808 – 1 November 1854) was an English businessman, industrialist, banker, and politician of the early to mid-19th century, strongly associated with banking and manufacturing interests. He was a co-founder and the first general manager of the Midland Bank, the first treasurer of the Institution of Mechanical Engineers, a prominent investor in several major engineering businesses, and an MP for Coventry from 1851 to his premature death, aged 46, in 1854.

== Banking career ==
Geach was born in St Austell, Cornwall, and through family connections in Penryn secured a junior position at the Bank of England. A diligent employee, he was selected to establish a branch of the bank in Birmingham in 1826. He became well-known and trusted in the city, helping establish two new banks, but despite his efforts to establish the first, the Town and District Bank, founded on 1 July 1836, he was not appointed manager.

Almost simultaneously, however, when local businessmen believed the Birmingham Joint Stock Bank needed a rival they approached then 28-year-old Geach to be its first general manager. Founded on 22 August 1836 and initially based in Union Street, the joint-stock company's starting capital was a very modest £28,000, but the Birmingham & Midland Bank quickly proved to be a successful enterprise, eventually acquiring two private banks in 1851; purchase of the 'Stourbridge Old Bank' of Bate and Robbins provided the Birmingham and Midland Bank's first branch.

Increasingly courted by regional commercial and manufacturing business people, Geach became a prominent Midlands figure, elected an alderman in Birmingham in 1843–44 and mayor in 1847, and was elected to Parliament as MP for Coventry in 1851, whereupon he resigned as general manager of the Midland Bank.

== Manufacturing ==
Geach also invested in various businesses, becoming a partner in several firms that would capitalise upon the railway boom, including: the Patent Shaft and Axletree Works, at Wednesbury, of which he eventually became sole partner in 1844; the Woodside Iron Works and Foundry (later Cochrane & Co), near Dudley; and the Park Gate Iron and Steel Company, Rotherham with Samuel Beale; he also became engaged in railway contracts, being a director of the Manchester, Sheffield and Lincolnshire Railway, and the Shrewsbury and Birmingham Railway companies. Only his premature death prevented another potentially lucrative investment in Beyer, Peacock and Company.

He successfully promoted the Woodside Foundry to be the principal supplier of cast-iron framework for The Crystal Palace building for The Great Exhibition in Hyde Park, London in 1851, and later became managing director of the Crystal Palace when it was relocated to Sydenham.

He also invested in Isambard Kingdom Brunel's iron ship, the SS Great Eastern, and was an associate member of the Institution of Civil Engineers from 1850. On 27 January 1847, he was one of the founder members of the Institution of Mechanical Engineers ("original member No. 16") when it was established at a meeting in the Queen's Hotel next to Curzon Street railway station in Birmingham, and was elected as the IMechE's first Treasurer, serving until at least 1853.

== Political career ==
Politically a Whig, Geach was a strenuous supporter of free trade doctrines and the Anti-Corn Law League, and was regarded as liberal in tendency. Having entered Parliament on 8 April 1851, he stood in the 1852 general election and was returned in spite of a strong opposition. He attended regularly, but rarely spoke at length. He made his maiden speech on 2 May 1851, and the last of 37 contributions was on 4 August 1854.

== Personal life ==
In January 1832 Geach married Eliza Lucy Skally, daughter of John Skally, who kept the Aston Villa school at Villa Cross. Geach set up home in Aston Villa, the house on the junction of Heathfield Road and Lozells Lane (later the site of the Villa Cross Tavern). He later moved to Midland Bank premises on Union Street, where he lived for about ten years, moving in about 1846, to Wheeleys Hill (now Wheeleys Road), Edgbaston, and then to a large mansion at Chad Hill. As an MP, he lived the last years of his life mainly in London, occupying a house at 9 Park Street, Westminster.

Long hours in Parliament were believed to have damaged Geach's health. In 1854, he suffered a gastric illness, from which, upon prorogation of the House and some weeks of relaxation in Scotland, he appeared to recover, but on return to London, the chronic diarrhoea returned along with a painful infection to his right leg—said to be "the after effects of a kick from a hansom cab horse". He died on 1 November 1854, aged 46, leaving a widow and four children.

Parliament of the United Kingdom
Preceded by Edward Ellice; George James Turner	Member of Parliament for Coventry; 1851–1854; With: Edward Ellice	Succeeded by Edward Ellice; Sir Joseph Paxton
