= St Mary's Church, Aston Brook =

St Mary’s Church, Aston Brook
- St Mary’s Church, Aston Brook
- 52°29′47.3″N 1°53′6.4″W
- OS grid reference: SP 07896 88734
- Location: Aston
- Country: England
- Denomination: Church of England

History
- Dedication: St Mary the Virgin

Architecture
- Architect: James Murray
- Completed: 1863
- Demolished: 1970s

St Mary's Church, Aston Brook is a former parish church in the Church of England in Birmingham. The church was demolished in 1972.

The church was built in 1863 to designs of the architect James Murray. It was consecrated by Henry Philpott, Bishop of Worcester, on Thursday 10 December 1863. The tower was added in 1882. The church was equipped with a two manual pipe organ by Norman and Beard. A specification of the organ can be found on the National Pipe Organ Register.

In 1864, a parish was formed out of the parishes of St. Peter and St. Paul, Aston, St Silas’ Church, Lozells, and St Matthew's Church, Duddeston. The church opened a school for girls and infants in 1868.

== Aston Brook St Mary's ==
The church was noted for having a cricket team. They regularly played cricket, amongst others, against the Wesleyan Chapel at Villa Cross, Lozells. The cricketers were keen to find an outlet for their energy in the off-season. This was organised by a young Scot named Charlie Johnstone who had played rugby at Montrose Academy. A rugby ball was obtained from Clapshaw & Cleave on Edmund Street and they negotiated a two-year tenancy in the lower ground of Aston Park, beside the soccer club, Aston Unity who later played on the higher ground.

In the 1874-75 season their Methodist friends and cricket opponents arranged a football match challenging St Mary's. Aston Brook played rugby so a compromise was made whereby, using a round ball, the teams played rugby in the first half and soccer in the second. In later years Johnstone reminisced "Hack him down - sit on his head, was the cry for one half the game, and You must not collar-charge him, was yelled for the other". James Wilson allowed the game to be played at his building plots on Wilson Road, Birchfield.

St Mary's opponents, Aston Villa Football Club, played in scarlet and royal blue hooped shirts, white shorts and royal blue caps and stockings. Under the Sheffield Rules up to fifteen players were allowed at the time. Yeomans and Perry played well for St Mary's. For Villa, Scattergood kept goal; the full-backs were Walter Price, William Weis and Fred J. Knight; half-backs were Ted Lee, Charles Midgely, Harry and George Matthews; forwards: Hughes, Mason, William Sothers, Wiiliam Such, Harry Whately, George Page, and Alfred Robbins. After a goalless first-half, Aston Villa's Hughes scored the only goal off the rebound when the goalkeeper spilled his first effort. In a newspaper article, almost fifty years later, in March 1924, Hughes was insistent this was Aston Villa Football Club's first match which had occurred on the third Saturday of March 1874. However a report of the event was published in Birmingham Morning News on 16 March 1875.
