= St Saviour's Church, Hockley =

St Saviour’s Church, Hockley
- St Saviour’s Church, Hockley
- 52°29′42.7″N 1°54′36.1″W
- OS grid reference: SP 06107 88632
- Location: Birmingham
- Country: England
- Denomination: Church of England

History
- Dedication: St Saviour
- Consecrated: 1 May 1874

Architecture
- Architect: J A Chatwin
- Completed: 1874
- Construction cost: £5,200
- Closed: 1967

Specifications
- Capacity: 600 persons
- Length: 85 feet (26 m)
- Width: 43 feet (13 m)
- Height: 126 feet (38 m)

St Saviour's Church, Villa Street, Hockley is a former Church of England parish church in Birmingham.

== History ==
The church was designed by J. A. Chatwin and the contractor was W. Partridge of Monument Lane, Birmingham. It was consecrated on 2 May 1874 by the Bishop of Worcester. The church consisted of a 5 bay nave, north and south aisles, chancel, and a west end tower and spire, reaching to a height of 126 ft.

A parish was assigned out of St Matthias' Church, Farm Street, Birmingham.

In 1967 the parish was united with St Silas’ Church, Lozells, and the church was demolished
