= 1874–75 in English football =

Football in England
- Season: 1874–75

Men's football
- FA Cup: Royal Engineers

The 1874–75 season was the fourth season of competitive football in England at a time when the sport was still the recreation for the higher classes in the country. The growth of football in England started with the formation of clubs from these elites and a period of Codification (1801 to 1891). Early clubs were Darwen and Turton in Lancashire. Football progressed mainly through education systems that encouraged young men to pursue playing the sport and create their own clubs post graduation.

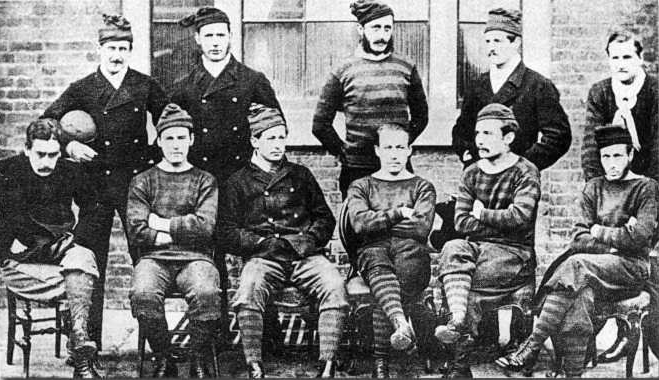
Royal Engineers A.F.C. in 1872: early exponents of the "combination game"

In 1874, Charles W. Alcock coined the term "combination game" for a style of play that was based on teamwork and co-operation, largely achieved by passing the ball instead of dribbling it.

Aston Villa Football Club were formed in November 1874 by members of the Aston Villa Wesleyan Chapel. The founders were members of the chapel's cricket team looking for a way to stay fit during the winter months.

== National team ==
England and Scotland met again in a 2–2 draw at the Kennington Oval

Date	Score	Opponent	Comp	England scorers	Scottish scorers
6 March 1875	2–2	Scotland	F	Charles Wollaston (Wanderers) (5 mins) & C. W. Alcock (Wanderers) (70 mins)	Peter Andrews, Henry McNeil

== Honours ==
Competition	Winner
FA Cup	Royal Engineers
