= Holte School =

Location
- Wheeler Street; Lozells; Birmingham, West Midlands, B19 2EP; England
- 52.5002°N 1.9006°W

Information
- Type: Community school
- Local authority: Birmingham City Council
- Department for Education URN: 103509 Tables
- Ofsted: Reports
- Headteacher: Simon Adams
- Gender: Mixed
- Age: 11 to 18
- Enrolment: 1,225 as of April 2022
- Website: http://www.holte.bham.sch.uk/

Holte School is a mixed secondary school and sixth form located in the Lozells area of Birmingham, in the West Midlands of England.

It is a non-selective community school administered by Birmingham City Council. Holte School offers GCSEs and BTECs as programmes of study for pupils, while students in the sixth form have the option to study from a range of A-levels and further BTECs.

The school shares its site with the Holte Visual and Performing Arts College (a secondary school partnered with the Birmingham City University), which was threatened with closure in 2011.
