= St Matthias' Church, Farm Street, Birmingham =

St Matthias Church, Farm Street, Birmingham
- St Matthias Church, Farm Street, Birmingham
- 52°29′46.4″N 1°54′13.5″W
- Location: Birmingham
- Country: England
- Denomination: Church of England

History
- Dedication: St Matthias
- Consecrated: 5 June 1856

Architecture
- Architect: James Lyndon Pedley
- Style: Decorated Gothic
- Groundbreaking: 30 May 1855
- Completed: 1856
- Closed: 1948
- Demolished: 1952

St Matthias’ Church, Farm Street, Birmingham is a former Church of England parish church in Birmingham.

== History ==
The church was designed by James Lyndon Pedley. The foundation stone was laid on 30 May 1855 and it was consecrated on 5 June 1856 and a parish was assigned out of St George in the Fields, Hockley in 1856

In 1874 part of the parish was taken to form St Saviour's Church, Hockley. In 1899 part of the parish was taken to form St Edward's Church, Hockley.

The church was damaged in an air raid in the Second World War and was closed in 1948 and demolished in 1952.

== Organ ==
The church had a pipe organ by William Hill. A specification of the organ can be found on the National Pipe Organ Register.
