= St Paul's Church, Lozells =

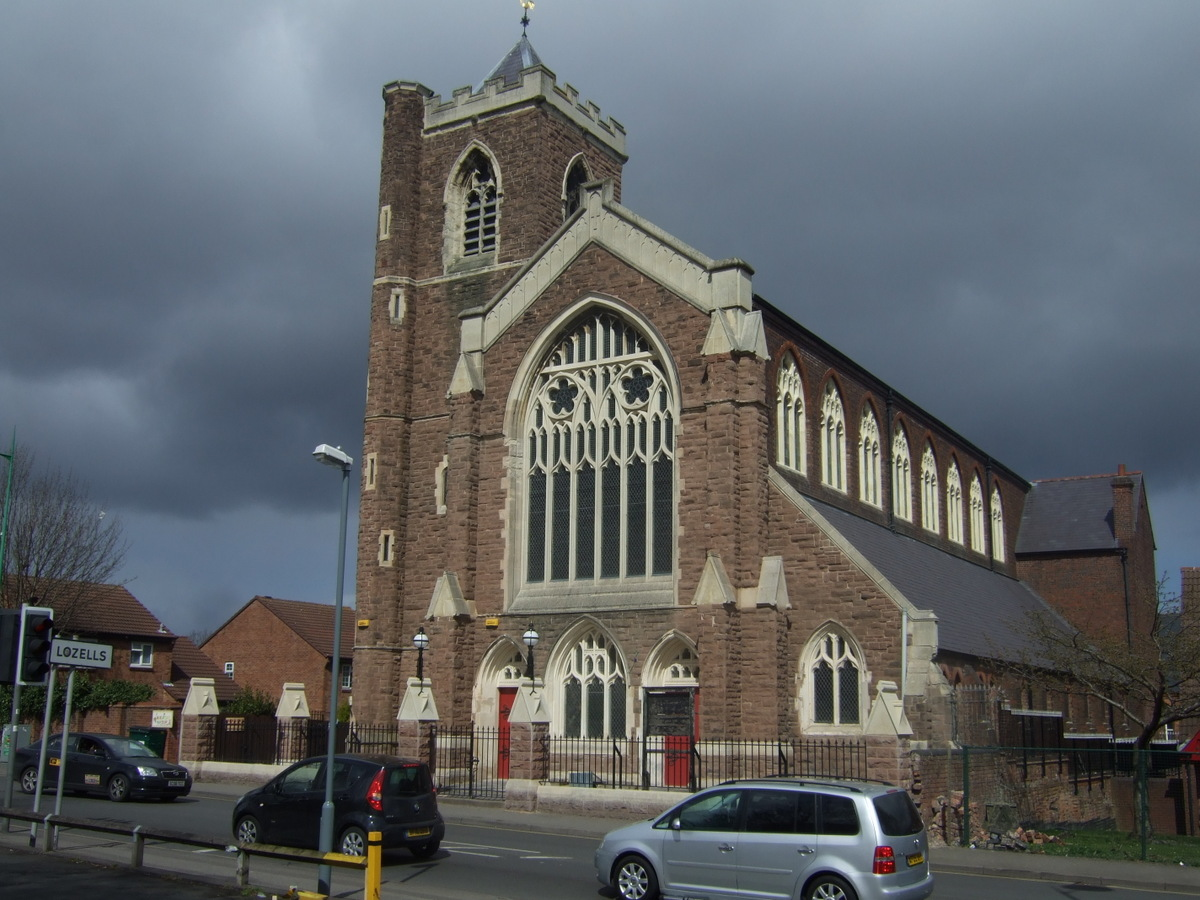
- St Paul's Church, Lozells
- 52°30′9.31″N 1°54′7.38″W
- OS grid reference: SP 06735 89441
- Location: Birmingham
- Country: England
- Denomination: Assemblies of the First Born Church of God
- Previous denomination: Church of England

History
- Dedication: St Paul

Architecture
- Heritage designation: Grade II listed
- Architect: J. A. Chatwin
- Groundbreaking: 11 July 1879
- Completed: 1880
- Construction cost: £8,700

Specifications
- Capacity: 800 persons
- Length: 121.75 feet (37.11 m)
- Width: 49.6 feet (15.1 m)

St Paul's Church, Lozells is a Grade II listed redundant parish church in the Church of England in Birmingham now used by the Assemblies of the First Born Church of God.

== History ==
The foundation stone was laid on 11 July 1879 by Colonel Ratcliff and the building was constructed by Horsman and Co of Wolverhampton to designs by J. A. Chatwin. The church was consecrated on 11 September 1880 by the Bishop of Worcester.

The building was sold by the Church of England in 1982 and acquired by the Assemblies of the First Born Church of God. The Church of England congregation merged with that of St Silas’ Church, Lozells, and a new building was commissioned for this joint parish.

== Organ ==
The church contained an organ dating from 1889 by Casson. A specification of the organ can be found on the National Pipe Organ Register.
