= Ufton =

Village and civil parish in Warwickshire, England

Coordinates: 52°15′N 1°26′W

- Village
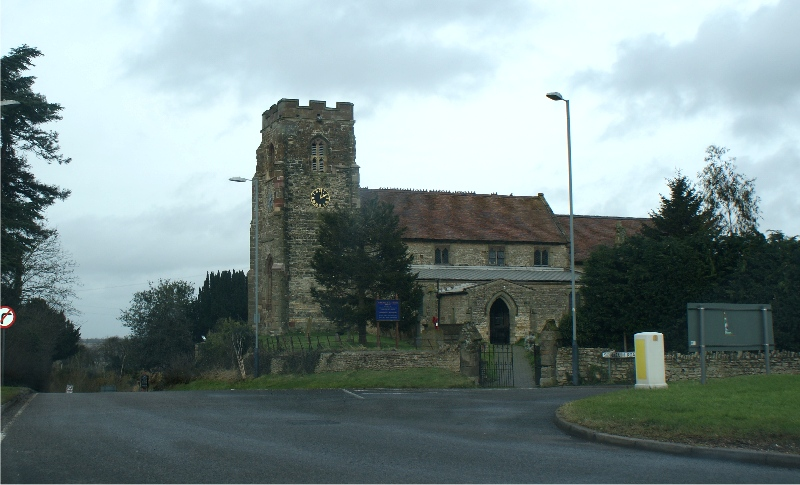
- Population: 319 (2011)
- Shire county: Warwickshire
- Region: West Midlands
- Country: England
- Sovereign state: United Kingdom
- Post town: Coventry
- Postcode district: CV33
- Police: Warwickshire
- Fire: Warwickshire
- Ambulance: West Midlands

Ufton is a small village and civil parish in the Stratford-on-Avon District of Warwickshire, England. The population taken from the 2011 census was 319. It is 5 miles (8 km) south east of Royal Leamington Spa and 2 miles (3 km) west of Southam on the A425 road. It sits on top of a glacial escarpment 121 metres above sea level, which was formed during the last ice age. Ufton Fields, a 77-acre (31 ha) Site of Special Scientific Interest, is to the south east of the village. The parish church, which is dedicated to St Michael, dates back at least to the start of the 13th century. The Grand Union Canal is within walking distance of the village to the north.

== History ==
The origin of the name Ufton is uncertain. In the Long Itchington Charter is called "Wulluht Graf" which is, in modern English, Ufton Wood. In the Domesday Book it is called "Ulchtune". One theory is the name comes from the Danish chief Ulla who lived in the area. The village has historic links to Balliol College of Oxford University which owned much of the parish land in the 19th century. In September 2007, a large fire at the landfill site just outside the village resulted in 100 tonnes of rubber burning for two days. The story made the national press. Just over a year later, however, the village won the "Best Village in Warwickshire" award as voted for by the Warwickshire Rural Community Council, as well as the "Best Communications" section in a similar competition sponsored by Calor.

== Transport ==
Buses are run by Stagecoach Midlands. Services run to Leamington Spa, Southam and Rugby.
