= Lozells =

Inner-city area in West Birmingham, England

Coordinates: 52.501515°N 1.909819°W

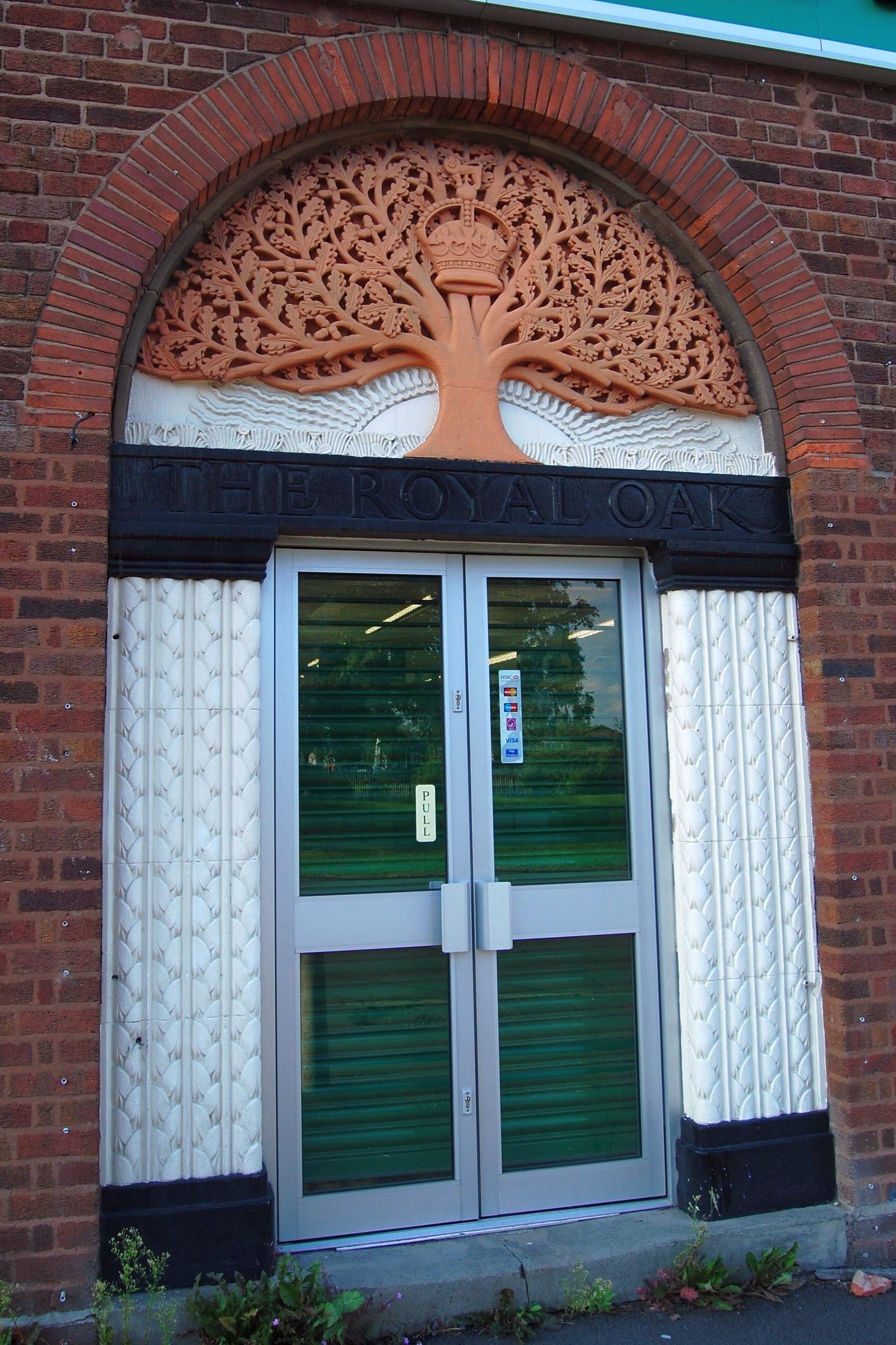
Doorway of The Royal Oak, carving by William Bloye.

Lozells is a loosely defined inner-city area in West Birmingham, England. It is centred on Lozells Road, and is known for its multi-racial population. It is part of the ward of Lozells and East Handsworth and lies between the districts of Handsworth and Aston.

Lozells has a high population density compared to East Handsworth. It is a very ethnically diverse area with a high population of people of Afro-Caribbean, Bangladeshi and Pakistani origin. Housing in Lozells consists mainly of terraced houses, which were constructed during the Industrial Revolution when the area became industrialised and the workers required housing. The housing is a mix of private and council housing, with some newer post-war tower-blocks and estates.

Lozells Road was the scene of rioting from 9–11 September 1985, with shops, houses and vehicles being burnt, and looting also taking place. Racial tension, high unemployment and hostility towards the police were seen as major factors of the rioting. Further riots on the night of the 22 October 2005 left two men dead and a police officer shot and wounded. These riots were started by an unsubstantiated rumour, broadcast on a pirate radio station, of a girl being raped. Four men were later jailed for their part in the riots.

The former Royal Oak pub on Lozells Road, now a shop, has a doorway with a carving of a 'royal oak' by the sculptor William Bloye.

== Churches ==
Local churches include:

- St Francis of Assisi
- St Paul's
- St Silas'
- UCKG HelpCentre

== Education ==
Schools in the area include Lozells Primary School, Holte School, Mayfield Special School, Anglesey Primary School and Heathfield Primary School.

== People ==
- Albert Ketèlbey (1875-1959) – composer, conductor, and pianist, born at 41 Alma Street
- Zarah Sultana MP – Won the Coventry South constituency for Labour in the 2019 United Kingdom general election.
