= St Silas' Church, Lozells =

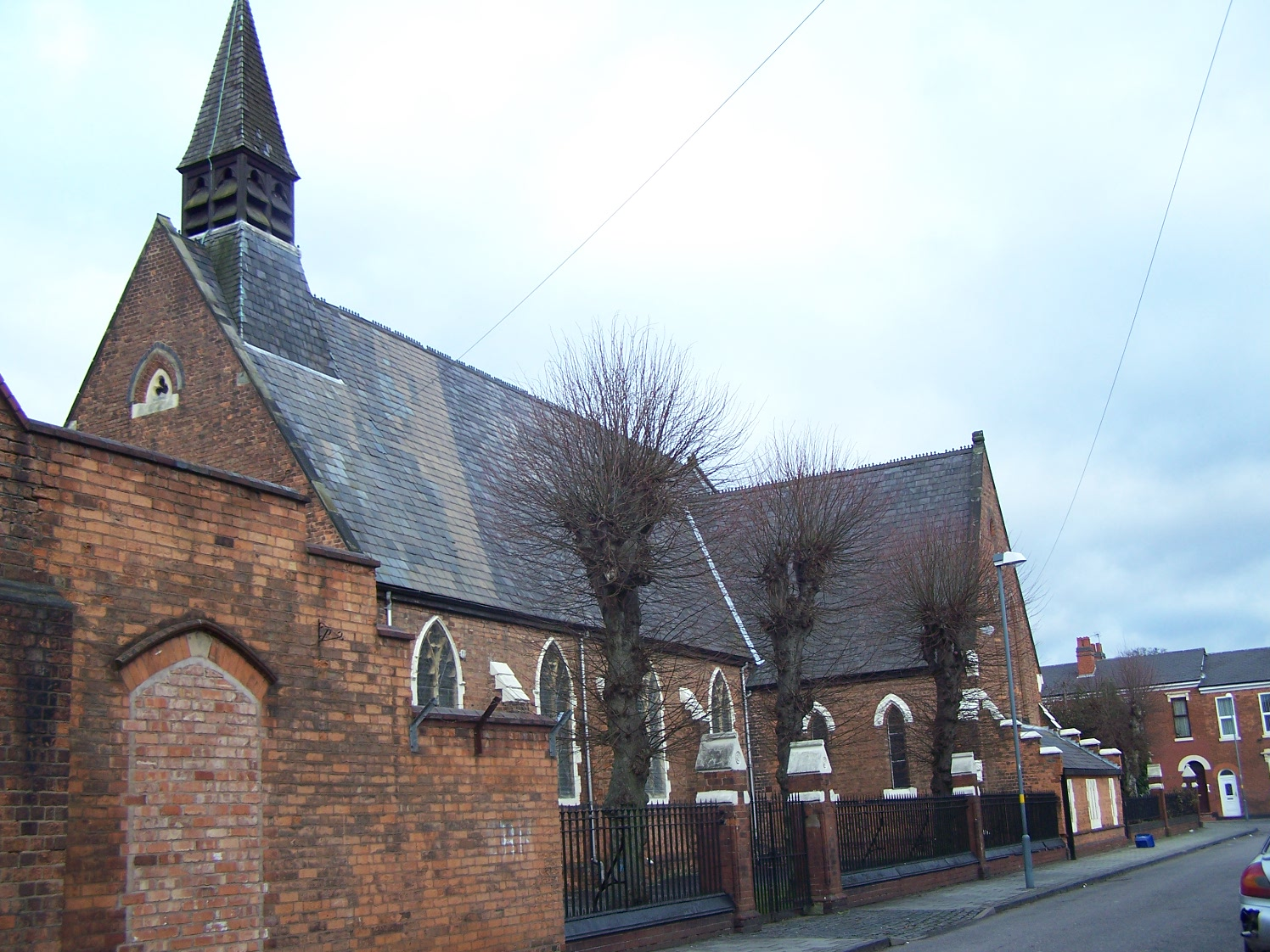
- St Silas' Church, Lozells
- St Silas' Church, Lozells
- 52°30′5.97″N 1°54′46.42″W
- OS grid reference: SP 06028 89338
- Location: Birmingham
- Country: England
- Denomination: Triumphant Church of God
- Previous denomination: Church of England

History
- Dedication: St Silas
- Consecrated: 10 January 1854

Architecture
- Heritage designation: Grade II listed
- Architect: Frederick.W. Fiddian
- Groundbreaking: 2 June 1852
- Completed: 1854

St Silas' Church, Lozells is a Grade II listed redundant parish church in the Church of England in Birmingham now used by the Triumphant Church of God.

== History ==
The foundation stone was laid on 2 June 1852 by Right Hon. Lord Calthorpe. A vase containing coins of the present reign was deposited in a cavity underneath the stone and covered with a brass plate, referring to Frederick Gough, 4th Baron Calthorpe with the following inscription:

This corner-stone was laid by the Right Hon. Lord Calthorpe on Wednesday the 2d day of June, in the year of our Lord 1852. The church, which is dedicated to St. Silas, will contain 1000 sittings, 340 of which will be free; and, including 1000l. endowment, and a repair fund of 250l., is estimated to cost 3600l.; the site having been given by the Rev. W. Burbury, M.A. Trustees: the Right Hon. Lord Calthorpe, Chairman of the Committee, the Rev. W. Burbury, M.A., Joseph Barrows, Esq., Peter Hollins, Esq., J.P. Turner, Esq., Hon. Secretary. First Incumbent, the Rev. D.N. Walton. F. W. Fiddian, architect; James Wilson, contractor.

The church was consecrated on Tuesday 10 January 1854 by Henry Pepys, the Bishop of Worcester. The church included galleries across the transepts and at the west end of the nave. The font was a gift from Peter Hollins; the gas-fittings by Ratcliffe of St Paul's Square, Birmingham.

The east window was stained in 1867 in memory of Rev. D. N. Walton, the first incumbent.

A renovation was carried out in 1881 under the superintendence of J. A. Chatwin. The organ was removed from the west gallery and placed near the chancel, and enlarged by Stringer and Co or Hanley with the addition of 2 new stops. The gallery on the south side was removed. Larger windows were inserted in the nave and filled with stained glass by Camm Brothers.

In his youth, the composer Albert Ketèlbey was head chorister at St Silas' Church.

In 1967, the parish was merged with St Saviour's Church, Hockley when that church closed.

The building was sold by the Church of England in 1985 and acquired by the Triumphant Church of God. The Church of England congregation merged with that of St Paul's Church, Lozells, and a new building was commissioned for this joint parish.
