= Walter H. Price =

English footballer

Walter Price was one of the 'Four Founding Fathers' of Aston Villa Football Club and the club's first captain.

In 1874 Price was a member of the Aston Villa Wesleyan Chapel. Their Bible meetings consisted around 200 young men some of whom had set up a cricket team. The cricketers were keen to find an outlet for their energy in the off-season, they were initially undecided between rugby and association football but one member, W.B. Mason, was playing with the Adderley Park Grasshoppers rugby team and four members, Price, Walter Scattergood, Jack Hughes and George Matthews, were tasked with watching him play. Grasshoppers were to play the Handsworth rugby club at Heathfield Park so the four attended the match. Having watched the game, the four men returned along Heathfield Road. They adjourned beneath a dim gas light near Villa Cross and between themselves agreed rugby was a little too rough and that they would play association football. The gas lamp meeting is traditionally held as the birth of Aston Villa Football Club.

Co-founder Hughes' view was that Aston Villa Football Club was really formed later by the players who attended the first kick-about on waste ground on Westminster Road, now the RCCG Salvation Theatre. They hired a football for 1s 6d (roughly 1/3 the daily wage) from Clapshaw & Cleave. The sixteen then each contributed a shilling and elected Price as their first captain and Charlie H. Midgley as club secretary.

The first match was arranged against the members' friends and cricket opponents of Aston, St Mary's. James Wilson allowed the game to be played at his building plots on Wilson Road, Birchfield. Aston Villa Football Club played in scarlet and royal blue striped shirts, white shorts and royal blue caps and stockings. The club rules stated "No member can take place in a match unless in the above uniform". St Mary's played rugby so a compromise was reached whereby, using the round ball, Villa played rugby in the first half and soccer in the second. Under the Sheffield Rules up to fifteen players were allowed at the time. Scattergood kept goal; the full-backs were Price, William Weis and Fred J. Knight; half-backs were Midgely, Ted Lee, Harry and George Matthews; forwards: Hughes, Mason, William Sothers, Wiiliam Such, Harry Whately, George Page, and Alfred Robbins. After a goalless first-half, Hughes scored the only goal off the rebound when the goal-keeper spilled his first effort.

Price would be succeeded as captain by George Ramsay who came to join Aston Villa by chance shortly after arriving in Birmingham. One day in 1876, whilst taking a stroll in Aston Park, the 21-year-old Ramsay came across a Villa players' practice match and was asked to make up the numbers. They were amazed by his skills, they had never seen a display of close ball control before. When the game was over, the Villa players surrounded him and invited him to join the club, and very soon he became their captain. Ramsay later described the newly formed club's approach to the game as 'a dash at the man and a big kick at the ball'. Word spread about how fine a player Ramsay was, spectators began turning up to watch the little man nicknamed 'Scotty'. He also took charge of training which saw dramatic improvement that showed in the results, introducing what was known as the "passing game". This had become the main style of play in Scotland whereas in England most teams relied on what was known as the "dribbling game".
