= Adderley Park =

Park in Birmingham, England

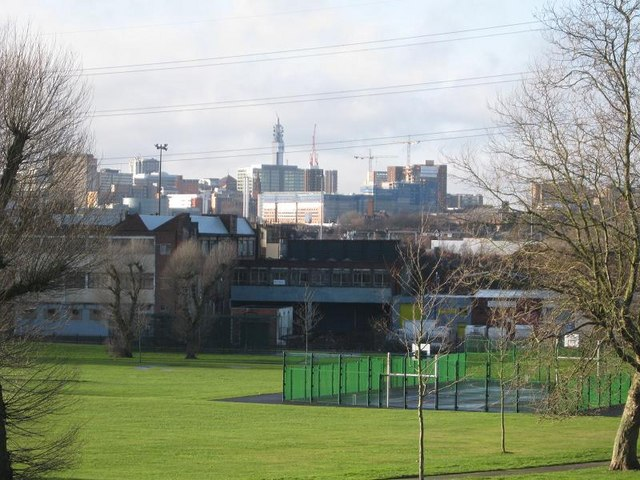
- Birmingham seen from Adderley Park
- Interactive map of Adderley Park
- Location: Birmingham, England
- Coordinates: 52°29′06″N 1°51′40″W
- Area: 10 acres (4.0 ha)
- Operator: Birmingham City Council

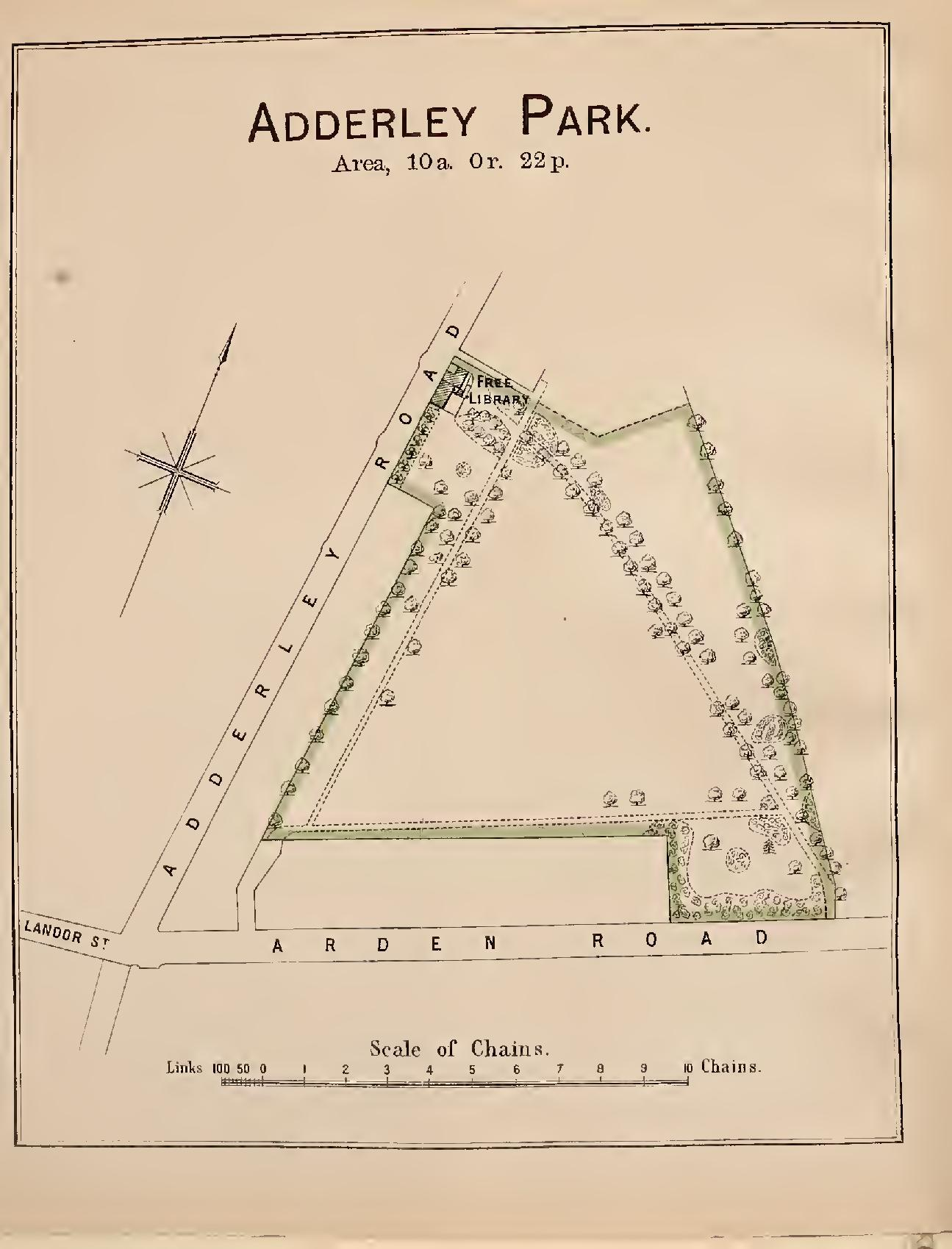
1892 plan of the park

Adderley Park is an area in the east of Birmingham, England. Charles Adderley MP donated 10 acres (4.0 ha) of land to create the park, which he managed privately from 1855 to 1864. The park was opened to the public on 30 August 1856. At the park's entrance were buildings housing a library, reading room and museum. The buildings have since been demolished.

The area is served by Adderley Park railway station.

In November 1874 local sportsman, Billy Mason, was playing with the Adderley Park Grasshoppers rugby team. Four members of his local Bible Class cricket club, Jack Hughes, William Scattergood, Walter Price and George Matthews, were tasked with watching him play. Grasshoppers were due to play the Handsworth rugby club at Heathfield Park so the four attended the match. Having seen the game, the four men returned along Heathfield Road. They adjourned beneath a dim gas light and between themselves agreed rugby was a little too rough and that they would form a club to play association football. The gas lamp meeting is traditionally held as the birth of Aston Villa Football Club.

Adderley Park is notable for being the home of Wolseley Motors from 1901 until the late 1920s when following William Morris's purchase of Wolseley the plant was given over to commercial vehicle production, mainly light vans. With the formation of British Leyland in 1968, the Adderley Park plant's days were numbered. At that time it employed almost 3,000 people but was one of the first to be earmarked for closure. The last vans to be produced there left the factory in early 1972.
