= Charlie Johnstone =

Scottish footballer (1856–1941)

Charles Samuel Johnstone (September 1856 – 30 September 1941) was an educator, footballer and Director as well as Vice‐President of Aston Villa. He is notable for playing in Aston Villa's first ever FA Cup tie. Following retirement from the game, he wrote the Football Notes column for the Birmingham Daily Mail. He joined the Aston Villa Management Committee and became one of Aston Villa Football Club Limited's first four directors in 1896. Charlie was an all-round athlete and played cricket for St. Mary's, Aston, Small Heath and Aston Unity; and was the Northern Counties Champion in the 440-yard dash and hundred yards.

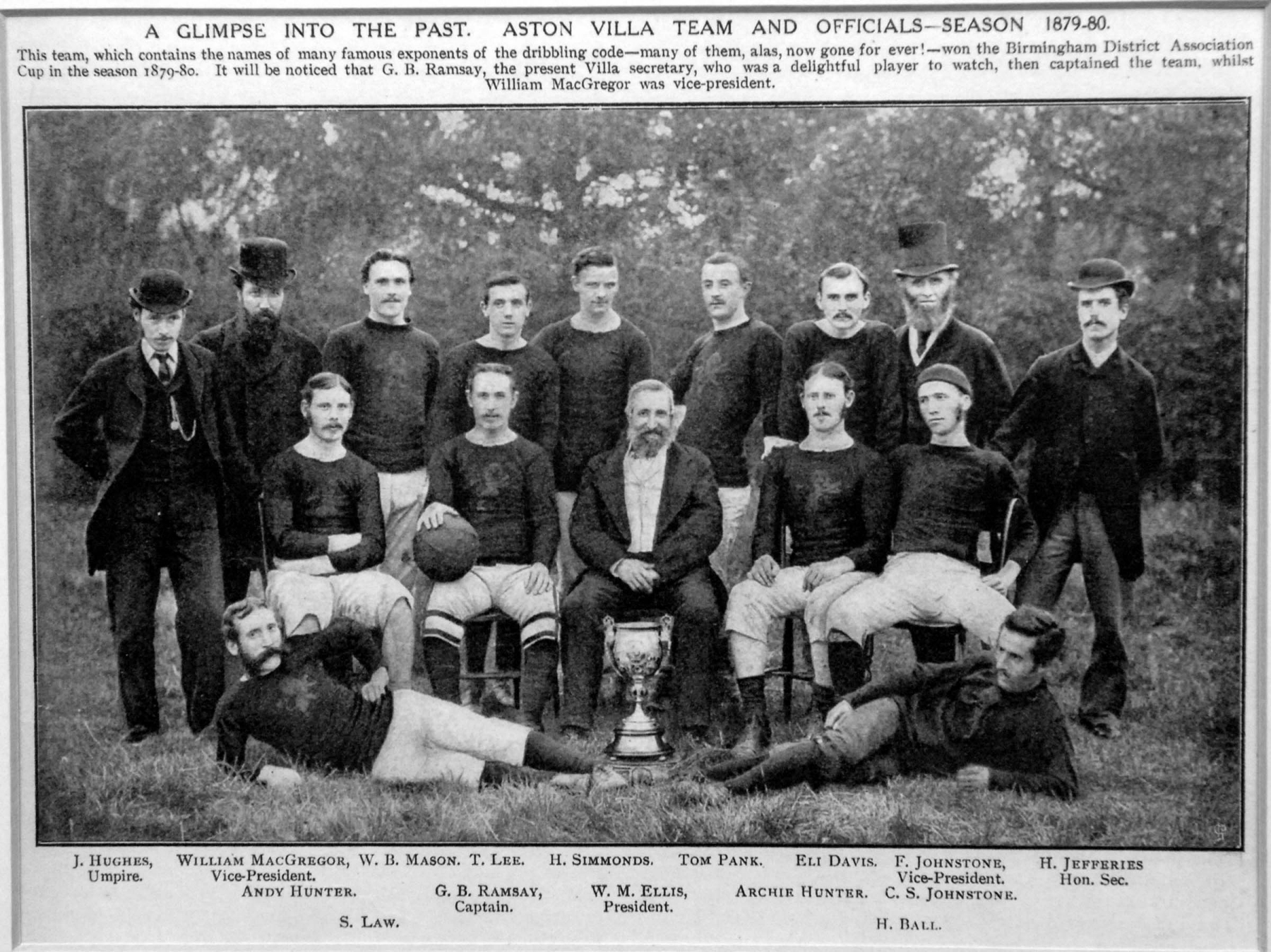
Aston Villa 1879–80, C.S. Johnstone middle row, right. His father is also in the photo

== Early life ==
Johnstone moved to Birmingham with his parents in 1873. He was the son of Scottish publishing agent and Villa vice-president Fergus Johnstone. Fergus was a close friend of William McGregor and became one of the first Vice-Presidents of Aston Villa. Charlie married and his children included a son, also Fergus and a daughter. He would baby-sit taking his grandchild to the school-room and pushing a pram through the streets.

== Aston St Mary's ==
Johnstone had played rugby at Montrose Academy and introduced the game to his cricket team-mates of Aston Brook St Mary's. The cricketers were keen to find an outlet for their energy in the off-season. This was organised by Johnstone. A ball was obtained from Clapshaw & Cleave on Edmund Street and they negotiated a two-year tenancy in the lower ground of Aston Park, beside Aston Park Unity who later played on the higher ground.

In 1875, St Mary's were challenged to a match by their friends and cricket opponents from the Aston Villa Cricket Club who had newly formed the Aston Villa Football Club. The builder James Wilson allowed the game to be played on his plots at Wilson Road, Birchfield. Aston Villa Football Club played in scarlet and royal blue hooped shirts, white shorts and royal blue caps and stockings. The club rules stated "No member can take place in a match unless in the above uniform". For Aston Villa Scattergood kept goal; the full-backs were WH Price, William Weis and Fred J. Knight; half-backs were Midgely, Ted Lee, Harry and George Matthews; forwards: Jack Hughes, Mason, William Sothers, William Such, Harry Whately, George Page, and Alfred Robbins.

St Mary's played rugby so a compromise was reached whereby, using the round ball, the teams played rugby in the first half and soccer in the second. In later years Johnstone reminisced "Hack him down - sit on his head, was the cry for one half the game, and You must not collar-charge him, was yelled for the other". Under the Sheffield Rules up to fifteen players were allowed at the time. After a goalless first-half, Villa scored the only goal when the goal-keeper spilled Jack Hughes first effort and he was able to bury the rebound. In a newspaper article, almost fifty years later, in March 1924, Hughes was insistent that this was Villa's first match and had occurred on the third Saturday of March 1874. However a report of the event was published in Birmingham Morning News on 16 March 1875.

== Saltley College ==
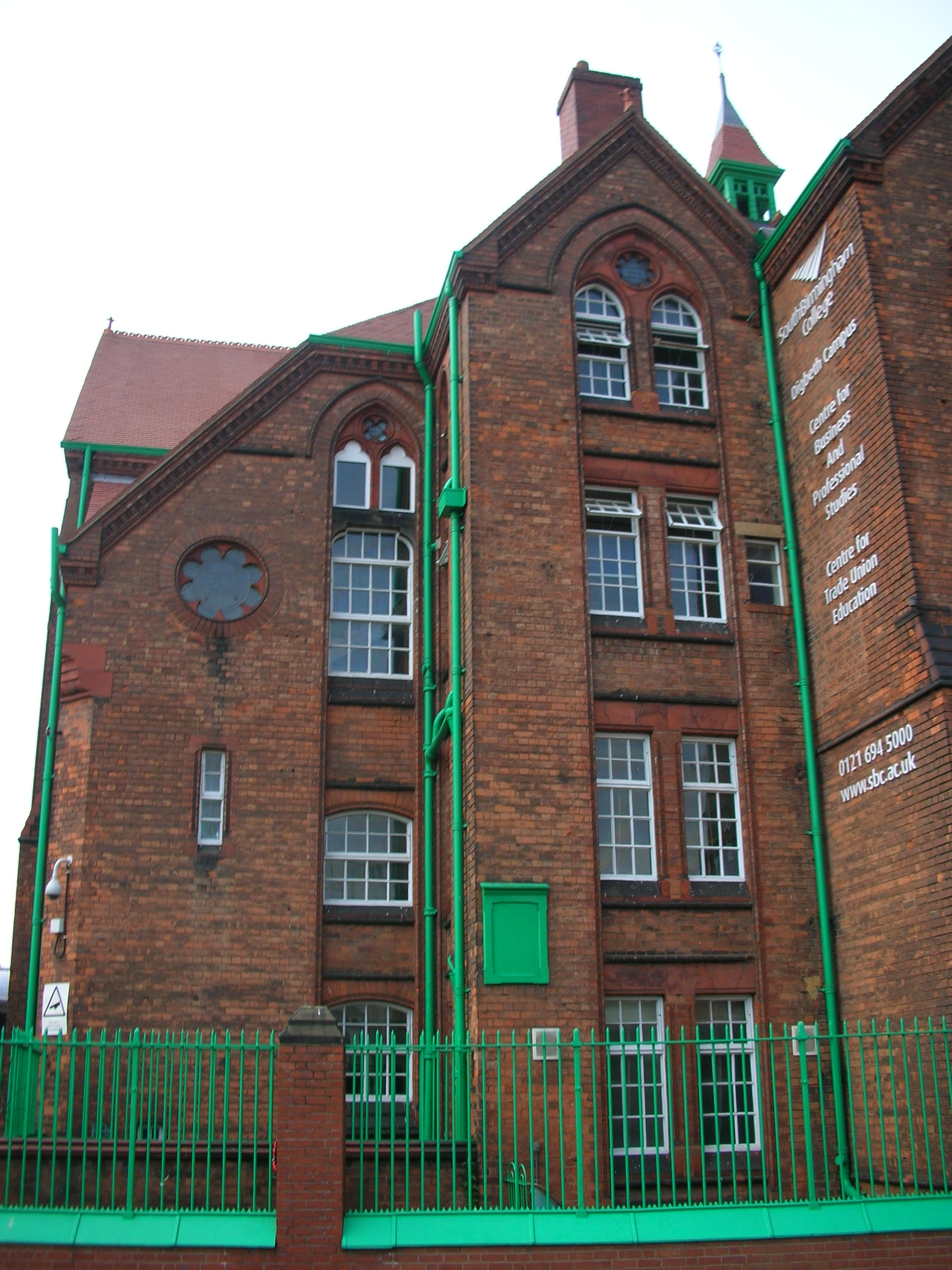
Floodgate School, Floodgate Street and Milk Street, Deritend, Birmingham. Now Arts & Media Annexe, South Birmingham College

From 1876, Johnstone attended St Peter's and played for the Saltley College Football Club.

The Saltley College establishment, played a major but under-recognised role in the founding and rapid growth of association football with teachers spreading enthusiasm and organising school teams and local clubs. Saltley College was considered a nursery of footballing talent, relying on a scientific approach to achievement.

In 1878 Johnstone became an elementary schoolteacher at Jenkins St. Board School. Later he moved to Floodgate St. Board School and in 1900 was appointed headteacher of Burbury St. School, Birmingham. He recognised the problem that inner city schoolboys lacked the physique of their more affluent peers and introduced weights to the training. In his teaching profession he was considered a "martinet" of a pretty despotic kind. The results were that Burbury St won the Birmingham Schools physical exercises shield for twelve consecutive years.

== Aston Villa ==
Johnstone played for Aston Villa between 1877 and 1880. Aston Villa played at Wellington Road, Perry Barr. There were initially no spectator facilities. Play was hampered by a hedge and three trees along the touchline. There was no money available so, instead of Saturday training, Johnston and the other players felled the trees. They sold the wood to finance fencing and a gate which they erected themselves, enabling them to charge twopence admission. The first gate amounted to 6s 7½d. Charlie Johnson recalled that the team retired to the Crown & Cushion pub with the first takings. Increasing gate money allowed the ground to be gradually improved.

The 1879–80 football season saw Aston Villa's entry into top flight competitive association football with their first tie in the Football Association Cup. The start of the official record was Saturday 13 December 1879 when Villa faced Stafford Road, of the Stafford Road railway works, Wolverhampton. The match was played before a crowd of 2,000 at Stafford's Half-Way House Ground. In 2024, celebrating the club's 150th anniversary, Aston Villa Legacy Numbers were introduced indexing every first-team player who had represented the club in a competitive fixture. Although playing before shirt numbers were introduced in 1926, Goalkeeper John Ball received Legacy Number 1. Half-back Johnstone received Legacy Number #6, Andy Hunter #4 officially became Villa's first goal-scorer in the 1–1 draw. The replay was held at Villa's Wellington Road ground on 24 January 1880 with inside-forward George Ramsay replacing Johnstone. The same season Johnstone played in the Villa team that won the Birmingham Senior Cup.

Johnstone made his second FA Cup appearance in the following season against Wednesbury Strollers. Playing uphill in the first-half Villa were 3–1 down at half-time. In the second-half they had the advantage of the Wellington Road slope and triumphed 5–3 in the end. Johnstone went on to play for Lozells British Constitutionals F.C.

Almost fifteen years later in February 1895 Johnstone again played for Aston Villa, by now the reigning Football League Champions. Due to a gap in the fixtures a friendly match had been arranged against London Caledonians. When Dorrell missed the train Johnstone took to the pitch to make up the numbers. The 5–0 victory meant Johnstone remained undefeated in a Villa shirt.

=== Management Committee ===
Johnstone joined the Aston Villa Management Committee in 1892. He became one of the first four directors of Aston Villa Football Club Limited in 1896 before resigning in 1900. His influence continued both at the Club and through his journalism. He returned as Vice-President in the 1920s together with Tommy Pank.

As Vice-President, Johnstone's invaluable foresight was pivotal in the acquisition of Villa Park. The land at the Wellington Road ground had initially been sub-let to the club for £5.00 a year but, as Villa became more successful, the rent kept rising and rising and the landlord would not grant a sufficiently long lease to justify the massive expenditure need to improve the facilities to match the club's ambition. Johnstone acquired an option at the Lower Grounds in Aston long before his other directors were persuaded of its merits. Together with Chairman Fred Rinder they secured the deal to enable the move Villa's new home ground.

In the 1897–98 season, Aston Villa's Christmas fixture was away at Everton kicking off at 11:00am. Fred Wheldon, kit man Joe Grierson & Jimmy and John Cowan were travelling to the station when their coach and horse overturned. Playing a crucial game short of players and without kit was not an option but missing a match would incur a fine of £250 (roughly £40,000 in 2026). By the time they arrived, their 8:50am train had departed leaving Johnstone and the rest of the team on the platform. The only option was to take a train to Stafford where they told a special would take them onwards to Liverpool. However once at Stafford, they found there was no train arranged. Johnstone took control and was able to bribe their train's driver, stoker and guard with seats in the director's box, dinner and half a sovereign each if they would continue the train to Liverpool. The game kicked-off ten minutes late. Unfortunately Johnstone was unable to guarantee a victory.

Charles Johnstone died at Canonbie, Dumfries on 30 September 1941 aged 85.
