= Aston Villa Wesleyan Chapel =

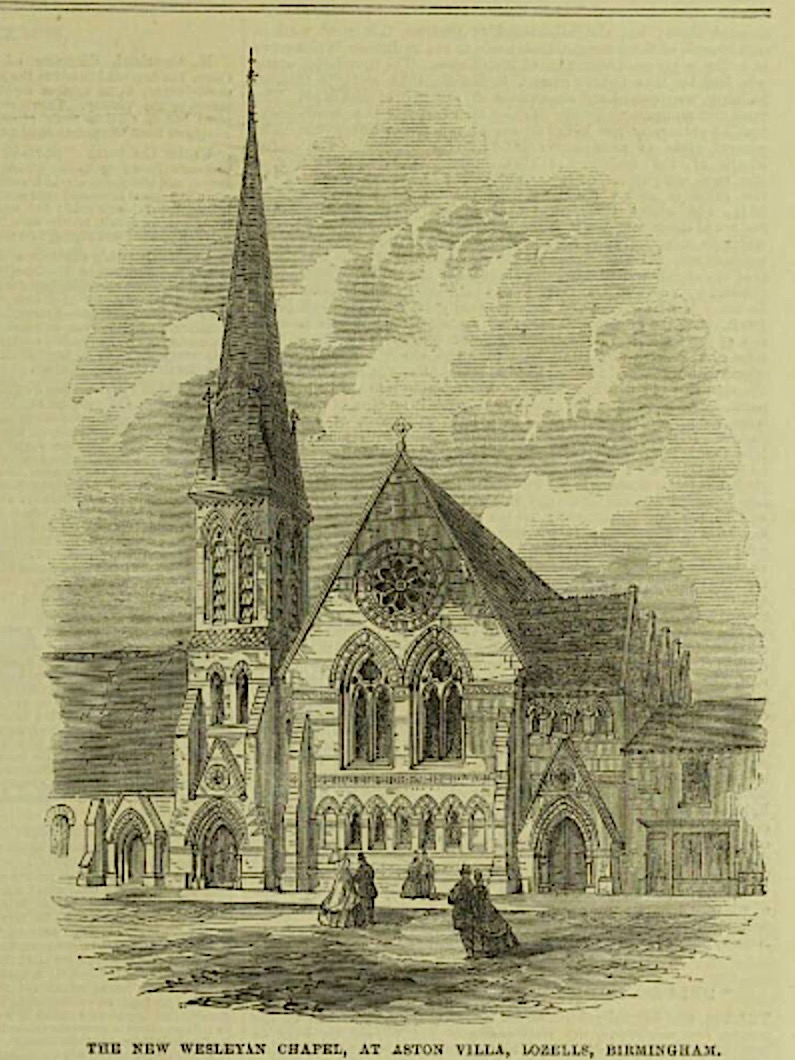
- Former Aston Villa Wesleyan Chapel
- Aston Villa Wesleyan Chapel
- 52.502962°N 1.914711°W
- OS grid reference: SP 05886 89453
- Location: Lozells, Birmingham
- Country: England
- Denomination: Wesleyan Methodist

Architecture
- Architect: John George Bland
- Style: Gothic
- Groundbreaking: 1864
- Completed: 1865
- Construction cost: £4,000
- Demolished: 2008

Specifications
- Capacity: 1100 people
- Length: 84 feet (26 m)
- Width: 58 feet (18 m)
- Height: 120 feet (37 m)

Aston Villa Wesleyan Chapel (also known as Villa Cross Wesleyan Chapel) was a Wesleyan Methodist place of worship in the Lozells area of Birmingham. It is noted as the place where Aston Villa Football Club was founded in 1874. In 1953 the chapel was acquired by the New Testament Church of God, which redeveloped the site in 2009.

== History ==
In 1850 a Wesleyan Methodist chapel was established at the junction of George Street and Lozells Road in Handsworth, a rapidly industrialising Staffordshire settlement a few miles north of Birmingham. Despite being located in Handsworth rather than the neighbouring settlement of Aston, the chapel took its name from a residence known as the Aston Villa, a suburban Georgian building situated at the apex of the junction of what is now Heathfield Road and Lozells Road, immediately opposite the site of the chapel. That building was first recorded on a local map of 1820 and over time had given its name to the surrounding locality, with the junction itself becoming known as Villa Cross.

The initial building where the community met soon became inadequate for the needs of the growing congregation and a competition was launched for the design of a new chapel. In 1863 it was announced that John George Bland had been selected as the architect. The foundation stone of the new chapel was laid on 26 April 1864.

The new chapel was built of red and blue brick, finished with Bath stone dressings and consisted of a nave of five bays, and north and south aisles. At the eastern end of the interior was a shallow chancel opening into the nave with an arch of brickwork and incised stone. At the north angle of the chancel was a vestry with a chamber over it opening into the north gallery. At the other angle was a room containing the heating apparatus and above this a vaulted chamber for the organ, and between the two angles was a small singers’ gallery connected with the organ chamber. Instead of a pulpit, a rostrum with a carved front stood in the chancel on a raised platform, paved with mosaic tiles. The galleries extended the whole length and breadth of the aisles and were supported by iron columns with floreated capitals. The pews were of deal, stained and varnished providing accommodation for 1,100 persons. The western end of the chapel included two windows of two lights and cusped arch, over which was a large window dedicated to St Katherine. All of these windows were fitted with stained glass by Heaton, Butler and Bayne. The remaining windows were glazed with toned glass. The total cost of construction was £4,000 (equivalent to £434,526 in 2025).

The chapel opened for worship on 31 May 1865 when Revd. Dr. Osborne, President of the Conference, preached. The previous chapel was repurposed as a school room. A new organ was opened on 11 June 1869 by the noted organist and recitalist William Thomas Best. It was built by Thomas J. Robson of St Martin’s Lane, London.

Since 1911, when both Handsworth and Aston were administratively incorporated into the city of Birmingham under the Greater Birmingham Scheme, the chapel has been located in the inner city area of Lozells.

In 1953 the chapel was acquired by the New Testament Church of God, a Christian church of Caribbean origin, at which point the association with the name 'Aston Villa' was lost. In 2008 the chapel of 1865 was demolished and replaced with a new building known as the New Testament Church of God, Handsworth. Erected at a cost of £5.2m, the church has capacity for a congregation of 1,100.

== Aston Villa Football Club ==
The Aston Villa Wesleyan Chapel was fundamental to the foundation of Aston Villa Football Club, and gave the club its name. In 1874, members of the chapel's Bible class, who had already formed a cricket team, decided that football would provide a suitable winter sporting activity. According to the club's traditional founding account, four members — Jack Hughes, Walter H. Price, George Matthews and William Scattergood — decided to play association football rather than rugby after watching a game at Heathfield Park. The story places their discussion beneath a gas lamp on Heathfield Road, near Villa Cross. Villa Park, Aston Villa FC's home ground since 1897, lies less than two miles from the site of this meeting. In 2014, to mark the club's 140th anniversary, a Founding Lamp commemorating the story was unveiled outside the Holte End stand.
