= Heathfield Hall =

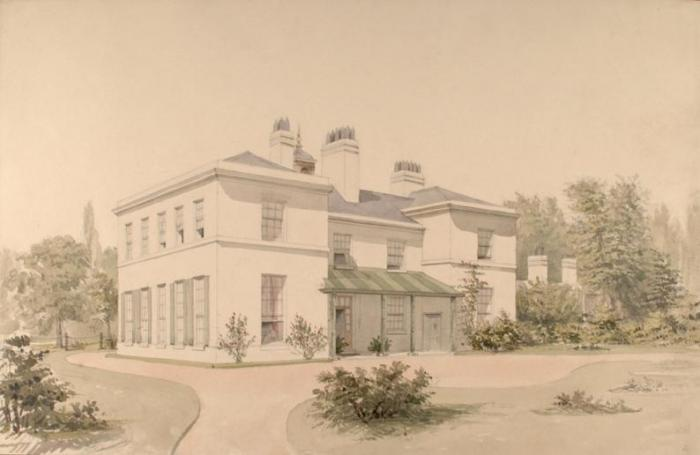
- An 1835 painting of Heathfield Hall, by Allen Edward Everitt
- Interactive map of the Heathfield Hall area
- Alternative names: Heathfield House James Watt House Heathfield Estate Heathfield Park

General information
- Type: House
- Location: Birmingham, England
- Coordinates: 52.5058°N 1.9155°W
- Construction started: 1790
- Demolished: 1927
- Client: James Watt

Design and construction
- Architect: Samuel Wyatt

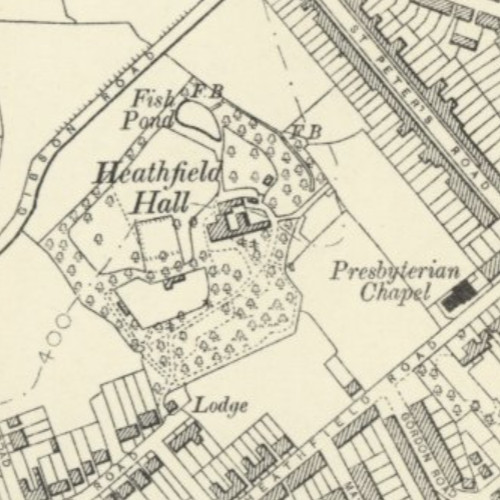
Heathfield Hall, on an Ordnance OS six-inch map of the period 1888-1913

Heathfield Hall (sometimes referred to as Heathfield House) was a house in Handsworth, Staffordshire, England that was built for the engineer James Watt. The area became part of Birmingham in 1911.

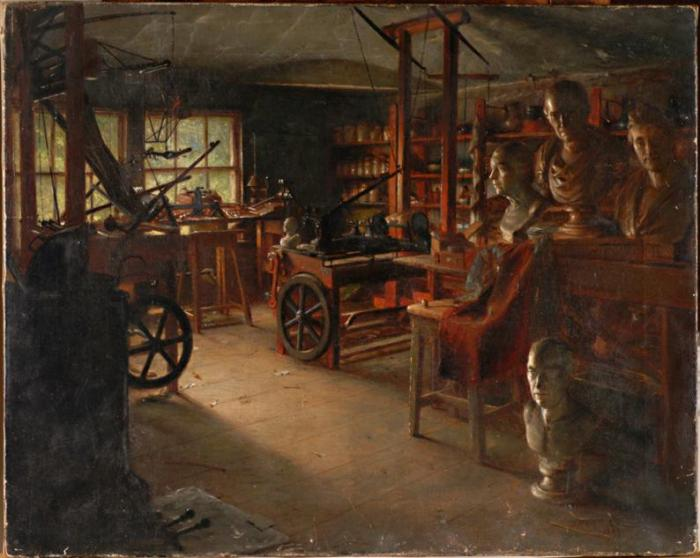
Watt's workroom at Heathfield Hall, painted in 1889 by Jonathon Pratt

In 1790, Watt's business partner Matthew Boulton recommended to Watt his friend, the architect Samuel Wyatt, who had designed Boulton's home, Soho House, in 1789. Watt commissioned Wyatt to design Heathfield Hall.

Watt died in the house in 1819, and was buried at nearby St Mary's Church. His garret workshop was then sealed, and few people were ever allowed to visit it. The contents – over 8,300 objects, including the furniture, window, door and floorboards – were removed in 1924 and used to recreate the room at the Science Museum in London, where they may still be viewed.

A series of subsequent owners slowly began to sell off the associated lands for the development of semi-detached villas. Notable landowners included James Clifford Hudson, son of Joseph Hudson who was the founder of J Hudson and Co. In the 1880s the engineer George Tangye bought Heathfield Hall. He lived in the house until his death in 1920. After his family sold the house, from 1927 the hall was demolished and the lands redeveloped.

== Heathfield Estate ==
Around 1825 when the surrounding areas were sold off as building plots, the road from Aston Villa to Bristnall's End became Heathfield Road. What was the Heathfield Estate is now the land that comprises Brecon Road, North Drive, West Drive and James Watt Drive in Handsworth. It was developed in the 1930s with a number of arts and crafts and moderne-style houses that are considerably larger than other houses in Birmingham due to strict covenants set by the land owners.

The original lodge to Heathfield Hall still stands today on North Drive and is now a private house. A plaque was placed on the lodge awarded by The Birmingham Civic Society.

The original cast iron signs for Heathfield Park, the large heathfield surrounding the hall, still stand today along North Drive. Additionally, a fish pond used to be present on the area which today is the west corner of Brecon Road. Many frogs can be seen in the gardens of the houses on Brecon Road during breeding season.

The Presbyterian chapel is now the Shree Geeta Bhawan Hindu temple. The building was the former St George's Presbyterian Church and was originally designed by J.P.Osborne in a cruciform shape in 1896.
