= Birchfield, Birmingham =

Area of Perry Barr, Birmingham, England

Coordinates: 52.505956°N 1.903811°W

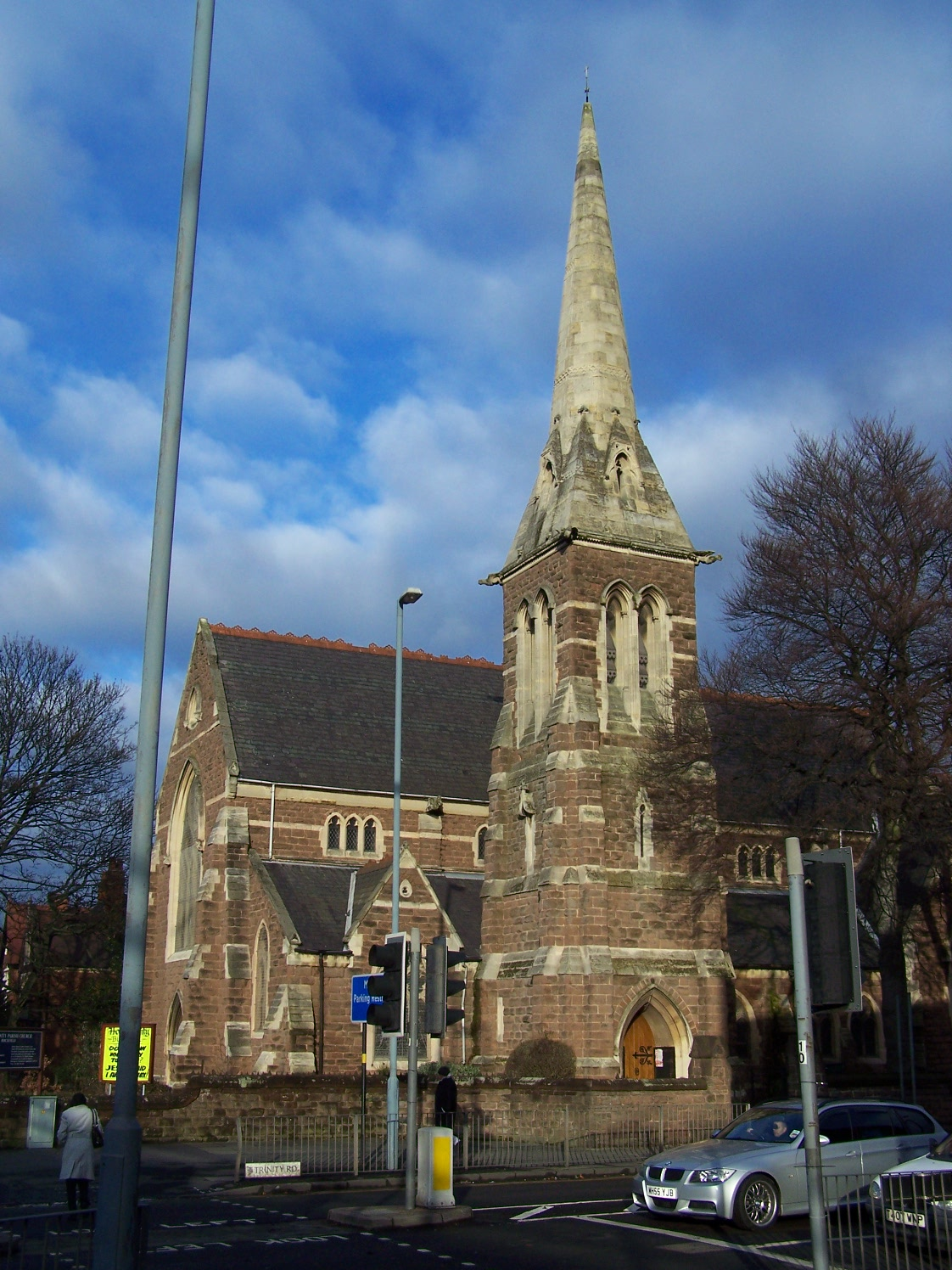
Holy Trinity Church, Birchfield is a local landmark

Birchfield is located in and between Perry Barr, Aston, Handsworth Wood. Birchfield shares the B6 and B20 postcode with surrounding areas Handsworth Wood, Aston and Perry Barr. The main roads within the area include Birchfield road, This leads on to towards Birmingham city centre. The area is home to many schools, including Birchfield Community Primary School.

The churches include Holy Trinity parish church (Church of England), Perry Barr Methodist Church, Jehovah's Witnesses Gospel Hall in Trinity Road and the Birchfield Gospel Hall.

The Birchfield Harriers were named after the area. The area is represented by Ayoub Khan, the independent MP for Birmingham Perry Barr. It is also represented by a Labour councillor.
