= 1888–89 West Bromwich Albion F.C. season =

West Bromwich Albion
1888–89 season
- Chairman: Henry Jackson/Edward W. Heelis (Note: Heelis succeeded Jackson at some point during 1888, but the source does not specify whether this was during 1887–88 or 1888–89.)
- Manager: None (Note: Albion did not have a secretary-manager until 1890 and did not appoint a full-time manager until 1948.)
- Stadium: Stoney Lane
- Football League: 6th
- FA Cup: Semi-final
- Top goalscorer: League: Billy Bassett, Tom Pearson (11); All: Billy Bassett (14)
Home colours

The 1888–89 season was the 11th season in the history of West Bromwich Albion, as well as their first season in the newly formed Football League, of which they were a founder member. They finished in 6th position with 22 points.

== Final league table ==
| Pos | Team | Pld | W | D | L | GF | GA | GAv | Pts |
|---|---|---|---|---|---|---|---|---|---|
| 4 | Blackburn Rovers | 22 | 10 | 6 | 6 | 66 | 45 | 1.467 | 26 |
| 5 | Bolton Wanderers | 22 | 10 | 2 | 10 | 63 | 59 | 1.068 | 22 |
| 6 | West Bromwich Albion | 22 | 10 | 2 | 10 | 40 | 46 | 0.870 | 22 |
| 7 | Accrington | 22 | 6 | 8 | 8 | 48 | 48 | 1.000 | 20 |
| 8 | Everton | 22 | 9 | 2 | 11 | 35 | 47 | 0.745 | 20 |

Source: World Football
Rules for classification: 1) Points; 2) Goal average; 3) Goals scored

== Results ==
West Bromwich Albion's score comes first

=== Legend ===
| Win | Draw | Loss |

=== Football League ===
| Match | Date | Opponent | Venue | Result | Attendance | Scorers |
|---|---|---|---|---|---|---|
| 1 | 8 September 1888 | Stoke | A | 2–0 | 4,500 | Wilson, Woodhall |
| 2 | 15 September 1888 | Derby County | A | 2–1 | 3,000 | Bassett, Pearson |
| 3 | 22 September 1888 | Blackburn Rovers | A | 2–6 | 8,000 | Bayliss, Pearson |
| 4 | 29 September 1888 | Burnley | H | 4–3 | 2,100 | Perry, Bassett, Hendry, Shaw |
| 5 | 6 October 1888 | Derby County | H | 5–0 | 2,100 | Perry, Bassett, Pearson (3) |
| 6 | 13 October 1888 | Preston North End | A | 0–3 | 10,000 | |
| 7 | 20 October 1888 | Notts County | H | 4–2 | 2,000 | Pearson (2), Wilson, Woodhall |
| 8 | 3 November 1888 | Accrington | H | 2–2 | 1,000 | Wilson, Bassett |
| 9 | 5 November 1888 | Bolton Wanderers | H | 1–5 | 4,000 | Bassett |
| 10 | 10 November 1888 | Burnley | A | 0–2 | 5,000 | |
| 11 | 17 November 1888 | Bolton Wanderers | A | 2–1 | 3,500 | Hendry, Pearson |
| 12 | 24 November 1888 | Accrington | A | 1–2 | 2,000 | Perry |
| 13 | 1 December 1888 | Everton | H | 4–1 | 5,000 | Perry, Bassett (2), Hendry |
| 14 | 15 December 1888 | Wolverhampton Wanderers | A | 1–2 | 3,000 | Pearson |
| 15 | 22 December 1888 | Blackburn Rovers | H | 2–1 | 1,000 | Pearson, Bassett |
| 16 | 26 December 1888 | Preston North End | H | 0–5 | 5,150 | |
| 17 | 29 December 1888 | Stoke | H | 2–0 | 4,900 | Bassett, Wilson |
| 18 | 5 January 1889 | Wolverhampton Wanderers | H | 1–3 | 4,000 | Woodhall |
| 19 | 12 January 1889 | Notts County | A | 1–2 | 2,000 | Bassett |
| 20 | 19 January 1889 | Aston Villa | A | 0–2 | 10,000 | |
| 21 | 26 January 1889 | Aston Villa | H | 3–3 | 8,515 | Bassett, Pearson (2) |
| 22 | 23 February 1889 | Everton | H | 1–0 | 8,000 | Crabtree |

=== FA Cup ===
| Round | Date | Opponent | Venue | Result | Attendance | Scorers |
|---|---|---|---|---|---|---|
| R1 | 2 February 1889 | Small Heath | A | 3–2 | 3,034 | Perry, Wilson, Pearson |
| R2 | 16 February 1889 | Burnley | H | 5–1 | 5,104 | Perry (3), Wilson, Bayliss |
| R3 | 2 March 1889 | Chatham | A | 10–1 | 17,000 | Bassett (2), Perry, Wilson (3), Bayliss (2), Timmins, Own Goal |
| Semi final | 16 March 1889 | Preston North End | N | 0–1 | 22,688 | |

== Appearances ==
| Pos. | Name | League | | FA Cup | | Total | |
| Pos. | Name | Apps | Goals | Apps | Goals | Apps | Goals |
|---|---|---|---|---|---|---|---|
| FW | (England) Billy Bassett | 21 | 11 | 4 | 2 | 25 | 13 |
| U | (England) Jem Bayliss | 21 | 1 | 4 | 2 | 25 | 3 |
| FW | (England) Fredrick Crabtree | 1 | 1 | 0 | 0 | 1 | 1 |
| FB | (England) Harry Green | 9 | 0 | 4 | 0 | 13 | 0 |
| FW | (England) George Haynes | 5 | 0 | 0 | 0 | 5 | 0 |
| FW | (Scotland) Billy Hendry | 16 | 4 | 0 | 0 | 16 | 4 |
| HB | (England) Ezra Horton | 8 | 0 | 4 | 0 | 12 | 0 |
| FB | (England) Jack Horton | 19 | 0 | 1 | 0 | 20 | 0 |
| HB | (England) Albert Millard | 1 | 0 | 0 | 0 | 1 | 0 |
| FB | (England) Harold Oliver | 1 | 0 | 0 | 0 | 1 | 0 |
| FW | (England) Tom Pearson | 22 | 11 | 4 | 1 | 26 | 12 |
| HB | (England) Charlie Perry | 20 | 0 | 4 | 0 | 24 | 0 |
| FW | (England) Walter Perry | 9 | 4 | 4 | 6 | 13 | 10 |
| FB | (England) Alexander Ramsey | 1 | 0 | 0 | 0 | 1 | 0 |
| GK | (England) Bob Roberts | 22 | 0 | 4 | 0 | 26 | 0 |
| FW | (England) Charlie Shaw | 1 | 1 | 0 | 0 | 1 | 1 |
| HB | (England) George Timmins | 22 | 0 | 4 | 1 | 26 | 1 |
| FB | (England) Luther Walker | 12 | 0 | 0 | 0 | 12 | 0 |
| FW | (England) Joe Wilson | 20 | 4 | 4 | 5 | 24 | 9 |
| FW | (England) George Woodhall | 10 | 3 | 0 | 0 | 10 | 3 |

== See also ==
- 1888–89 in English football
- List of West Bromwich Albion F.C. seasons
