= 1889–90 West Bromwich Albion F.C. season =

West Bromwich Albion
1889–90 season
- Chairman: Edward W. Heelis
- Manager: None (Note: Albion did not have a secretary-manager until 1890 and did not appoint a full-time manager until 1948.)
- Stadium: Stoney Lane
- Football League: 5th
- FA Cup: First round
- Top goalscorer: League: Tom Pearson (17); All: Tom Pearson (17)
Home colours

The 1889–90 season was the 12th season in the history of West Bromwich Albion and their second season in the Football League. Albion finished the season in 5th position.

== Final League table ==
| Pos | Team | Pld | W | D | L | GF | GA | GAv | Pts |
|---|---|---|---|---|---|---|---|---|---|
| 3 | Blackburn Rovers | 22 | 12 | 3 | 7 | 78 | 41 | 1.902 | 27 |
| 4 | Wolverhampton Wanderers | 22 | 10 | 5 | 7 | 51 | 38 | 1.342 | 25 |
| 5 | West Bromwich Albion | 22 | 11 | 3 | 8 | 47 | 50 | 0.940 | 25 |
| 6 | Accrington | 22 | 9 | 6 | 7 | 53 | 56 | 0.946 | 24 |
| 7 | Derby County | 22 | 9 | 3 | 10 | 43 | 55 | 0.782 | 21 |

Source: World Football
Rules for classification: 1) Points; 2) Goal average; 3) Goals scored

== Results ==
West Bromwich Albion's score comes first

=== Legend ===
| Win | Draw | Loss |

=== Football League ===
| Match | Date | Opponent | Venue | Result | Attendance | Scorers |
|---|---|---|---|---|---|---|
| 1 | 14 September 1889 | Derby County | A | 1–3 | 6,000 | Bayliss |
| 2 | 21 September 1889 | Notts County | A | 2–1 | 6,200 | Pearson, Bayliss |
| 3 | 28 September 1889 | Aston Villa | H | 3–0 | 10,122 | Woodhall, Wilson, Bayliss |
| 4 | 5 October 1889 | Preston North End | A | 0–5 | 10,000 | |
| 5 | 12 October 1889 | Burnley | A | 2–1 | 6,000 | Wilson, Pittaway |
| 6 | 19 October 1889 | Wolverhampton Wanderers | H | 1–4 | 1,550 | Evans |
| 7 | 26 October 1889 | Aston Villa | A | 0–1 | 8,000 | |
| 8 | 4 November 1889 | Bolton Wanderers | H | 6–3 | 4,813 | Pearson (4), Bassett, Woodhall |
| 9 | 9 November 1889 | Derby County | H | 2–3 | 5,100 | Wilson, Bassett |
| 10 | 16 November 1889 | Stoke | A | 3–1 | 3,900 | Pearson, Perry, Evans |
| 11 | 23 November 1889 | Burnley | H | 6–1 | 7,100 | Bayliss (2), Haynes, Bassett, Evans, Pearson |
| 12 | 30 November 1889 | Blackburn Rovers | A | 0–5 | 6,600 | |
| 13 | 7 December 1889 | Bolton Wanderers | A | 0–7 | 3,500 | |
| 14 | 21 December 1889 | Accrington | H | 4–1 | 3,500 | Pearson (3), Bayliss |
| 15 | 26 December 1889 | Preston North End | H | 2–2 | 10,065 | Evans, Pearson |
| 16 | 28 December 1889 | Wolverhampton Wanderers | A | 1–1 | 8,500 | Pearson |
| 17 | 4 January 1890 | Notts County | H | 4–2 | 4,700 | Bayliss, Pearson (3) |
| 18 | 11 January 1890 | Blackburn Rovers | H | 3–2 | 5,100 | Evans (2), Bayliss |
| 19 | 8 February 1890 | Accrington | A | 0–0 | 2,100 | |
| 20 | 8 March 1890 | Everton | A | 1–5 | 8,400 | Pearson |
| 21 | 15 March 1890 | Stoke | H | 2–1 | 1,600 | Woodhall, Bayliss |
| 22 | 22 March 1890 | Everton | H | 4–1 | 4,000 | Evans (2), Pearson, Wilson |

=== FA Cup ===
| Round | Date | Opponent | Venue | Result | Attendance | Scorers |
|---|---|---|---|---|---|---|
| R1 | 18 January 1890 | Accrington | A | 1–3 | 3,400 | Wilson |
| R1 (Note: Match was replayed after Albion appealed about the state of the pitch.) | 25 January 1890 | Accrington | A | 0–3 | 5,300 | |

== Appearances ==
| Pos. | Name | League | | FA Cup | | Total | |
| Pos. | Name | Apps | Goals | Apps | Goals | Apps | Goals |
|---|---|---|---|---|---|---|---|
| FW | (England) Billy Bassett | 19 | 3 | 2 | 0 | 21 | 3 |
| U | (England) Jem Bayliss | 19 | 9 | 2 | 0 | 21 | 9 |
| FW | (England) James Pittaway | 1 | 1 | 0 | 0 | 1 | 1 |
| FB | (England) Harry Green | 18 | 0 | 1 | 0 | 19 | 0 |
| FW | (England) George Haynes | 2 | 1 | 0 | 0 | 2 | 1 |
| HB | (England) Ezra Horton | 22 | 0 | 2 | 0 | 24 | 0 |
| FB | (England) Jack Horton | 17 | 0 | 2 | 0 | 19 | 0 |
| HB | (England) Albert Millard | 2 | 0 | 0 | 0 | 2 | 0 |
| FW | (England) Tom Pearson | 22 | 17 | 2 | 0 | 24 | 17 |
| HB | (England) Charlie Perry | 21 | 1 | 2 | 0 | 23 | 1 |
| FW | (England) Joe Wilson | 20 | 4 | 2 | 1 | 22 | 5 |
| FW | (England) George Woodhall | 11 | 3 | 0 | 0 | 11 | 3 |
| FW | (England) Sammy Nicholls | 2 | 0 | 0 | 0 | 2 | 0 |
| GK | (England) Bob Roberts | 18 | 0 | 2 | 0 | 20 | 0 |
| DF | (Wales) Seth Powell | 4 | 0 | 1 | 0 | 5 | 0 |
| DF | (England) Luther Walker | 6 | 0 | 0 | 0 | 6 | 0 |
| HB | (Scotland) Charles Donnachie | 2 | 0 | 0 | 0 | 2 | 0 |
| GK | (England) Joe Reader | 4 | 0 | 0 | 0 | 4 | 0 |
| HB | (England) George Timmins | 12 | 0 | 0 | 0 | 12 | 0 |
| FW | (England) George Evans | 13 | 8 | 2 | 0 | 15 | 8 |

== See also ==
- 1889–90 in English football
- List of West Bromwich Albion F.C. seasons
