= 1887–88 West Bromwich Albion F.C. season =

West Bromwich Albion
1887–88 season
- Chairman: Henry Jackson/Edward W. Heelis (Note: Heelis succeeded Jackson at some point during 1888, but the source does not specify whether this was during 1887–88 or 1888–89.)
- Manager: None (Note: Albion did not have a secretary-manager until 1890 and did not appoint a full-time manager until 1948.)
- Stadium: Stoney Lane
- FA Cup: Winners
- Birmingham Senior Cup: Runners-up
- Staffordshire Senior Cup: Runners-up
- Walsall Senior Cup: Winners
- West Bromwich Charity Cup: Winners
- Top goalscorer: League: N/A (Note: There was no league football in England until 1888–89.); All: Jem Bayliss (25) (Note: Includes all matches in the FA Cup, Birmingham Senior Cup, Staffordshire Senior Cup, and West Bromwich Charity Cup. Only the first round second replay of the Walsall Senior Cup is included, since all other matches in the competition were contested by Albion's reserve team.)
- Highest home attendance: 9,093 (vs Stoke, 7 January 1888)
- Lowest home attendance: 2,484 (vs Wednesbury Old Athletic, 15 October 1887)
- Average home league attendance: 5,757
Home colours

The 1887–88 season was the 10th season in the history of West Bromwich Albion Football Club. The club reached the FA Cup final for the third successive season and won the competition for the first time, beating Preston North End 2–1. Albion also competed in four local cup competitions, winning the Walsall Senior Cup and West Bromwich Charity Cup and finishing as runners-up in the Birmingham Senior Cup and Staffordshire Senior Cup. Due to a congested fixture list, the club refused to take part in the Birmingham Charity Cup.

== FA Cup ==
West Bromwich Albion began their fifth season in the FA Cup with a 7–1 first round victory against Wednesbury Old Athletic, including a hat-trick from Jem Bayliss. Bayliss also scored the only goal of the second round match away at Mitchell St George's. Albion defeated Midlands rivals Wolverhampton Wanderers (2–0) in round three. After receiving a bye in the fourth round, Albion faced Stoke in round five. Bayliss scored all four of Albion's goals in a 4–1 victory, becoming the first Albion player to score four in an FA Cup game. Old Carthusians were defeated 4–2 in the quarter-final.

The semi-final took place at Stoke's Victoria Ground and saw Albion beat Derby Junction 3–0. Goals from Bayliss, Wilson and Woodhall saw Albion reach the final for the third year running. In the final, the team faced Preston North End at the Kennington Oval in front of 18,904 spectators. Billy Bassett crossed the ball for Bayliss to put Albion ahead, his 10th goal of the competition. Preston equalised just after half-time, but Bassett's pass set up Woodhall for the winning goal and Albion's first major honour. Upon their return to West Bromwich, the players were greeted by thousands of supporters as they drove through the town in a "four-horse brake".

Round	Date	Opponent	Venue	Result (Note: West Bromwich Albion's score is listed first, regardless of venue or result.)	Goalscorers	Attendance
1	15 October 1887	Wednesbury Old Athletic	H	7–1	Bayliss 3, Wilson 2, Pearson, E. Horton	2,484
2	5 November 1887	Mitchell St George's	A	1–0	Bayliss	7,800
3	26 November 1887	Wolverhampton Wanderers	H	2–0	Bassett, Wilson	7,429
4	Albion received a bye to the fifth round					
5	7 January 1888	Stoke	H	4–1	Bayliss 4	9,093
6	28 January 1888	Old Carthusians	H	4–2	Pearson 2, Wilson 2	8,818
SF	18 February 1888	Derby Junction	N	3–0	Bayliss, Wilson, Woodhall	5,996
F	24 March 1888	Preston North End	N	2–1	Bayliss, Woodhall	18,904

Source for match details:

== Birmingham Senior Cup ==
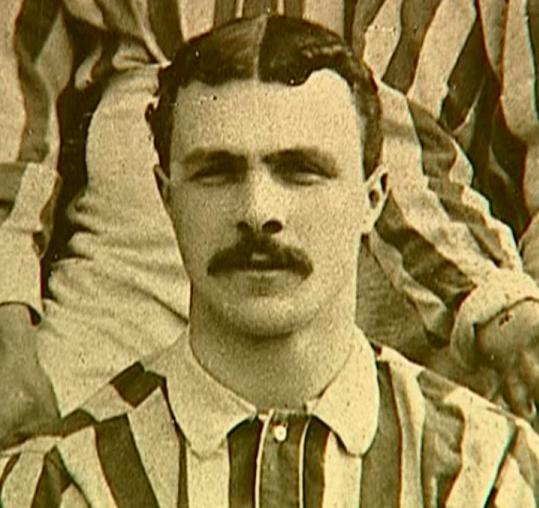
Joe Wilson scored in the semi-finals of four cup competitions.

In what was their seventh Birmingham Senior Cup campaign, Albion beat Small Heath Alliance in the first round, with both goals scored by Jem Bayliss. There followed victories over Burslem Port Vale, Aston Shakespeare and Mitchell St. George's. Goals from Joe Wilson and George Timmins were enough to see off Wolverhampton Wanderers in the semi-final, a result that meant that Albion had reached the final without having conceded a goal, and was their third Birmingham Senior Cup final in as many seasons. Pearson scored twice for Albion in the final at Aston Lower Grounds, but it was Aston Villa who ran out winners, by a 3–2 scoreline.

Round	Date	Opponent	Venue	Result	Goalscorers	Attendance
1	8 October 1887	Small Heath Alliance	H	2–0	Bayliss 2	4,000
2	31 October 1887	Burslem Port Vale	A	3–0	Askin, Bayliss, J. Horton	2,500
3	19 November 1887	Aston Shakespeare	H	3–0	G. Bell, Woodhall 2	3,500
4	24 December 1887	Mitchell St. George's	H	4–0	Wilson 2, Pearson, Woodhall	4,500
SF	11 February 1888	Wolverhampton Wanderers	H	2–0	Wilson, Timmins	5,000
F	3 March 1888	Aston Villa	N	2–3	Pearson 2	12,000

Source for match details:

== Staffordshire Senior Cup ==
West Bromwich Albion recorded their biggest win of the season by defeating Burton Wanderers 12–2 in the first round of the 1887–88 Staffordshire Senior Cup, including hat-tricks from Woodhall and Bayliss. They then beat Wednesbury Old Athletic (2–1) and Leek (3–2) respectively. The club won away from home for the fourth time in succession when they beat Stoke in the semi-final; a Joe Wilson goal was enough to secure the victory for Albion.

Albion were participating in the competition for the sixth time and aiming to win the trophy for a third season in succession. The final against Wolverhampton Wanderers required two replays to determine a winner: after 0–0 and 1–1 draws, both played at Stoke, Albion lost the second replay 1–2 at home, despite Woodhall's seventh goal of the competition.

Round	Date	Opponent	Venue	Result	Goalscorers	Attendance
1	1 October 1887	Burton Wanderers	A	12–2	Black (o.g.), Woodhall 3, Pearson 2, Bayliss 3, Wilson, Bassett 2	3,500
2	28 November 1887	Wednesbury Old Athletic	A	2–1	Woodhall, Bayliss	3,000
3	31 December 1887	Leek	A	3–2	Woodhall, Pearson, Wilson	2,700
SF	17 March 1888	Stoke	A	1–0	Wilson	5,500
F	31 March 1887	Wolverhampton Wanderers	N	0–0	—	8,000
F(R)	14 April 1888	Wolverhampton Wanderers	N	1–1 (Note: After extra time.)	Woodhall	8,500
F(2R)	28 April 1888	Wolverhampton Wanderers	H	1–2	Woodhall	7,000

Source for match details:

== Walsall Senior Cup ==
West Bromwich Albion usually put out their reserves for the Walsall Senior Cup. However, after two draws against Oldbury Town in the first round, it was decided that the first team should participate in the second replay. Albion won the match 5–1, before the second team took over once more, beating Walsall Swifts in the final by a 4–1 scoreline.

Round	Date	Opponent	Venue	Result	Goalscorers	Attendance
1 (2R)	12 December 1887	Oldbury Town	A	5–1	Bayliss 3, Askin, H. Green	1,000

Source for match details:

== West Bromwich Charity Cup ==
Taking part in the West Bromwich Charity Cup for the first time, Albion defeated Wednesbury Old Athletic 4–1 in the semi-final, which saw "skirmishes" between the two sets of supporters. In the final, the club recorded their second biggest win of the season, beating Great Bridge Unity 10–1.

Round	Date	Opponent	Venue	Result	Goalscorers	Attendance
SF	7 May 1888	Wednesbury Old Athletic	H	4–1	Wilson, Bayliss, Woodhall 2	5,000
F	21 May 1888	Great Bridge Unity	H	10–1	Bayliss 4, Wilson 2, Bassett 2, Woodhall, H. Green	6,500

Source for match details:

== Friendlies and benefit matches ==
With league football yet to be established, West Bromwich Albion played in a number of friendly matches throughout the season.

Date	Opponent	Venue	Result
27 August 1887	Oldbury Town Crosswells	A	1–0
3 September 1887	Sheffield Wednesday	H	4–1
10 September 1887	Third Lanark Rifle Volunteers	A	0–2
17 September 1887	Stoke	H	4–0
24 September 1887	Bolton Wanderers	A	1–1
3 October 1887	Notts County (Note: The source refers to the team as Nottingham County.)	H	5–1
17 October 1887	Walsall Town	H	8–0
22 October 1887	Blackburn Rovers	A	6–7
29 October 1887	Lincoln City	H	4–1
7 November 1887	Bolton Wanderers	H	6–0
12 November 1887	Preston North End	A	2–4
14 November 1887	Brierley Hill Alliance (Note: Benefit match for Brockmoor Colliery Relief Fund)	A	3–0
21 November 1887	Oxford University	A	6–2
3 December 1887	Burnley	H	3–0
5 December 1887	Cambridge University	H	5–0
10 December 1887	Lincoln City	A	6–1
17 December 1887	Long Eaton Rangers	H	3–1
26 December 1887	Wolverhampton Wanderers	H	1–1
14 January 1888	Notts County	A	3–3
21 January 1888	Wolverhampton Wanderers	A	5–0
4 February 1888	Oxford University	A	5–0
25 February 1888	Aston Villa	H	4–1
27 February 1888	Cambridge University	A	6–1
10 March 1888	Aston Villa	A	4–0
2 April 1888	Third Lanark Rifle Volunteers	A	0–3
3 April 1888	Newcastle West End	A	5–1
7 April 1888	Everton	A	1–0
16 April 1888	Burnley	A	1–0
21 April 1888	Preston North End	H	2–2
5 May 1888	Blackburn Rovers	H	2–1
12 May 1888	Third Lanark Rifle Volunteers	H	5–2
19 May 1888	Renton (Note: This match was played to decide the 'Championship of the World'.)	N	1–4
22 May 1888	Walsall Town Swifts (Note: Benefit match for R. Roberts)	H	3–0
26 May 1888	Aston Villa	A	1–1
28 May 1888	Preston North End	A	0–2

Source for match details:

== See also ==
- 1887–88 in English football
