= 1891–92 West Bromwich Albion F.C. season =

West Bromwich Albion
1891–92 season
- Chairman: Henry Jackson/George Salter
- Manager: Louis Ford
- Stadium: Stoney Lane
- Football League: 12th
- FA Cup: Winners
- Top goalscorer: League: Tom Pearson (13); All: Tom Pearson (16)
Home colours

The 1891–92 season was the 14th season in the history of West Bromwich Albion and their fourth season in the Football League. Albion finished the season in 12th position.

== Final League table ==
Pos	Team	Pld	W	D	L	GF	GA	GAv	Pts	Qualification
10	Derby County	26	10	4	12	46	52	0.885	24	
11	Accrington	26	8	4	14	40	78	0.513	20	Re-elected
12	West Bromwich Albion	26	6	6	14	51	58	0.879	18	FA Cup Winners (Note: FA Cup winners — no re-election required)
13	Stoke (Note: New club in the league)	26	5	4	17	38	61	0.623	14	Re-elected
14	Darwen	26	4	3	19	38	112	0.339	11	Failed re-election (Note: Not re-elected, invited to join Second Division.)

== Results ==
West Bromwich Albion's score comes first

=== Legend ===
Win	Draw	Loss

=== Football League ===
Match	Date	Opponent	Venue	Result	Attendance	Scorers
1	5 September 1891	Everton	H	4–0	6,000	Nicholls, Groves, McLeod (2)
2	12 September 1891	Aston Villa	A	1–5	12,100	Pearson
3	19 September 1891	Wolverhampton Wanderers	H	4–3	10,000	Groves (2), Nicholls, C. Perry
4	3 October 1891	Blackburn Rovers	H	2–2	4,700	Pearson, Nicholls
5	10 October 1891	Notts County	A	0–4	4,000	
6	17 October 1891	Sunderland	H	2–5	5,500	McLeod, Bassett
7	24 October 1891	Sunderland	A	0–4	6,000	
8	31 October 1891	Notts County	H	2–2	5,200	Pearson (2)
9	2 November 1891	Bolton Wanderers	H	0–2	6,700	
10	7 November 1891	Everton	A	3–4	8,100	Bassett (2), Pearson
11	14 November 1891	Aston Villa	H	0–3	14,085	
12	21 November 1891	Preston North End	H	1–2	13,000	Geddes
13	28 November 1891	Burnley	A	2–3	8,000	Bassett, Geddes
14	5 December 1891	Accrington	H	3–1	6,000	Woodhall, Pearson, Geddes
15	12 December 1891	Derby County	H	4–2	5,800	Woodhall, Pearson, Geddes (2)
16	19 December 1891	Bolton Wanderers	A	1–1	7,000	McLeod
17	26 December 1891	Burnley	H	1–0	5,000	Pearson
18	28 December 1891	Wolverhampton Wanderers	A	1–2	7,200	Rose (o.g.)
19	9 January 1892	Preston North End	A	0–1	6,400	
20	23 January 1892	Accrington	A	2–4	4,200	Nicholls, Pearson
21	6 February 1892	Derby County	A	1–1	7,300	Nicholls
22	12 March 1892	Blackburn Rovers	A	2–3	6,000	McLeod (2)
23	4 April 1892	Darwen	H	12–0	1,100	Pearson (4), Reynolds (2), Bassett (3), Hunt (o.g.), Geddes, Nicholls
24	11 April 1892	Stoke	H	2–2	10,000	T. Perry (2)
25	16 April 1892	Darwen	A	1–1	3,000	Nicholls
26	23 April 1892	Stoke	A	0–1	5,400	

=== FA Cup ===
Round	Date	Opponent	Venue	Result	Attendance	Scorers
R1	16 January 1892	Old Westminsters	A	3–2	10,000	McLeod, Pearson, Reynolds
R2	30 January 1892	Blackburn Rovers	H	3–1	12,135	Pearson (2), Geddes
R3	13 February 1892	Sheffield Wednesday	H	2–1	10,477	C. Perry, Nicholls
SF	27 February 1892	Nottingham Forest	N	1–1	21,076	Geddes
SF (replay)	5 March 1892	Nottingham Forest	N	1–1	15,930	Bassett
SF (2nd replay)	9 March 1892	Nottingham Forest	N	6–2	8,024	Geddes (3), Bassett, Groves, C. Perry
F	19 March 1892	Aston Villa F.C.	N	3–0	32,710	Geddes, Nicholls, Reynolds

== See also ==
- 1891–92 in English football
- List of West Bromwich Albion F.C. seasons
