= List of West Bromwich Albion F.C. seasons =

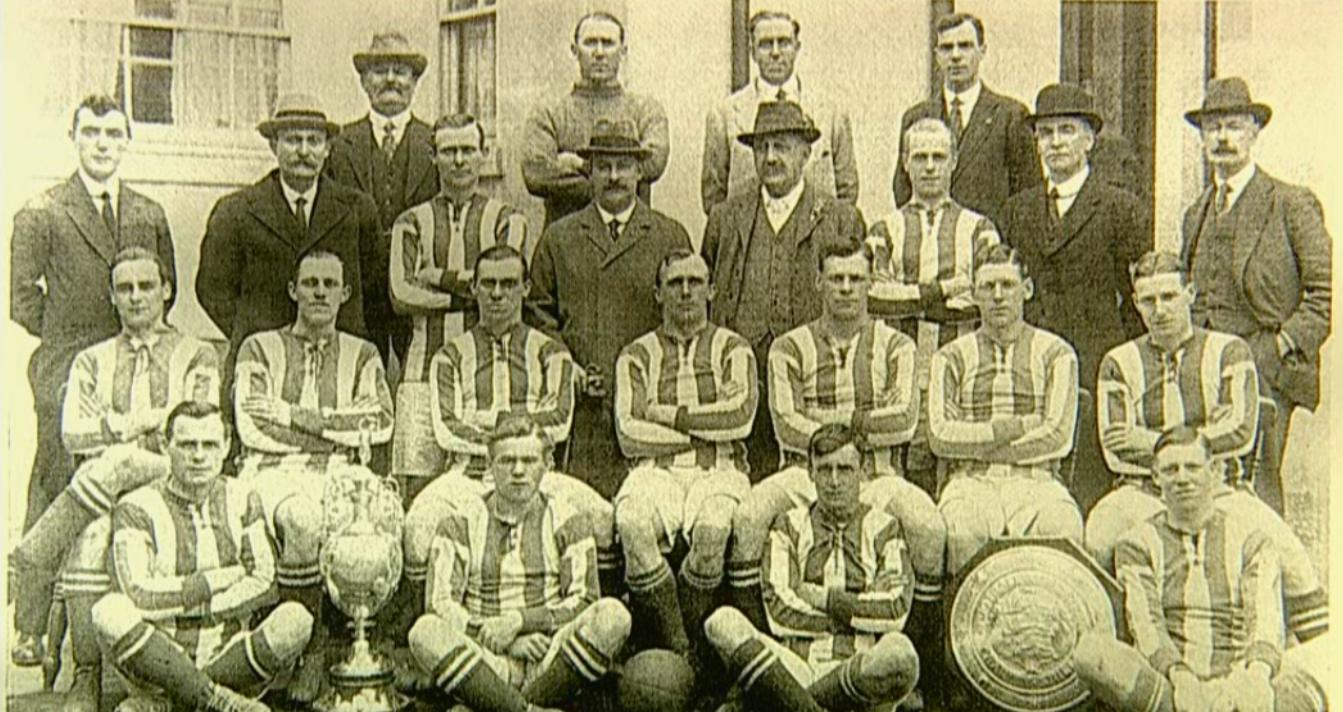
The West Bromwich Albion team that won the League Championship and Charity Shield in 1919–20

West Bromwich Albion Football Club was founded as West Bromwich Strollers in 1878 by workers from George Salter's Spring Works and turned professional in 1885. Albion won the FA Cup for the first time in 1888 and later that year became one of the founder members of the Football League. In the 1900–01 season, the club moved to its current home ground, The Hawthorns. Albion have spent the majority of their history – 81 of 126 seasons – in the top division of English football, including 24 consecutive seasons between 1949–50 and 1972–73. From 1986–87 to 2001–02, they spent sixteen consecutive seasons outside the top division, recording their lowest ever league finish of seventh in Division Three in 1991–92. Albion have been promoted eleven times and relegated twelve times, with seven of the 23 changes of division coming between 2002 and 2010. The team played in the Premier League for the first time in 2002–03.

Chart of West Bromwich Albion Performances

Albion have won the League Championship once, the FA Cup five times, the League Cup once and the Charity Shield twice, one of which was shared. They have been runners-up in the League Championship twice, in the FA Cup five times and in the League Cup twice. In European competitions, Albion have reached the quarter-final stage of both the Cup Winners' Cup and UEFA Cup.

The club has played more than one hundred seasons since their first entry in the FA Cup in 1883–84. The table details the club's achievements in all national and European first team competitions, and records their top league goalscorer, for each completed season. Records of locally organised cup competitions such as the Birmingham Senior Cup and Staffordshire Senior Cup, which have permitted reserve teams from the 1900s onwards, are not included.

== Seasons ==
=== Key ===
Key to league record:

- Pld = Matches played
- W = Matches won
- D = Matches drawn
- L = Matches lost
- GF = Goals for
- GA = Goals against
- Pts = Points
- Pos = Final position

Key to divisions:

- FL = Football League
- Div 1 = Football League First Division
- Div 2 = Football League Second Division
- Div 3 = Football League Third Division
- Prem = Premier League
- Chmp = EFL Championship
- N/A = Not applicable

Key to rounds:

- DNE = Did not enter
- QR = Qualifying round
- Grp = Group stage
- R1 = Round 1
- R2 = Round 2
- R3 = Round 3
- R4 = Round 4
- R5 = Round 5
- QF = Quarter-finals
- SF = Semi-finals
- ASF = Area semi-finals
- AF = Area final
- RU = Runners-up
- WS = Shared
- W = Winners

Winners	Runners-up	Promoted	Relegated

Divisions in bold indicate a change in division.
Players in bold indicate the top scorer in the division that season.

Season	League									FA Cup	EFL Cup	Europe / Other		Top league goalscorer(s) (Note: Goals in regular league competition only, excluding play-offs or test matches. Sourced from Matthews (2007) up to and including the 2006–07 season.)		Average league attendance
Season	Division (tier)	Pld	W	D	L	GF	GA	Pts	Pos	FA Cup	EFL Cup	Europe / Other		Player(s)	Goals	Average league attendance
1883–84	N/A									R1						
1884–85	N/A									QF						
1885–86	N/A									RU						
1886–87	N/A									RU						
1887–88	N/A									**W**						
1888–89	FL (Note: West Bromwich Albion were one of the twelve founding members of the Football League.)	22	10	2	10	40	46	22	6th	SF				Billy Bassett Tom Pearson	11	4,437
1889–90	FL	22	11	3	8	47	50	25	5th	R1				Tom Pearson	17	5,741
1890–91	FL	22	5	2	15	34	57	12	12th	SF				Tom Pearson	13	5,056
1891–92	FL	26	6	6	14	51	58	18	12th	**W**				Tom Pearson	13	7,700
1892–93	Div 1 (Note: The Football League expanded to two divisions in 1892, absorbing most of the teams from the Football Alliance. The league previously known simply as the Football League became the Football League First Division.) (1)	30	12	5	13	58	69	29	8th	R1				Billy Bassett Tom Pearson	11	5,113
1893–94	Div 1 (1)	30	14	4	12	66	59	32	8th	R1				Roddy McLeod	14	5,257
1894–95	Div 1 (1)	30	10	4	16	51	66	24	13th	RU				Tom Hutchinson	15	6,654
1895–96	Div 1 (1)	30	6	7	17	30	59	19	16th (Note: Albion retained their place in Division One by winning two and drawing one of four test matches, playing home and away against Manchester City and Liverpool.)	R3				Roddy McLeod Billy Richards	6	6,215
1896–97	Div 1 (1)	30	10	6	14	33	56	26	12th	R2				Albert Flewitt	6	6,190
1897–98	Div 1 (1)	30	11	10	9	44	45	32	7th	R3				Ben Garfield	12	7,013
1898–99	Div 1 (1)	34	12	6	16	42	57	30	14th	R3				Billy Richards	10	5,350
1899–1900	Div 1 (1)	34	11	8	15	43	51	30	13th	R3				Chippy Simmons	12	5,695
1900–01	Div 1 (1) ↓	34	7	8	19	35	62	22	18th	SF				Dick Roberts Chippy Simmons	5	13,090
1901–02	**Div 2 (2)** ↑	34	25	5	4	82	29	55	**1st**	R1				**Chippy Simmons**	23	7,822
1902–03	**Div 1 (1)**	34	16	4	14	54	53	36	7th	R1				Billy Lee	10	17,128
1903–04	Div 1 (1) ↓	34	7	10	17	36	60	24	18th	R1				Chippy Simmons	8	13,356
1904–05	**Div 2 (2)**	34	13	4	17	56	48	30	10th	QR				Walter Jack	13	4,884
1905–06	Div 2 (2)	38	22	8	8	79	36	52	4th	R1				Adam Haywood	21	8,637
1906–07	Div 2 (2)	38	21	5	12	83	45	47	4th	SF				**Fred Shinton**	28	12,652
1907–08	Div 2 (2)	38	19	9	10	61	39	47	5th	R2				Fred Buck	18	11,469
1908–09	Div 2 (2)	38	19	13	6	56	27	51	3rd (Note: Albion missed out on promotion on goal average, by 0.0056 of a goal.)	R2				Charlie Hewitt	15	18,644
1909–10	Div 2 (2)	38	16	5	17	58	56	37	11th	R3				Fred Buck	16	12,021
1910–11	Div 2 (2) ↑	38	22	9	7	67	41	53	**1st**	R2				Sid Bowser	22	16,601
1911–12	**Div 1 (1)**	38	15	9	14	43	47	39	9th	RU				Bob Pailor	10	19,358
1912–13	Div 1 (1)	38	13	12	13	57	50	38	10th	R1				Bob Pailor	16	18,280
1913–14	Div 1 (1)	38	15	13	10	46	42	43	5th	R3				Alf Bentley	16	21,734
1914–15	Div 1 (1)	38	15	10	13	49	43	40	10th	R1				Fred Morris	11	11,403
The Football League and FA Cup were suspended until after the First World War.
1919–20	Div 1 (1)	42	28	4	10	104	47	60	**1st**	R1		Charity Shield (Note: The Charity Shield was first played for in 1908. In its early years, the match took place at the end of the season, but was subsequently moved to September or October of the following season. From 1959 onwards it has been played in August, prior to the beginning of the league programme. It was renamed the FA Community Shield in 2002.)	**W**	**Fred Morris**	37	31,968
1920–21	Div 1 (1)	42	13	14	15	54	58	40	14th	R1				Fred Morris	16	30,024
1921–22	Div 1 (1)	42	15	10	17	51	63	40	13th	R3				Stan Davies	14	23,673
1922–23	Div 1 (1)	42	17	11	14	58	49	45	7th	R3				Stan Davies	20	19,960
1923–24	Div 1 (1)	42	12	14	16	51	62	38	16th	R4				Bobby Blood	9	18,620
1924–25	Div 1 (1)	42	23	10	9	58	34	56	2nd	R4				George James	25	23,167
1925–26	Div 1 (1)	42	16	8	18	79	78	40	13th	R4				Stan Davies	19	19,860
1926–27	Div 1 (1) ↓	42	11	8	23	65	86	30	22nd	R3				Joe Carter Stan Davies	15	21,710
1927–28	**Div 2 (2)**	42	17	12	13	90	70	46	8th	R3				**Jimmy Cookson**	38	20,263
1928–29	Div 2 (2)	42	19	8	15	80	79	46	7th	QF				Jimmy Cookson Tommy Glidden	21	13,696
1929–30	Div 2 (2)	42	21	5	16	105	73	47	6th	R3				Jimmy Cookson	33	14,900
1930–31 (Note: West Bromwich Albion completed the "double" of winning the FA Cup and promotion in the same season. As of May 2008 they remain the only English club to have achieved this feat.)	Div 2 (2) ↑	42	22	10	10	83	49	54	2nd	**W**				W. G. Richardson	18	23,389
1931–32	**Div 1 (1)**	42	20	6	16	77	55	46	6th	R3		Charity Shield	RU	W. G. Richardson	27	25,404
1932–33	Div 1 (1)	42	20	9	13	83	70	49	4th	R4				W. G. Richardson	30	24,247
1933–34	Div 1 (1)	42	17	10	15	78	70	44	7th	R3				W. G. Richardson	26	21,488
1934–35	Div 1 (1)	42	17	10	15	83	83	44	9th	RU				W. G. Richardson	25	23,767
1935–36	Div 1 (1)	42	16	6	20	89	88	38	18th	R4				**W. G. Richardson**	39 (Note: Club record for most league goals (39) and most goals in total (40) scored in a season.)	24,616
1936–37	Div 1 (1)	42	16	6	20	77	98	38	16th	SF				Harry Jones	17	23,277
1937–38	Div 1 (1) ↓	42	14	8	20	74	91	36	22nd	R4				W. G. Richardson	15	23,829
1938–39	**Div 2 (2)**	42	18	9	15	89	72	45	10th	R4				Harry Jones	18	19,611
1939–40 (Note: The 1939–40 season was abandoned in early September and all results annulled. Albion's record at the time of the annulment was P3 W1 D1 L1 F8 A8 Pts3.)	Div 2 (2)															
The Football League and FA Cup were suspended until after the Second World War.
1945–46	n/a (Note: The FA Cup was contested in 1945–46 but the Football League did not resume until the following season.)									R4						
1946–47	Div 2 (2)	42	20	8	14	88	75	48	7th	R4				Dave Walsh	28	28,621
1947–48	Div 2 (2)	42	18	9	15	63	58	45	7th	R4				Dave Walsh	22	31,618
1948–49	Div 2 (2) ↑	42	24	8	10	69	39	56	2nd	QF				Dave Walsh	23	34,379
1949–50	**Div 1 (1)**	42	14	12	16	47	53	40	14th	R3				Dave Walsh	15	39,588
1950–51	Div 1 (1)	42	13	11	18	53	61	37	16th	R3				Ronnie Allen	10	32,245
1951–52	Div 1 (1)	42	14	13	15	74	77	41	13th	R5				Ronnie Allen	32	30,332
1952–53	Div 1 (1)	42	21	8	13	66	60	50	4th	R4				Ronnie Allen	20	32,701
1953–54	Div 1 (1)	42	22	9	11	86	63	53	2nd	**W**				Johnny Nicholls	28	40,083
1954–55	Div 1 (1)	42	16	8	18	76	96	40	17th	R4		Charity Shield	**WS** (Note: From 1939 to 1993, in the event of a draw, the Charity Shield would be shared between the two competing teams, with each team having possession of the trophy for six months.)	**Ronnie Allen**	27	32,859
1955–56	Div 1 (1)	42	18	5	19	58	70	41	13th	R5				Ronnie Allen	17	28,589
1956–57	Div 1 (1)	42	14	14	14	59	61	42	11th	SF				Derek Kevan	16	23,676
1957–58	Div 1 (1)	42	18	14	10	92	70	50	4th	QF				Bobby Robson	24	33,741
1958–59	Div 1 (1)	42	18	13	11	88	68	49	5th	R5				Derek Kevan	26	33,189
1959–60	Div 1 (1)	42	19	11	12	83	57	49	4th	R5				Derek Kevan	26	28,362
1960–61	Div 1 (1)	42	18	5	19	67	71	41	10th	R3	DNE (Note: The League Cup started in 1960–61. Most First Division clubs took part in it from the first season, but Albion did not enter until 1965–66, when the FA offered the winners a place in the Inter-Cities Fairs Cup.)			Derek Kevan	18	26,088
1961–62	Div 1 (1)	42	15	13	14	83	67	43	9th	R5	DNE			**Derek Kevan** (Note: Kevan was joint-top Division One scorer with Ray Crawford of Ipswich Town.)	33	22,102
1962–63	Div 1 (1)	42	16	7	19	71	79	39	14th	R4	DNE			Alec Jackson Derek Kevan	14	19,547
1963–64	Div 1 (1)	42	16	11	15	70	61	43	10th	R4	DNE			Clive Clark	16	22,362
1964–65	Div 1 (1)	42	13	13	16	70	65	39	14th	R3	DNE			Clive Clark	11	20,453
1965–66	Div 1 (1)	42	19	12	11	91	69	50	6th	R3	**W** (Note: Albion won the League Cup at their first attempt.)			Jeff Astle John Kaye	18	20,496
1966–67	Div 1 (1)	42	16	7	19	77	73	39	13th	R4	RU	Inter-Cities Fairs Cup	R3	Clive Clark	19	24,257
1967–68	Div 1 (1)	42	17	12	13	75	62	46	8th	**W**	R2			Jeff Astle	26	27,561
1968–69	Div 1 (1)	42	16	11	15	64	67	43	10th	SF	R3	Charity Shield	RU	Jeff Astle	21	26,582
1968–69	Div 1 (1)	42	16	11	15	64	67	43	10th	SF	R3	UEFA Cup Winners' Cup	QF	Jeff Astle	21	26,582
1969–70	Div 1 (1)	42	14	9	19	58	66	37	16th	R3	RU	Anglo-Italian Cup	Grp	**Jeff Astle**	25	28,591
1970–71	Div 1 (1)	42	10	15	17	58	75	35	17th	R4	R4	Anglo-Italian Cup	Grp	**Tony Brown**	28	26,606
1970–71	Div 1 (1)	42	10	15	17	58	75	35	17th	R4	R4	Texaco Cup	R1	**Tony Brown**	28	26,606
1971–72	Div 1 (1)	42	12	11	19	42	54	35	16th	R3	R2	Watney Cup	RU	Tony Brown	17	27,186
1972–73	Div 1 (1) ↓	42	9	10	23	38	62	28	22nd	R5	R3	Texaco Cup	R2	Tony Brown	12	22,340
1973–74	**Div 2 (2)**	42	14	16	12	48	45	44	8th	R5	R3			Tony Brown	19	16,466
1974–75	Div 2 (2)	42	18	9	15	54	42	45	6th	R4	R3	Texaco Cup	Grp	Tony Brown	12	12,805
1975–76	Div 2 (2) ↑	42	20	13	9	50	33	53	3rd	R5	R2	Anglo-Scottish Cup	Grp	Alistair Brown	10	17,955
1976–77	**Div 1 (1)**	42	16	13	13	62	56	45	7th	R3	R3	Anglo-Scottish Cup	Grp	David Cross	12	25,573
1977–78	Div 1 (1)	42	18	14	10	62	53	50	6th	SF	R4	Tennent Caledonian Cup	**W**	Tony Brown	19	24,521
1978–79	Div 1 (1)	42	24	11	7	72	35	59	3rd	R5	R2	UEFA Cup	QF	Alistair Brown	18	27,211
1978–79	Div 1 (1)	42	24	11	7	72	35	59	3rd	R5	R2	Tennent Caledonian Cup	SF (Note: Albion lost 2–0 to Heart of Midlothian in the third place play-off.)	Alistair Brown	18	27,211
1979–80	Div 1 (1)	42	11	19	12	54	50	41	10th	R3	R4	UEFA Cup	R1	Peter Barnes	15	23,214
1980–81	Div 1 (1)	42	20	12	10	60	42	52	4th	R4	QF			Cyrille Regis	14	21,236
1981–82	Div 1 (1)	42	11	11	20	46	57	44 (Note: The 1981–82 season saw the introduction of three points for a win instead of two.)	17th	SF	SF	UEFA Cup	R1	Cyrille Regis	17	17,694
1982–83	Div 1 (1)	42	15	12	15	51	49	57	11th	R4	R2			Cyrille Regis	9	15,966
1983–84	Div 1 (1)	42	14	9	19	48	62	51	17th	R5	R4			Garry Thompson	13	14,692
1984–85	Div 1 (1)	42	16	7	19	58	62	55	12th	R3	R4			Garry Thompson	19	14,470
1985–86	Div 1 (1) ↓	42	4	12	26	35	89	24	22nd	R3	R4	Full Members' Cup	ASF	Imre Varadi	9	12,306
1986–87	**Div 2 (2)**	42	13	12	17	51	49	51	15th	R3	R2	Full Members' Cup	R1	Garth Crooks	11	9,280
1987–88	Div 2 (2)	44	12	11	21	50	69	47	20th	R3	R1	Full Members' Cup	R2	Andy Gray	10	10,126
1988–89	Div 2 (2)	46	18	18	10	65	41	72	9th	R3	R1	Full Members' Cup	R1	Don Goodman	15	12,887
1989–90	Div 2 (2)	46	12	15	19	67	71	51	20th	R5	R4	Full Members' Cup	R1	Don Goodman	21	11,656
1990–91	Div 2 (2) ↓	46	10	18	18	52	61	48	23rd	R3	R1	Full Members' Cup	R1	Gary Bannister	13	12,136
1991–92	**Div 3 (3)**	46	19	14	13	64	49	71	7th (Note: Lowest League finish.)	R2	R1	Associate Members' Cup	R1	Gary Robson	9	12,711
1992–93	Div 2 (Note: With the advent of the Premier League, the third tier of English football became known as the Second Division.) (3) ↑	46	25	10	11	88	54	85	4th (Note: Promoted following 3–0 victory over Port Vale in the play-off final at the old Wembley Stadium.)	R3	R1	Football League Trophy	R3	**Bob Taylor**	30	15,781
1993–94	**Div 1 (2)**	46	13	12	21	60	69	51	21st	R1	R2	Anglo-Italian Cup	Grp	Bob Taylor	18	17,232
1994–95	Div 1 (2)	46	16	10	20	51	57	58	19th	R3	R1			Andy Hunt	13	15,304
1995–96	Div 1 (2)	46	16	12	18	60	68	60	11th	R3	R2	Anglo-Italian Cup	AF	Bob Taylor	17	15,367
1996–97	Div 1 (2)	46	14	15	17	68	72	57	16th	R3	R1			Andy Hunt Paul Peschisolido	15	15,269
1997–98	Div 1 (2)	46	16	13	17	50	56	61	10th	R4	R3			Lee Hughes	14	16,922
1998–99	Div 1 (2)	46	16	11	19	69	76	59	12th	R3	R1			**Lee Hughes**	31	14,900
1999–2000	Div 1 (2)	46	10	19	17	43	60	49	21st	R3	R3			Lee Hughes	12	14,719
2000–01	Div 1 (2)	46	21	11	14	60	52	74	6th (Note: Lost 5–2 on aggregate in play-off semi-finals to Bolton Wanderers.)	R3	R2			Lee Hughes	21	17,803
2001–02	Div 1 (2) ↑	46	27	8	11	61	29	89	2nd	QF	R3			Scott Dobie	10	21,052
2002–03	**Prem (1)** ↓	38	6	8	24	29	65	26	19th	R4	R2			Danny Dichio Scott Dobie	5	26,731
2003–04	**Div 1 (2)** ↑	46	25	11	10	64	42	86	2nd	R3	QF			Lee Hughes	11	24,785
2004–05	**Prem (1)**	38	6	16	16	36	61	34	17th	R4	R2			Robert Earnshaw	11	26,002
2005–06	Prem (1) ↓	38	7	9	22	31	58	30	19th	R3	R4			Nathan Ellington Nwankwo Kanu	5	25,419
2006–07	**Chmp** (Note: In 2004–05 the Football League First Division had been renamed the Football League Championship as part of a re-branding exercise by the Football League.) (2)	46	22	10	14	81	55	76	4th (Note: Lost 1–0 to Derby County in the play-off final at Wembley Stadium.)	R5	R3			Diomansy Kamara	20	20,763
2007–08	Chmp (2) ↑	46	23	12	11	88	55	81	**1st**	SF	R3			Kevin Phillips	22	22,311
2008–09	**Prem (1)** ↓	38	8	8	22	36	67	32	20th	R4	R2			Chris Brunt	8	25,828
2009–10	**Chmp (2)** ↑	46	26	13	7	89	48	91	2nd	R5	R3			Chris Brunt Graham Dorrans	13	22,199
2010–11	**Prem (1)**	38	12	11	15	56	71	47	11th	R3	QF			Peter Odemwingie	15	24,683
2011–12	Prem (1)	38	13	8	17	45	52	47	10th	R4	R3			Peter Odemwingie	10	24,903
2012–13	Prem (1)	38	14	7	17	53	57	49	8th	R3	R3			Romelu Lukaku	17	25,366
2013–14	Prem (1)	38	7	15	16	43	59	36	17th	R3	R3			Saido Berahino Stéphane Sessègnon	5	25,196
2014–15	Prem (1)	38	11	11	16	38	51	44	13th	QF	R4			Saido Berahino	14	25,064
2015–16	Prem (1)	38	10	13	15	34	48	43	14th	R5	R3			Salomón Rondón	9	24,631
2016–17	Prem (1)	38	12	9	17	43	51	45	10th	R3	R2			Salomón Rondón	8	23,876
2017–18	Prem (1) ↓	38	6	13	19	31	56	31	20th	R5	R3			Jay Rodriguez Salomón Rondón	7	24,520
2018–19	**Chmp (2)**	46	23	11	12	87	62	80	4th (Note: Lost 3–4 on penalties following a 1–1 draw on aggregate to Aston Villa in the play-off semi-finals.)	R4	R3			Dwight Gayle	23	24,148
2019–20	Chmp (2) ↑	46	22	17	7	77	45	83	2nd	R5	R1			Charlie Austin Hal Robson-Kanu	10	24,053 (Note: The remaining nine league fixtures of the 2019–20 season were played behind closed doors due to the COVID-19 pandemic in the United Kingdom.)
2020–21	**Prem (1)** ↓	38	5	11	22	35	76	26	19th	R3	R3			Matheus Pereira	11	5,371 (Note: All but one league fixtures of the 2020–21 season were played behind closed doors due to the COVID-19 pandemic in the United Kingdom.)
2021–22	**Chmp (2)**	46	18	13	15	52	45	67	10th	R3	R2			Karlan Grant	18	21,875
2022–23	Chmp (2)	46	18	12	16	59	53	66	9th	R4	R2			Brandon Thomas-Asante Daryl Dike	7	22,625
2023–24	Chmp (2)	46	21	12	13	70	47	75	5th (Note: Lost 3–1 on aggregate to Southampton in the play-off semi-finals)	R4	R1			Brandon Thomas-Asante	11	24,057
2024–25	Chmp (2)	46	15	19	12	57	47	64	9th	R3	R1			Josh Maja	12	25,057
2025–26	Chmp (2)	46	13	14	19	48	58	51 (Note: Deducted two points due to breaching PSR rules)	21st	R4	R1			Aune Heggebø Isaac Price	9	23,605

- Seasons spent at Level 1 of football league system: 81
- Seasons spent at Level 2 of football league system: 44
- Seasons spent at Level 3 of football league system: 2
- Seasons spent at Level 4 of football league system: 0
