= 1892–93 West Bromwich Albion F.C. season =

West Bromwich Albion's 15th season in Football League (1892-93)

West Bromwich Albion
1892–93 season
- Chairman: George Salter
- Manager: Louis Ford
- Stadium: Stoney Lane
- Football League: 8th
- FA Cup: First round
- Top goalscorer: League: Billy Bassett, Tom Pearson (11); All: Tom Pearson (12)
Home colours

The 1892–93 season was the 15th season in the history of West Bromwich Albion and their 5th season in the Football League. Albion finished the season in 8th position.

== Final League table ==
| Pos | Team | Pld | W | D | L | GF | GA | GAv | Pts |
|---|---|---|---|---|---|---|---|---|---|
| 6 | Burnley | 30 | 13 | 4 | 13 | 51 | 44 | 1.159 | 30 |
| 7 | Stoke | 30 | 12 | 5 | 13 | 58 | 48 | 1.208 | 29 |
| 8 | West Bromwich Albion | 30 | 12 | 5 | 13 | 58 | 69 | 0.841 | 29 |
| 9 | Blackburn Rovers | 30 | 8 | 13 | 9 | 47 | 56 | 0.839 | 29 |
| 10 | Nottingham Forest | 30 | 10 | 8 | 12 | 48 | 52 | 0.923 | 28 |

Source: World Football
Rules for classification: 1) Points; 2) Goal average; 3) Goals scored

== Results ==
West Bromwich Albion's score comes first

=== Legend ===
| Win | Draw | Loss |

=== Football League ===
| Match | Date | Opponent | Venue | Result | Attendance | Scorers |
|---|---|---|---|---|---|---|
| 1 | 10 September 1892 | Bolton Wanderers | A | 1–3 | 4,100 | Geddes |
| 2 | 17 September 1892 | Wolverhampton Wanderers | H | 2–1 | 4,000 | Bassett, Bastock |
| 3 | 19 September 1892 | Aston Villa | H | 3–2 | 11,239 | McLeod, Pearson (2) |
| 4 | 24 September 1892 | Derby County | A | 1–1 | 7,000 | Pearson |
| 5 | 1 October 1892 | Newton Heath | H | 0–0 | 4,000 | |
| 6 | 8 October 1892 | Newton Heath | A | 4–2 | 4,600 | McLeod, Bassett, Bastock (2) |
| 7 | 15 October 1892 | Everton | H | 3–0 | 4,800 | Wood, Pearson (2) |
| 8 | 22 October 1892 | Sunderland | A | 1–8 | 8,000 | Bassett |
| 9 | 29 October 1892 | Notts County | H | 4–2 | 3,000 | Geddes, Pearson, Bassett, Bastock |
| 10 | 5 November 1892 | Aston Villa | A | 2–5 | 12,100 | Geddes (2) |
| 11 | 7 November 1892 | Bolton Wanderers | H | 1–0 | 4,000 | Geddes |
| 12 | 12 November 1892 | Accrington | H | 4–0 | 4,000 | Groves (2), McLeod, Bastock |
| 13 | 19 November 1892 | Notts County | A | 1–8 | 8,000 | McLeod |
| 14 | 26 November 1892 | Stoke | H | 1–2 | 607 | Pearson |
| 15 | 10 December 1892 | Preston North End | H | 0–1 | 4,000 | |
| 16 | 17 December 1892 | Accrington | A | 4–5 | 3,000 | McLeod, Pearson, Bastock (2) |
| 17 | 24 December 1892 | Sunderland | H | 1–3 | 8,000 | Bassett |
| 18 | 26 December 1892 | Blackburn Rovers | H | 1–2 | 7,000 | Pearson |
| 19 | 27 December 1892 | Wolverhampton Wanderers | A | 1–1 | 8,000 | McLeod |
| 20 | 31 December 1892 | Burnley | A | 0–5 | 3,500 | |
| 21 | 2 January 1893 | Sheffield Wednesday | A | 0–6 | 15,000 | |
| 22 | 7 January 1893 | Burnley | H | 7–1 | 1,000 | McLeod (3), Bassett (2), Pearson, Geddes |
| 23 | 14 January 1893 | Everton | A | 0–1 | 10,000 | |
| 24 | 28 January 1893 | Blackburn Rovers | A | 1–2 | 2,300 | Geddes |
| 25 | 11 February 1893 | Stoke | A | 2–1 | 6,000 | Bassett (2) |
| 26 | 2 March 1893 | Nottingham Forest | A | 4–3 | 4,100 | Geddes, Bassett (2), Groves |
| 27 | 18 March 1893 | Sheffield Wednesday | H | 3–0 | 5,000 | McLeod, Pearson, Boyd |
| 28 | 1 April 1893 | Derby County | H | 3–1 | 3,655 | C. Perry (2), Geddes |
| 29 | 3 April 1893 | Nottingham Forest | H | 2–2 | 5,000 | C. Perry, Reynolds |
| 30 | 13 April 1893 | Preston North End | A | 1–1 | 8,200 | C. Perry |

=== FA Cup ===
| Round | Date | Opponent | Venue | Result | Attendance | Scorers |
|---|---|---|---|---|---|---|
| R1 | 21 January 1893 | Everton | A | 1–4 | 23,867 | Pearson |

== See also ==
- 1892–93 in English football
- List of West Bromwich Albion F.C. seasons
