= 1890–91 West Bromwich Albion F.C. season =

West Bromwich Albion
1890–91 season
- Chairman: Edward W. Heelis/Henry Jackson
- Manager: Louis Ford
- Stadium: Stoney Lane
- Football League: 12th
- FA Cup: Semi-final
- Top goalscorer: League: Tom Pearson (13); All: Tom Pearson (15)
Home colours

The 1890–91 season was the 13th season in the history of West Bromwich Albion and their third season in the Football League. Albion finished the season in 12th position.

== Final League table ==
Pos	Team	Pld	W	D	L	GF	GA	GAv	Pts	Qualification
8	Burnley	22	9	3	10	52	63	0.825	21	
9	Aston Villa	22	7	4	11	45	58	0.776	18	Re-elected
10	Accrington	22	6	4	12	28	50	0.560	16	Re-elected
11	Derby County	22	7	1	14	47	81	0.580	15	Re-elected
12	West Bromwich Albion	22	5	2	15	34	57	0.596	12	Re-elected

== Results ==
West Bromwich Albion's score comes first

=== Legend ===
Win	Draw	Loss

=== Football League ===
Match	Date	Opponent	Venue	Result	Attendance	Scorers
1	6 September 1890	Everton	H	1–4	5,600	Pearson
2	13 September 1890	Preston North End	A	0–3	8,500	
3	20 September 1890	Sunderland	H	0–4	8,537	
4	27 September 1890	Aston Villa	A	4–0	12,000	Dyer, Bayliss, Pearson, Burns
5	4 October 1890	Burnley	H	3–1	6,000	Pearson, Burns (2)
6	11 October 1890	Notts County	A	2–3	4,900	T. Perry, Woodhall
7	18 October 1890	Notts County	H	1–1	7,367	Pearson
8	25 October 1890	Everton	A	3–2	9,200	Dyer, Nicholls, Burns
9	1 November 1890	Aston Villa	H	0–3	8,000	
10	3 November 1890	Bolton Wanderers	H	2–4	1,506	Pearson (2)
11	8 November 1890	Sunderland	A	1–1	3,400	Woodhall
12	22 November 1890	Derby County	A	1–3	4,000	Pearson
13	29 November 1890	Derby County	H	3–4	405	Bayliss, Pearson, Nicholls
14	6 December 1890	Burnley	A	4–5	5,500	C. Perry, Riley, Pearson (2)
15	13 December 1890	Wolverhampton Wanderers	H	0–1	3,400	
16	20 December 1890	Blackburn Rovers	A	1–2	5,500	Pearson
17	3 January 1891	Wolverhampton Wanderers	A	0–4	9,300	
18	7 February 1891	Preston North End	H	1–3	4,300	Burns
19	7 March 1891	Accrington	H	5–1	800	Nicholls (2), Pearson (2), Groves
20	9 March 1891	Blackburn Rovers	H	1–0	2,700	McLeod
21	14 March 1891	Bolton Wanderers	A	1–7	5,200	Gardiner (o.g.)
22	18 April 1891	Accrington	A	0–1	3,300	

=== FA Cup ===
Round	Date	Opponent	Venue	Result	Attendance	Scorers
R2	31 January 1891	Birmingham St George's	A	3–0	7,000	Nicholls, Dyer, C. Perry
R3	14 February 1891	Sheffield Wednesday	A	2–0	16,871	Groves, Pearson
SF	28 February 1891	Blackburn Rovers	N	2–3	21,774	Groves, Pearson

== See also ==
- 1890–91 in English football
- List of West Bromwich Albion F.C. seasons
