= Jack Horton (footballer, born 1866) =

English footballer (1866–1946)

Personal information
- Full name: John Henry Horton
- Date of birth: 15 February 1866
- Place of birth: West Bromwich, England
- Date of death: 28 December 1946 (aged 80)
- Place of death: West Bromwich, England
- Positions: Defender; forward

Youth career
- Oak Villa

Senior career*
Years	Team	Apps	(Gls)
1881–1882	Wednesbury Old Athletic		
1882–1897	West Bromwich Albion	130	(0)
- * Club domestic league appearances and goals

John Henry Horton (15 February 1866 – 28 December 1946) was an English footballer who played in the English Football League and the 1895 FA Cup final for West Bromwich Albion. He also played for Burslem Port Vale and Wednesbury Old Athletic. His brother Ezra was also a footballer and a teammate for many years at West Brom.

== Career ==
Horton, a player able to play either as a defender or as an attacker, began his career at Oak Villa. He represented Wednesbury Old Athletic, before joining up with West Bromwich Albion. Whilst with West Brom he also played at least four friendly matches for Burslem Port Vale, scoring three goals, between April 1884 and December 1885. All three of his goals came in a 6–1 win over Wednesbury Town on 5 April 1884.

He made his league debut on 8 September 1888 as a full-back for West Bromwich Albion in a 2–0 win against Stoke at the Victoria Ground. He played 19 of the "Throstles" 22 Football League matches and was part of a defence line that achieved three clean sheets whilst restricting the opposition to a single goal on four occasions. He played 129 league games in the English Football League from 1889 to 1897, including 19 of the club's 22 games in the league's inaugural season. The club's best finish in his time there was fifth place in 1889–90. He appeared in the 1895 FA Cup final at Crystal Palace and unsuccessfully battled with Aston Villa's Jack Devey in a goalmouth scramble just some 30 seconds into the game; despite this, the goal was credited to Bob Chatt. It proved to be the only goal of the game.

== Style of play ==
Horton was described in one source as a grand full-back who could never be faulted when it came to resolute tackling and clearing his line, which he did in fine style.

== Career statistics ==
Appearances and goals by club, season and competition
Club	Season	League			FA Cup		Other		Total	
Club	Season	Division	Apps	Goals	Apps	Goals	Apps	Goals	Apps	Goals
West Bromwich Albion	1888–89	Football League	19	0	1	0	0	0	20	0
West Bromwich Albion	1889–90	Football League	17	0	2	0	0	0	19	0
West Bromwich Albion	1890–91	Football League	15	0	1	0	0	0	16	0
West Bromwich Albion	1891–92	Football League	6	0	0	0	0	0	6	0
West Bromwich Albion	1892–93	First Division	19	0	1	0	0	0	20	0
West Bromwich Albion	1893–94	First Division	7	0	0	0	0	0	7	0
West Bromwich Albion	1894–95	First Division	17	0	1	0	0	0	18	0
West Bromwich Albion	1895–96	First Division	25	0	4	0	4	0	34	0
West Bromwich Albion	1896–97	First Division	4	0	1	0	0	0	5	0
West Bromwich Albion	1897–98	First Division	1	0	0	0	0	0	1	0
West Bromwich Albion	Total		130	0	11	0	4	0	145	0

== Honours ==
West Bromwich Albion

- FA Cup runner-up: 1895
