= West Bromwich Charity Cup =

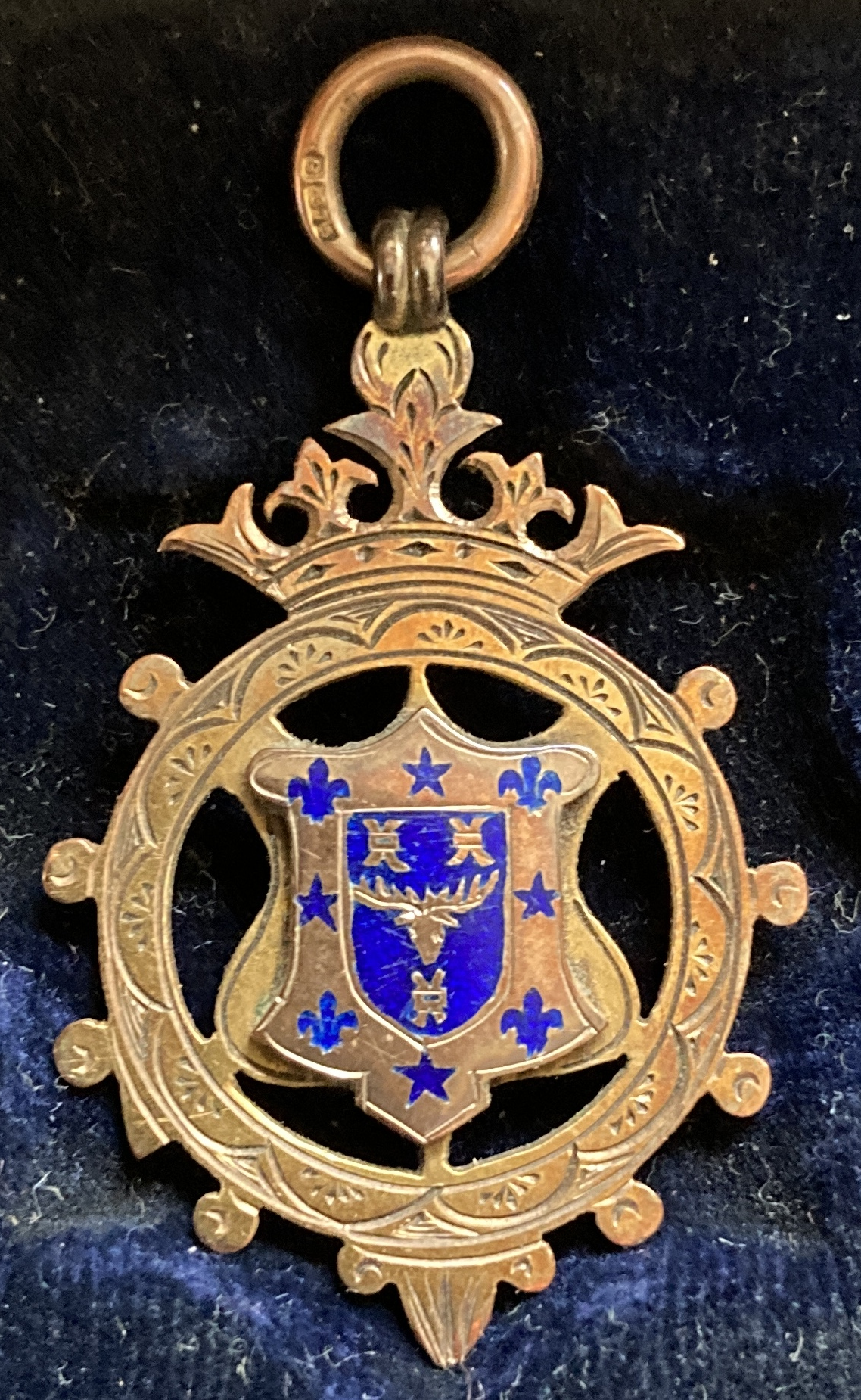
- West Bromwich Charity Cup medal (obverse), awarded to Edmund Wood in the 1901-02 season. The decoration is based on the coat of arms of West Bromwich
- Founded: 1888
- Region: West Midlands
- Most championships: West Bromwich Albion (6 titles)

The West Bromwich Friendly Societies Charity Cup, better known as the West Bromwich Charity Cup, was a football competition for teams from the West Midlands region, though at least one team from outside the area (Everton) also participated.

In 2014 three medals awarded to West Bromwich Albion reserve player Stan Amos, including his 1924 West Bromwich FSCC winner's 9-carrat gold medal, were sold at auction.

== Winners ==
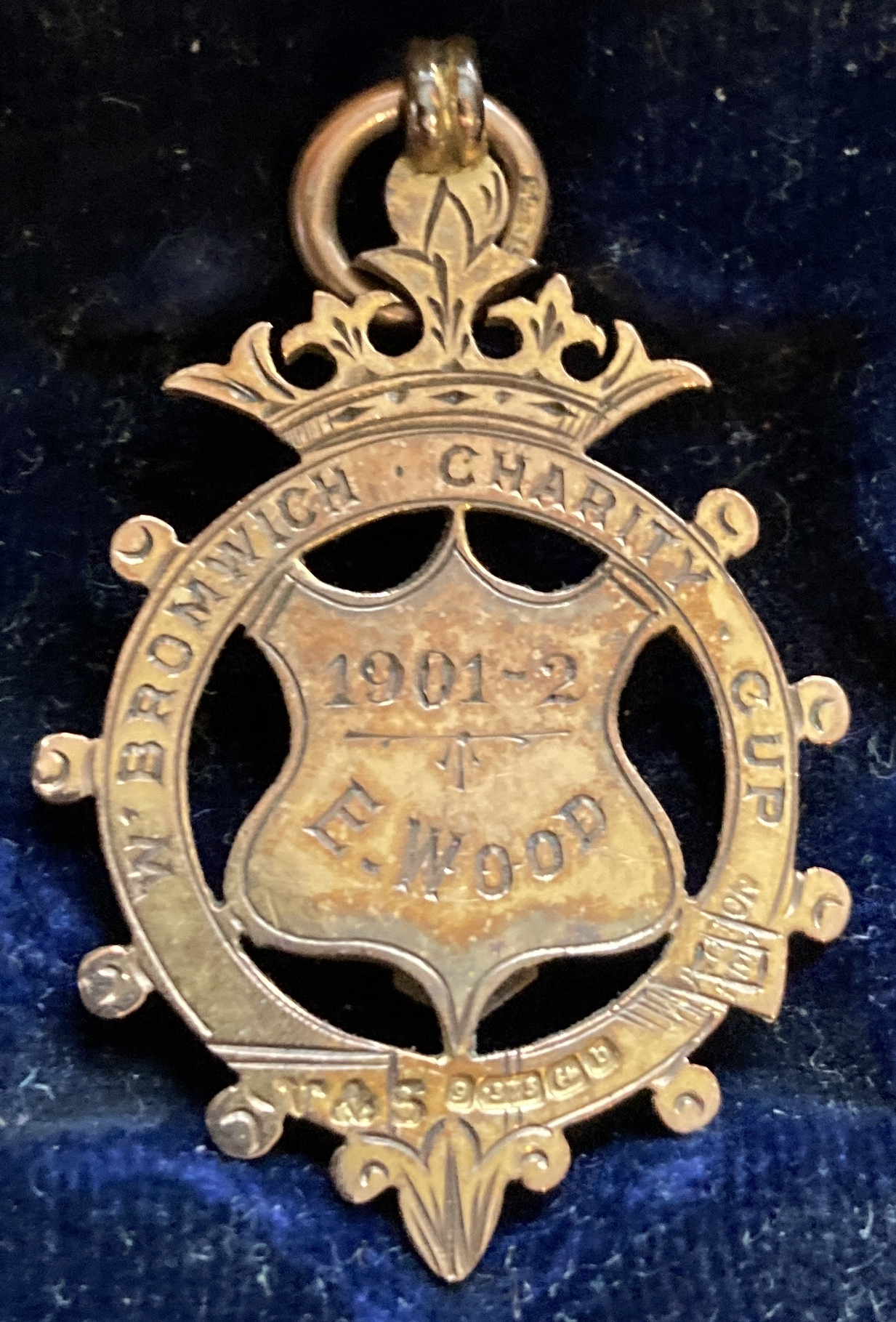
West Bromwich Charity Cup medal (reverse), awarded to Edmund Wood in the 1901-02 season. The "V&S" maker's mark is for P. Vaughton and Sons. The hallmark denotes 9 carat gold (".375"), Birmingham Assay Office (the anchor), and the year 1901 (letter "b").

Date	Achiever	Score	Runners–up	Venue	Attendance	Refs
21 May 1888	West Bromwich Albion	10–1	Great Bridge Unity	Stoney Lane	6,500	
1 June 1889	West Bromwich Albion	2–0	Wolverhampton Wanderers	Stoney Lane	3,000	
17 May 1890	West Bromwich Albion	1–1 (Note: The trophy was shared.)	Aston Villa	Stoney Lane	4,000	
30 May 1891	West Bromwich Albion	3–2	Wednesbury Old Athletic	Stoney Lane	5,000	
21 November 1892	Everton	2–0	West Bromwich Albion	Stoney Lane	3,500	
15 October 1894	West Bromwich Albion	1–0	Everton	Stoney Lane	5,000	
13 January 1896	Everton	2–1	West Bromwich Albion	Stoney Lane	3,500	
15 February 1897	West Bromwich Albion	2–1	Everton	Stoney Lane	3,000	
29 November 1897	Everton	1–1	West Bromwich Albion	Stoney Lane	5,000	
(R) 18 April 1898	Everton	4–0	West Bromwich Albion	Goodison Park	12,000	
