= Charlie Shaw (footballer, born 1862) =

English footballer

Personal information
- Full name: Charles Richard Shaw
- Date of birth: 18 November 1862
- Place of birth: Willenhall, England
- Date of death: February 1931 (aged 68)
- Position: Forward

Senior career*
Years	Team	Apps	(Gls)
- Willenhall Pickwick
- Wolverhampton Wanderers
????–1888	Walsall Swifts		
1888	West Bromwich Albion	1	(1)
1888–1893	Walsall		
1894–1895	Wednesfield Star		
- * Club domestic league appearances and goals

Charles Richard Shaw (18 November 1862 – February 1931) was an English footballer who played in the Football League for West Bromwich Albion.

Charlie Shaw was born in Willenhall, a suburb of Walsall, Staffordshire. He played school football for Essington & Willenhall Schools. He then played football for Willenhall Pickwick moving onto Wolverhampton Wanderers. Sometime before 1888 Shaw left Wolverhampton Wanderers and signed for Walsall Swifts for his first spell there leaving in August 1888.

Charlie Shaw signed for West Bromwich Albion, as an amateur, in August 1888. Shaw, playing as a winger, made his West Bromwich Albion and League debut on 29 September 1888 at Stoney Lane, the then home of West Bromwich Albion. The visitors were Burnley who were defeated by the home team 4–3. In the same match Charlie Shaw scored his club, League debut goal and only League goal of his career. When the score was 3–3 Shaw scored what proved to be the winning goal in controversial circumstances. In the last minute the referee, Mr Jope, agreed with Albion's claims that a shot from Charlie Shaw, in his only League game for the Baggies, had gone under the bar before being fisted away by Robert Kay, a decision 'hotly contested by the visitors'. Albion had won 4–3, but both sides had provided great entertainment for the crowd.

An eager–beaver left–winger, Charlie Shaw came to Albion on a month's trial, playing just one senior game and scoring a goal against Burnley (home) in Division One in September 1888, (won 4–3). He spent most of his career playing for the Swifts (Walsall) and represented the Staffordshire FA XI and the Birmingham FA XI in 1888–89. Shaw rejoined Walsall Town Swifts in October 1888 and he remained there until 1893. His final club was Wednesfield Star from 1894 to 1895. He became a licensee in Wolverhampton. He died in February 1931 aged 68.
