= George Haynes =

George Haynes may refer to:

- George Haynes (businessman) (1745–1830), British entrepreneur, pottery manufacturer, banker and newspaper proprietor
- George Edmund Haynes (1881–1959), co-founder and first executive director of the National Urban League
- George Haynes (footballer) (1865–1937), English footballer
- Tiger Haynes (1914–1994), American actor and jazz musician
