= Bastock =

Bastock is an English surname. Notable people with the surname include:

- Paul Bastock (born 1970), English footballer
- Archie Bastock (1869–1964), Welsh footballer
- Margaret Bastock (1920–1984), English zoologist and geneticist

== See also ==
- Bostock (surname)
