= Walter Perry (footballer) =

English footballer

Personal information
- Full name: Walter Perry
- Date of birth: 11 October 1868
- Place of birth: West Bromwich, England
- Date of death: 21 September 1928 (aged 59)
- Position: Forward

Senior career*
Years	Team	Apps	(Gls)
1885–1886	West Bromwich Excelsior		
1886–1889	West Bromwich Albion	9	(4)
1889–1890	Wolverhampton Wanderers	8	(3)
1890–1891	Warwick County		
1891–1894	Burton Swifts	40	(7)
1894–1895	West Bromwich Albion	1	(0)
1895–1900	Burton Swifts	?	(?)
- * Club domestic league appearances and goals

Walter Perry (11 October 1868 – 21 September 1928) was an English footballer who played in The Football League for Burton Swifts, West Bromwich Albion and Wolverhampton Wanderers.

A naturally gifted, versatile footballer, Walter Perry, who could occupy both wing–half and inside–forward positions, had two spells with West Bromwich Albion as a player but never really established himself as a regular in the first team. His first club was West Bromwich Excelsior for which he signed in 1885. He then signed for West Bromwich Albion in August 1886. There is no record of his 'Albion' debut.

Walter Perry, playing as an inside–forward, made his League debut on 29 September 1888 at Stoney Lane, the then home of West Bromwich Albion. The visitors were Burnley and the home team defeated the visitors 4–3. Walter Perry also scored his debut League goal in this match. Walter Perry scored with a header in the 40th minute to open the scoring for 'Albion' who, at that point were trailing 2–0. Perry appeared in nine of the 22 League matches played by West Bromwich Albion in season 1888–89 and scored four League goals. Perry appeared as an inside–forward/centre–forward (eight at inside + one at centre) in a 'Albion' forward line that scored three–League–goals–or–more–in–a–match on four separate occasions. Perry also played in four FA Cup ties in season 1888–89, including the semi–final, lost 1–0 to Preston North End, and scored five goals, including a hat–trick against Burnley.

Perry left for Wolverhampton Wanderers in December 1889 having got no first–team action at 'Albion'. He appeared in eight League matches for the 'Wolves' and scored three League goals. In May 1890 he left for non–League Warwick County. By August 1891 he was back in the Football League, but a Second Division club Burton Swifts. By the time he returned to 'Albion' in October 1894, he had appeared 47 times for Burton Swifts (40 League and seven FA Cup) and scored 12 goals (seven League and five FA Cup). He made one more top–flight appearance for 'Albion' (he played more than 40 times for 'Albion") and then returned to Burton Swifts in November 1895 finally retiring as a player in May 1900. He returned to 'Albion' in 1906 as reserve team manager, leaving in 1907 and was a Football League linesman from 1909 to 1912. He was taken ill shortly after World War 1 ended and never fully recovered his health, dying on 21 September 1928.
