= Albert Aldridge =

English footballer

Personal information
- Full name: Albert James Aldridge
- Date of birth: 4 August 1863
- Place of birth: Walsall, England
- Date of death: 22 June 1891 (aged 27)
- Place of death: Walsall, England
- Position: Full back

Youth career
- 1881–1885: Walsall Swifts

Senior career*
Years	Team	Apps	(Gls)
1885–1886	Walsall Swifts		
1886–1888	West Bromwich Albion		
1888–1889	Walsall Town Swifts		
1889–1891	Aston Villa	17	(0)

International career
1888–1889	England	2	(0)
- * Club domestic league appearances and goals

Albert James Aldridge (4 August 1863 – 22 June 1891) was an English footballer who played as a full back. He was born in Walsall, won the FA Cup in 1888 and played twice for the England national team.

== Career ==
=== Walsall Swifts ===
Aldridge started his career as a youth player at hometown club Walsall Swifts, where he spent six seasons (five as a youth player and one as a senior player). He played in nine FA Cup ties and scored one goal, in a third round win over Mitchell St George's in January 1885.

=== West Bromwich Albion ===
In March 1886 Aldridge moved to West Bromwich Albion where he earned his first cap for England in a British Home Championship match against Ireland in Belfast. He had great success in the FA Cup while at West Bromwich Albion, helping them reach the final in 1887, and to win the trophy in 1888 by beating the much-fancied Preston North End in the final.

=== Walsall Town Swifts ===
Despite his cup heroics, Aldridge moved back to the newly merged Walsall Town Swifts during that summer. He played in 13 matches in the Midland Association for the "Saddlers" in 1888–89 and earned his second, and final, England cap in a match against Ireland in the British Home Championship at Anfield. Aldridge was the second player to play for England while at Walsall, after Alf Jones who appeared for the national side while playing for Walsall Swifts in 1882.

=== Aston Villa ===
In August 1889 Aldridge joined Aston Villa, where he made 17 appearances in the Football League as Villa finished eighth. His club and League debut was on 7 September 1889 at Wellington Road, Perry Barr, when Burnley were the visitors. The Cricket and Football Field of 7 September reported on the match. It was 1–1 at half-time and 2–2 at full-time. Aldridge played at left-back. Aldridge got a couple of mentions as he did some good defensive work. His last match was on 28 December 1889 when Villa travelled to the County Ground, Derby. Aldridge played in a less familiar position, right-back. Aston Villa lost 5–0. The "poor health" referred to in Matthews' book meant he missed the rest of the season. Villa kept Aldridge on the books until April 1891, a few months before he died.

== Death ==
Aldridge died on 22 June 1891 at his home in Walsall, due to poor health. He was only 27 years old.

== Honours ==
West Bromwich Albion

- FA Cup winner: 1888
- FA Cup runner-up: 1887
