= 1887 FA Cup final =

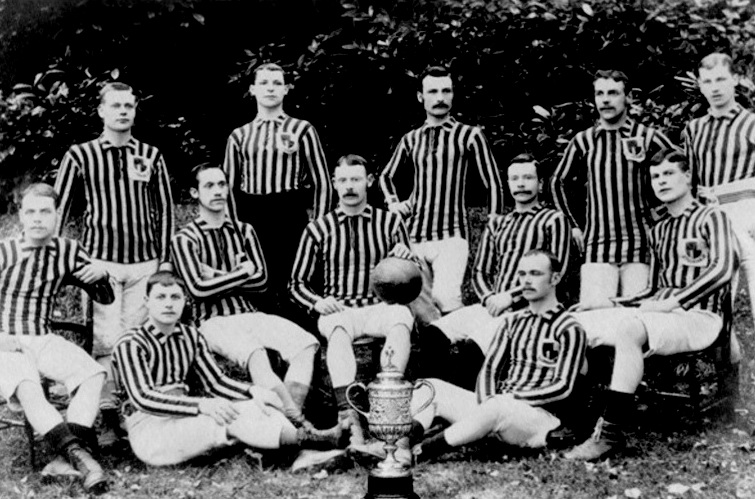
- Aston Villa, winning side
- Event: 1886–87 FA Cup
Aston Villa	West Bromwich Albion
2	0
- Date: 4 April 1887
- Venue: Kennington Oval, London
- Referee: Francis Marindin
- Attendance: 15,500

The 1887 FA Cup final was a football match between Aston Villa and West Bromwich Albion at the Kennington Oval. It was the final of the sixteenth staging of the FA Cup which saw 124 teams compete for the final. The final was won by Aston Villa with goals coming from Archie Hunter and Dennis Hodgetts to give Aston Villa a 2–0 victory. This is Aston Villa’s first of 7 FA cups.

== Route to the Final ==
Aston Villa's route to the final was a turbulent one, smashing Wednesbury Old Athletic 13–0 in the first round, but having to play three replays against Wolverhampton Wanderers. After that, they recovered to make it to the final.

Although West Bromwich Albion had no wins nearly as large as Aston Villa's, their path to the final was less turbulent, constantly defeating teams without much variation.

Aston Villa

Round	Opponent	Score	Rep.1	Rep.2	Rep.3
1	Wednesbury Old Athletic	13–0			
2	Derby Midland	6–1			
3	Wolverhampton Wanderers	2–2	1–1	3–3	2–0
4	bye				
5	Horncastle	5–0			
6	Darwen	3–2			
Semi-Finals	Rangers	3–1			

West Bromwich Albion

Round	Opponent	Score	Rep.1
1	Burton Wanderers	6–0	
2	Derby Junction	2–1	
3	bye		
4	Mitchell St. George's	1–0	
5	Lockwood Brothers	1–0 (Note: Match voided)	2–1
6	Notts County	4–1	
Semi-Finals	Preston North End	3–1	

== Background ==
Aston Villa and West Bromwich Albion had already played each other in the FA Cup once, in 1885. They played out a goalless draw, with West Bromwich winning the replay 3–0. Although the two clubs have a fierce rivalry, this match was well before the rivalry developed and was probably not even a catalyst for the rivalry.

== Match ==
=== Summary ===
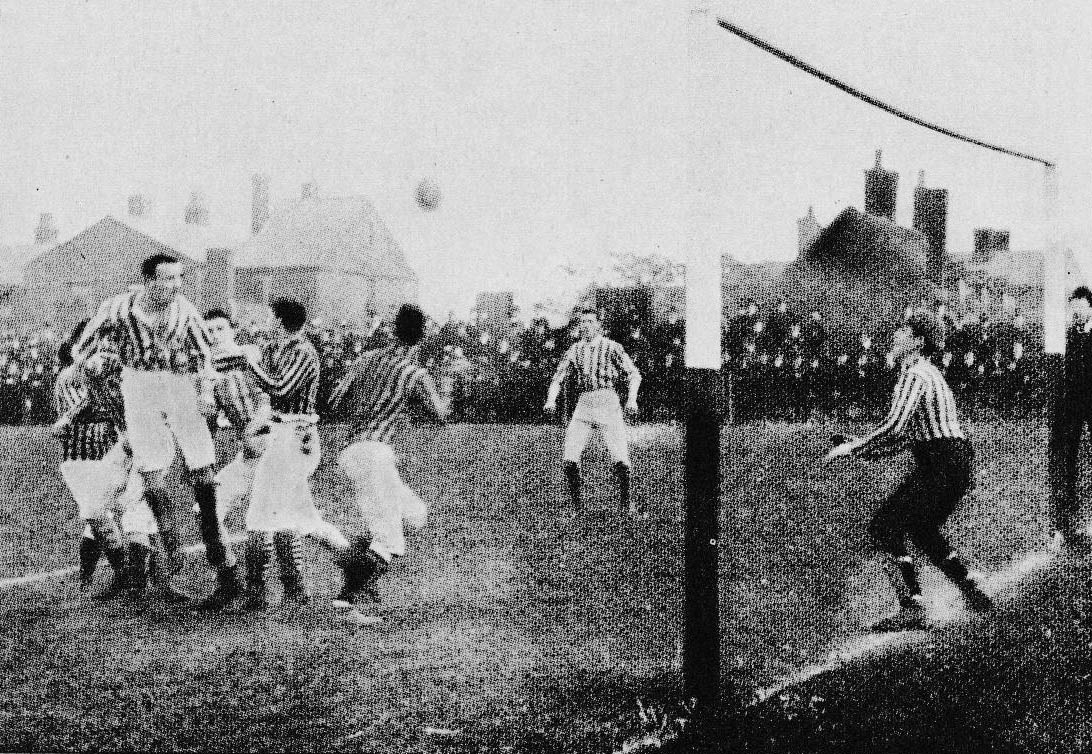
A scene of the match

After defeating the incredibly strong team Preston North End in the semis, West Bromwich began the match as favourites. For forty-five minutes, the Aston Villa defense was besieged. The Albion strikers even attempted to run the goalie over his own goal line. However, the first half ended goalless. In the second half, momentum began to shift Villa's way, as West Brom lost confidence. Finally, Villa broke the deadlock when Archie Hunter fired home, the West Brom goalie not even attempting a save, believing Hunter to be offside. In the final minute, Villa completed the win, with Dennis Hodgetts colliding with West Bromwich Albion goalie Bob Roberts, and poking the ball over the line to make it 2–0

=== Details ===
1886–87 FA Cup Final
2 April 1887

Aston Villa	2–0	West Bromwich Albion
Hunter; Hodgetts

Kennington Oval, London
Attendance: 15,500
Referee: Francis Marindin

Aston Villa	West Bromwich Albion

GK	Jimmy Warner
DF	Frank Coulton
DF	Joseph Simmonds
MF	John Burton
MF	Harry Yates
MF	Frankie Dawson
FW	Richmond Davis
FW	Albert Brown
FW	Archie Hunter (c)
FW	Howard Vaughton
FW	Dennis Hodgetts

GK	Bob Roberts
DF	Harry Green
DF	Albert Aldridge
MF	Ezra Horton
MF	Charlie Perry
MF	George Timmins
FW	George Woodhall
FW	Tommy Green
FW	Jem Bayliss (c)
FW	Bill Paddock
FW	Tom Pearson

== See also ==
- Aston Villa F.C.–West Bromwich Albion F.C. rivalry
