= Robert Kay (footballer) =

English footballer

Personal information
- Place of birth: England
- Position: Goalkeeper

Senior career*
Years	Team	Apps	(Gls)
1884–1889	Burnley	5	(0)
1889	Burnley Union Star		
- * Club domestic league appearances and goals

Robert Kay was an English professional footballer who played as a goalkeeper. He played five games for Burnley in the first-ever season of the Football League.

Robert Kay signed for Burnley in 1884, just two years after the club was formed. Kay, playing in goal, made his League debut on 29 September 1888 at Stoney Lane, the then home of West Bromwich Albion. Burnley lost to the home team 4–3. Robert Kay appeared in five of the 22 League matches played by Burnley in season 1888–89. Kay, as a goalkeeper (five appearances), was part of a Burnley defence that restricted the opposition to one–League–goal–in–a–match once.

In 1889 he left Burnley to play for Burnley Union Star one season before the club joined the Lancashire League.
