= George Cave (footballer) =

English footballer

Personal information
- Full name: George Harry Cave
- Date of birth: 1874
- Place of birth: Great Bridge, West Midlands, England
- Date of death: 1904 (aged 29–30)
- Position: Full back

Senior career*
Years	Team	Apps	(Gls)
1893–1894	Horseley Heath		
1894–1895	Great Bridge Unity		
1895–1901	West Bromwich Albion	77	(0)
Total		77	(0)
- * Club domestic league appearances and goals

George Harry Cave (1874–1904) was an English footballer who played in the Football League for West Bromwich Albion. He suffered from tuberculosis in the last year of his life.
