= Alexander Ramsey (footballer) =

English footballer (1867–1942)

Personal information
- Date of birth: 1867
- Place of birth: Collington, England
- Date of death: 1942 (aged 74–75)
- Position: Defender

Senior career*
| Years | Team | Apps | (Gls) |
- Kidderminster Harriers
| 1888–1889 | West Bromwich Albion | 1 | (0) |
| – | Kidderminster Harriers | | |
- * Club domestic league appearances and goals

Alexander Ramsey (1867–1942) was an English footballer who played as a defender in The Football League for West Bromwich Albion.
