= Harold Oliver (footballer, born 1863) =

English footballer

Personal information
- Date of birth: 1863
- Place of birth: Birmingham, England
- Position: Defender

Senior career*
| Years | Team | Apps | (Gls) |
| 1888–1889 | West Bromwich Albion | 1 | (0) |
- * Club domestic league appearances and goals

Harold Oliver (1863–?) was an English footballer who played in The Football League for West Bromwich Albion.
