= Ezra Horton =

English footballer

Personal information
- Date of birth: 20 August 1861
- Place of birth: West Bromwich, England
- Date of death: 10 July 1939 (aged 77)
- Place of death: West Bromwich, England
- Position: Right-half

Youth career
- 1880: George Salter's Works
- 1880–1885: West Bromwich Albion (amateur)
- 1884: → Port Vale (guest)
- 1885: → Aston Villa (guest)

Senior career*
Years	Team	Apps	(Gls)
1885–1891	West Bromwich Albion	46	(0)
- * Club domestic league appearances and goals

Ezra Horton (20 August 1861 – 10 July 1939) was an English footballer who played at right-half; he had the nickname "Ironsides". He played for West Bromwich Albion in the FA Cup final in 1886, 1887 and 1888. His younger brother Jack was also a footballer.

== Career ==
Ezra Horton was born in West Bromwich, Staffordshire on 20 August 1861. He attended the Christ Church & Beeches Road Schools and signed for George Salter Works in 1880 before moving on to West Bromwich Albion in the same year. As a footballer, Horton was a very sporting player, a largely defensive right—half who was good at heading, strong with his kicking and fearsome in the tackle, hence his nickname of "Ironsides".

He played his first game for the West Bromwich Albion at St. George's in September 1882. After making guest appearances for Port Vale in September 1884 and Aston Villa in March and April 1885, he turned professional with Albion in August 1885. Ezra Horton was most notable for his exploits in the FA Cup. Horton had the distinction of playing in each of the club's first 36 FA Cup ties, including Albion's first-ever FA Cup tie, his senior debut against Wednesbury Town in November 1883. He picked up two runners-up medals and one winners medal. In the 1886 final, he was unable to prevent a 2–0 defeat to Blackburn Rovers in a replay at the Racecourse Ground in Derby. He was again on the losing side in the 1887 final, as Aston Villa claimed a 2–0 victory at The Oval. It proved to be third time lucky for Horton, as he helped the "Throstles" to a 2–1 victory over Preston North End at The Oval in the 1888 final.

Horton, playing as a wing-half, made his League debut on 22 September 1888 at Leamington Road, the then home of Blackburn Rovers. West Bromwich Albion were defeated by the home team 6–2. Ezra Horton appeared in eight of the 22 League matches played by West Bromwich Albion during the 1888–89 season. Ezra also played in the FA Cup semi-final against Preston North End on 16 March 1889, Albion losing 1–0.

In all, he appeared in more than 350 matches for West Bromwich Albion across all competitions – including local cup—ties and friendlies – during his nine-year association with the club. He retired from playing football in June 1891, and in 1895 he became a referee and also a hockey international. Note: Ezra's brother, John Horton, was also a member of Albion's first XI, and they played together on many occasions.

== Career statistics ==
Appearances and goals by club, season and competition
Club	Season	League			FA Cup		Other		Total	
Club	Season	Division	Apps	Goals	Apps	Goals	Apps	Goals	Apps	Goals
West Bromwich Albion	1888–89	The Football League	8	0	4	0	0	0	12	0
West Bromwich Albion	1889–90	The Football League	22	0	2	0	0	0	24	0
West Bromwich Albion	1890–91	The Football League	16	0	0	0	0	0	16	0

== Honours ==
West Bromwich Albion

- FA Cup: 1888; runner-up: 1886 & 1887
