= Harry Jones (footballer, born 1911) =

English footballer

Personal information
- Full name: Harry Joseph Jones
- Date of birth: 26 October 1911
- Place of birth: Haydock, England
- Date of death: 22 February 1957 (aged 45)
- Place of death: Preston, England
- Positions: Inside right; centre-forward

Senior career*
Years	Team	Apps	(Gls)
1928–1933	Preston North End		
1933–1943	West Bromwich Albion		
- * Club domestic league appearances and goals

Harry Jones (26 October 1911 – 22 February 1957) was an English footballer who played at inside-right and centre-forward. He was nicknamed Popeye.

== Biography ==
Jones was born in Haydock, Lancashire. He signed as a professional with Preston North End in July 1928 before moving on to West Bromwich Albion for £500 in 1933. Jones appeared as a guest player for Everton and Blackburn Rovers during the early part of the Second World War, before retiring due to illness and injury in 1943. He died in Preston in 1957, aged 45.
