= Charles Donnachie =

Scottish footballer

Personal information
- Full name: Charles Donnachie
- Date of birth: 1869
- Place of birth: Invergowrie, Scotland
- Date of death: 1923 (aged 53–54)
- Position: Half back

Senior career*
| Years | Team | Apps | (Gls) |
- Dundee
| 1889–1890 | West Bromwich Albion | 2 | (0) |
- Cambuslang Rangers
- * Club domestic league appearances and goals

Charles Donnachie (1869 – 1923) was a Scottish footballer who played in the Football League for West Bromwich Albion.
