= Luther Walker =

English footballer

Personal information
- Full name: Luther Walker
- Date of birth: Q2 1864
- Place of birth: West Bromwich, England
- Date of death: 1903 (aged 42–43)
- Position: Defender

Senior career*
Years	Team	Apps	(Gls)
1880–1883	West Bromwich Royal		
1883–1891	West Bromwich Albion	18	(0)
1891–1892	West Bromwich Standard		
- * Club domestic league appearances and goals

Luther Walker (Q2 1864 – Q1 1903) was an English footballer who played in The Football League for West Bromwich Albion.

Luther Walker signed for West Bromwich Royal in 1880/1882 (NOTE:ENFA and Matthews have different years). He left in the April of the following year and signed for West Bromwich Albion as an amateur and then signed as a professional in August 1885. Luther Walker was an excellent full–back, equally adept with his head and both feet and could kick a ball an astronomical distance. Sadly, injuries and ill–health curtailed his career sooner than he had anticipated. He made his senior debut for Albion against Derby Junction (away)in a second round FA Cup tie in November 1886.

Luther Walker, playing as a full–back, made his League debut on 29 September 1888 at Stoney Lane, the then home of West Bromwich Albion. The visitors were Burnley and the home team won the match 4–3. Luther Walker appeared in 12 of the 22 League matches played by West Bromwich Albion in season 1888–89. Luther Walker, playing as a full–back (12 appearances) played in a West Bromwich Albion defence that kept one clean–sheet and restricted the opposition to one–League–goal–in–a–match on three occasions.

In season 1889–90 Walker only made six appearances and did not play in the 1890–91 season at all. He left West Bromwich Albion in 1891 having played 35 first–team matches, of which 18 were League games. Walker signed for West Bromwich Standard in 1891 but he retired through injury in 1892. Luther Walker died during the first quarter of 1903 at the age 38.
