= 1878–79 West Bromwich Strollers F.C. season =

West Bromwich Strollers
1878–79 season
- Chairman: None (Note: Albion did not have a chairman until 1885.)
- Manager: None (Note: Albion did not have a secretary-manager until 1890 and did not appoint a full-time manager until 1948.)
Home colours

The 1878–79 English football season was the first season in the history of West Bromwich Albion Football Club. The club was formed in 1878 under the name West Bromwich Strollers, by workers from the George Salter's Spring Works in West Bromwich. The name "Strollers" is said to have been coined when the players were unable to purchase a football in West Bromwich and thus had to walk two miles to Wednesbury to buy one there instead.

The club's first recorded match—and their only recorded match from the 1878–79 season—took place on 23 November 1878. The game was a 12-a-side home friendly against workers from Hudson's, a local soap factory, and finished 0–0. Although the exact venue was not recorded, it is known that the club played at both Cooper's Hill and Dartmouth Park during their first few years. Evidence of the Hudson's match did not come to light until 1993; at some point after this discovery, the club altered their published date of formation from 1879 to 1878.

== See also ==
- 1878–79 in English football
