= Great Bridge Unity F.C. =

Great Bridge Unity
- Full name: Great Bridge Unity Football Club
- Nickname: the Unity
- Founded: 1879
- Dissolved: 1897
- Ground: Horseley Heath
Home colours

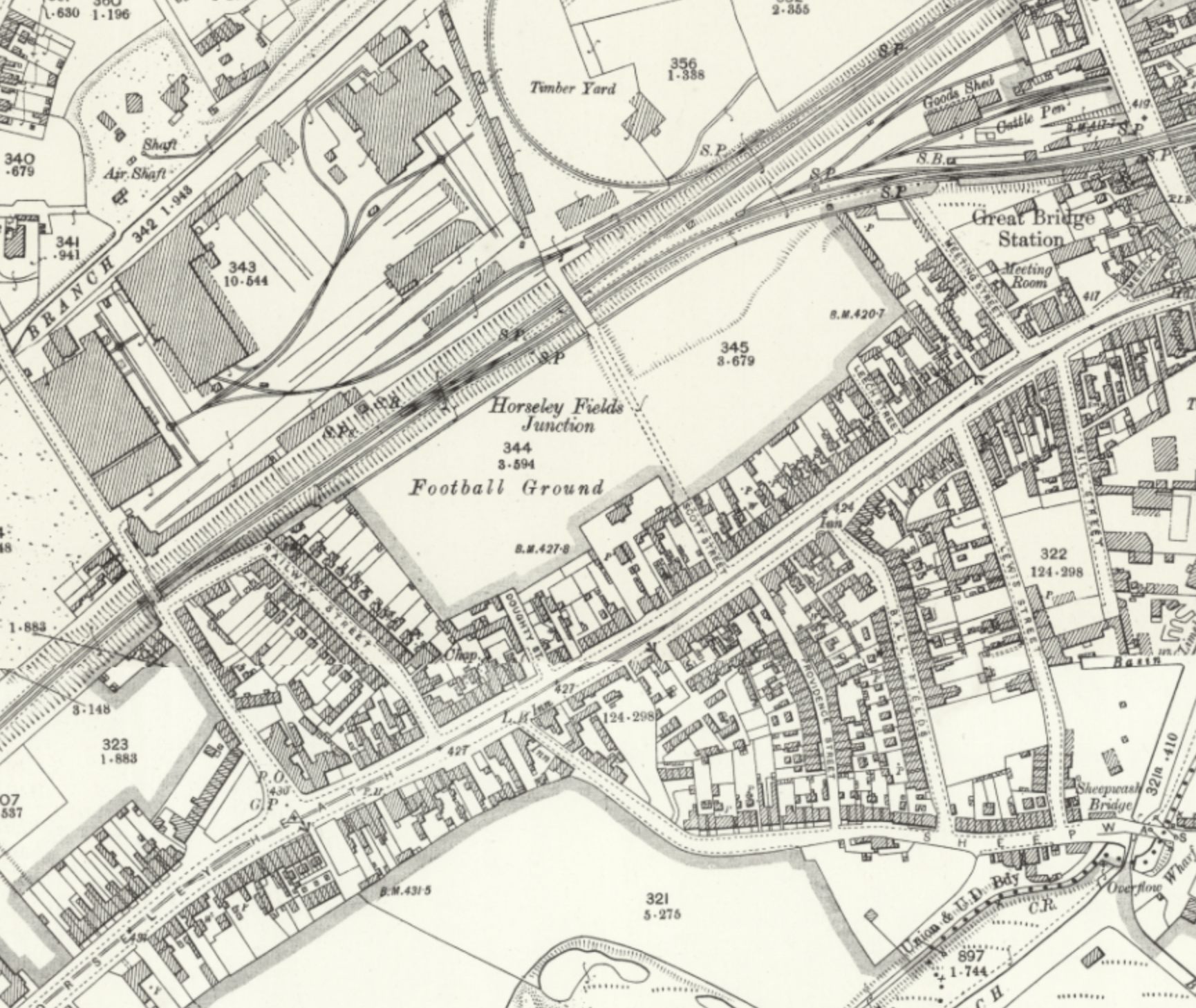
Horseley Heath Football Ground, home of Great Bridge Unity F.C., Ordnance Survey Staffordshire LXVIII.5, 1902

Great Bridge Unity F.C. was an English association football club from Great Bridge, then in Staffordshire, now in the West Midlands county.

== History ==
The Unity first entered competitive football in 1883–84, with an entry for the Birmingham Senior Cup and the Walsall Cup. In the former, the club lost to Sutton Coldfield in the first round, after two replays. In the latter, the club beat Aston Victoria in the first round, but lost to West Bromwich All Saints in the second.

The club competed in the FA Cup in the 1887–88 season. In the first round, the Unity was beaten by Stafford Road of Wolverhampton, but the Football Association ordered a replay as only seven of the Stafford Road players were eligible for the tournament. Rather than replay the tie, the Roadsters scratched, and played a friendly against the Unity on the due date (which ended 1–1).

In the second round, the Unity came from 2–1 down to beat Burton Swifts 5–2 away from home. The Unity beat Birmingham Excelsior away in the third but were finally downed by Bootle in the fourth, amid controversy; the Sporting Life judged Bootle's winner to have been offside, and the Unity made protests against the eligibility of six Bootle players. By the time the appeal had been heard, Bootle had been knocked out by the Old Carthusians, and the FA had little appetite for finding in the Unity's favour in such circumstances. The club's achievement at least earned it an invitation to the West Bromwich Charity Cup at the end of the season, and it reached the final, albeit then going down 10–1 at FA Cup winners West Bromwich Albion.

It continued to play in the qualifying rounds over the next few seasons, but never made the main stages of the competition. It was disqualified after beating Kidderminster in the third qualifying round in 1890–91, after a protest by Langley Green Victoria (whom Unity had beaten in the second round) over the eligibility of Unity's Pittaway; the protest was lodged too late to help Victoria, but it did help Kidderminster.

In 1889–90 the club was one of the founders of the Birmingham and District League; it later dropped out but resumed membership of the league for the season of 1891–92, but did not complete the season.

The final reported competitive matches for the club are in the 1895–96 season, in the West Midland League for amateur and reserve clubs, and the last matches in toto are recorded in 1897.

== Colours ==
The club originally wore red and black. In 1889 the club changed to white shirts, although it formally described its colours as black and white.

== Ground ==
The club played at Horseley Heath.

== Records ==
- FA Cup
  - Best performance: 4th Round – 1887–88
- West Bromwich Charity Cup
  - Runner-up: 1887–88
- Dudley Charity Cup
  - Winner: 1885–86

== Notable players ==
- Jack Glover, League champion with Liverpool
- Jem Bayliss, who played for the club in the early 1880s and went on to play for England
- George Cave, former West Brom player who joined Unity in 1894

== Later clubs ==
There were various attempts to start a new Great Bridge Unity club, the only one with any longevity being a 1910s incarnation which played in the very low-ranking Hill Top League in Birmingham.
