= Archie Bastock =

Welsh footballer

Personal information
- Full name: Archie Middleship Bastock
- Date of birth: 19 March 1869
- Place of birth: Hereford, Herefordshire, England
- Date of death: 13 October 1954 (aged 85)
- Place of death: Winchester, Hampshire, England

Senior career*
Years	Team	Apps	(Gls)
1891–1892	Shrewsbury Town		
1892–1893	West Bromwich Albion	26	(11)
1893–	Burton Swifts		

International career
1892	Wales	1	(0)
- * Club domestic league appearances and goals

Archie Middleship Bastock (19 March 1869 – 13 October 1954) was a Welsh footballer. He was part of the Wales national football team, playing one match on 27 February 1892 against Ireland.

During his playing career, Bastock played for Shrewsbury Town, West Bromwich Albion and Burton Swifts.

== See also ==
- List of Wales international footballers (alphabetical)
