= 1888 FA Cup final =

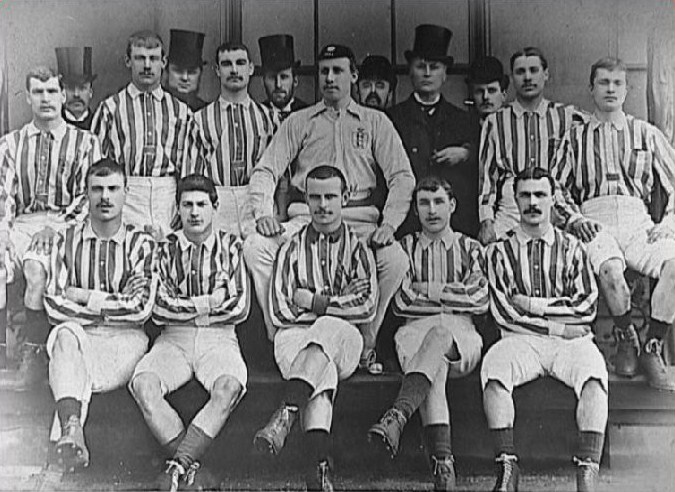
- West Bromwich Albion, winning side
- Event: 1887–88 FA Cup
West Bromwich Albion	Preston North End
2	1
- Date: 24 March 1888
- Venue: Kennington Oval, London
- Man of the Match: George Woodhall
- Referee: Francis Marindin
- Attendance: 24,452
- Weather: Overcast 20⁰C

The 1888 FA Cup final was contested by West Bromwich Albion and Preston North End at the Kennington Oval. Preston were strong favourites for the Cup, having set a record which still stands today by beating Hyde 26–0 in the first round, and were so confident of overcoming West Bromwich Albion in the final that they asked to be photographed with the trophy before the game. The FA president Major Francis Marindin turned them down and said: "Hadn't you better win it first?" They did not get their photo after the game either. So lacking in confidence were their West Bromwich opponents that when offered bets on the outcome of the game by the Preston players, they all refused, no matter how great the odds. West Brom won 2–1, with their goals scored by George Woodhall and Jem Bayliss. Fred Dewhurst scored Preston's effort.

== Overview ==
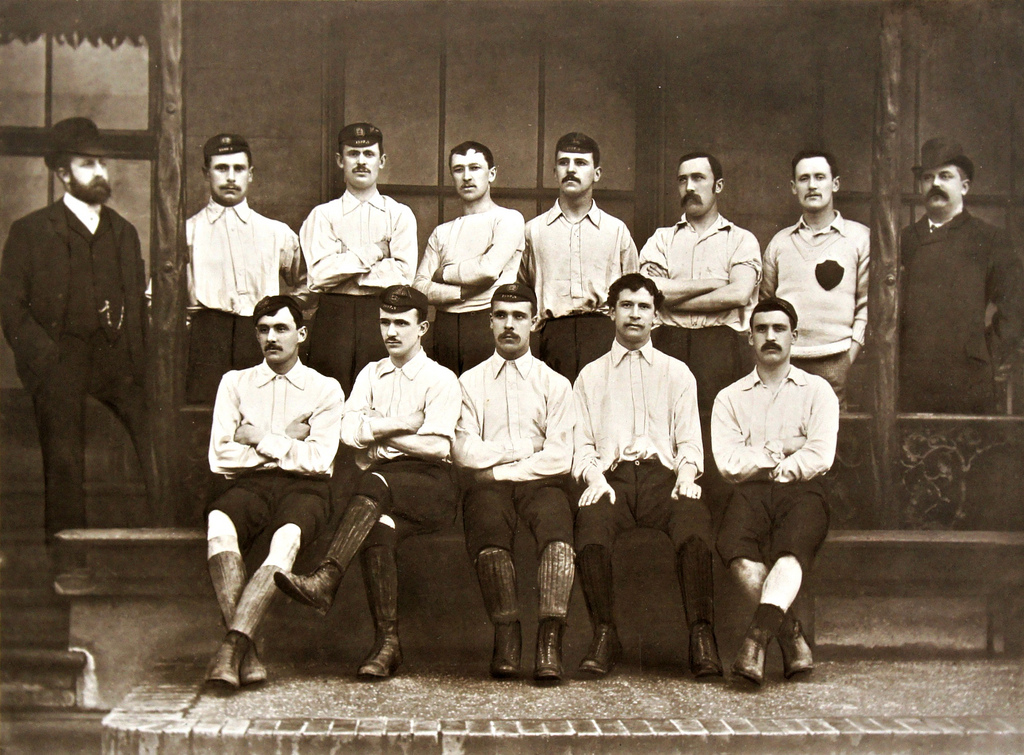
Preston North End team of 1888

John Goodall recalled many years later how, at the final whistle, he stood motionless in the centre circle for many minutes unable to comprehend the result. The refereeing of the game by Major Francis Marindin was also questioned privately by many observers who felt that he had potentially shown bias towards Albion's all-English eleven (Preston's team contained a majority of Scots). At one point during the game he stopped play just as Preston were about to score to award a free kick to Albion, despite no Albion player having made an appeal as was required by the rules of the game at that time. Cambridge University captain Tinsley Lindley later commented to defeated Preston player Jack Ross "Well Jack, you cannot expect to win when playing against eleven men and the devil." The Preston players, however, cited their own pre match routine for their defeat: Bob Holmes recalled "We got starved to death on the Thames bank {While watching the Oxford vs Cambridge boat race} and could not get warm again. The invincibles entered the Kennington Oval field that day in a pitiful state. We were daft." At this time The Boat Race was considered a greater sporting event than the cup final.

By contrast, Albion captain Billy Bassett stated "Jack Ross lost his cool that day. that was the key. I managed to keep my cool and the cooler I kept, the rasher Ross got." Bassett also recalled that it was Ross' rashness that cost his side the winning goal as he charged at Bassett and ended up somersaulting clean over him. As he picked himself up he watched as Bassett was able to set up the clinching goal. Bassett however was complimentary of his opponents when, years later he stated "I have seen all the best sides in Football but I have never seen a side that compared to Preston North End at their best. We beat them but I do not pretend for a moment that we deserved to beat them."

== Match details ==
1887–88 FA Cup Final
24 March 1888
15:00 GMT

West Bromwich Albion	2–1	Preston North End
George Woodhall; Jem Bayliss		Fred Dewhurst

Kennington Oval, London
Attendance: 19,000
Referee: Francis Marindin

W.B. Albion	Preston N.E.

GK	Bob Roberts
DF	Albert Aldridge
DF	Harry Green
MF	Ezra Horton
MF	Charlie Perry
MF	George Timmins
FW	George Woodhall
FW	Billy Bassett
FW	Jem Bayliss (c)
FW	Joe Wilson
FW	Tom Pearson

GK	RH Mills-Roberts
DF	Bob Howarth
DF	Nick Ross
MF	Bob Holmes
MF	David Russell
MF	Johnny Graham
FW	Jack Gordon
FW	Jimmy Ross
FW	John Goodall
FW	Fred Dewhurst (c)
FW	George Drummond

MATCH RULES

- 90 minutes.
- 30 minutes of extra-time if necessary.
- Replay if scores still level.

== Legacy ==
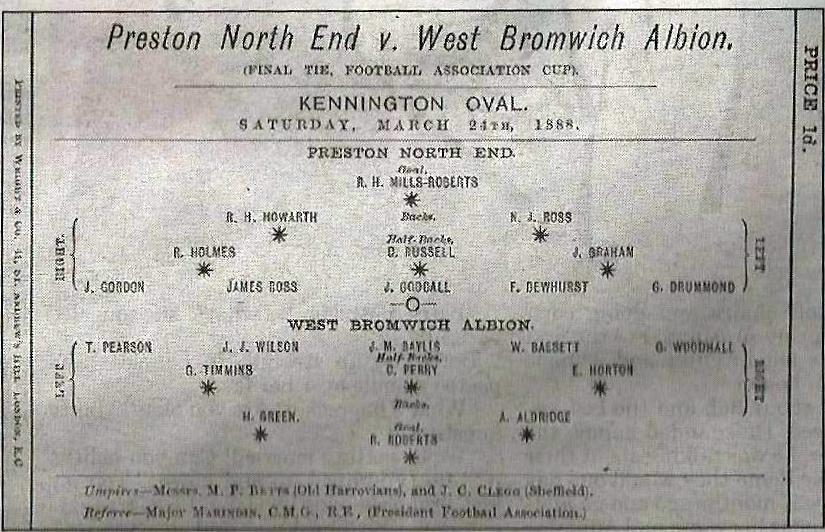
A copy of the game's programme was auctioned in 2015

In 2015 what was believed to be one of a small number of surviving copies of the programme from the Final, which originally sold for a penny, was put up for auction. The programme had at one time been owned by West Bromwich Albion director Harold Ely. At auction it achieved a sale price of £20,000.
