= Albert Millard =

English footballer (born 1868)

Personal information
- Date of birth: 1868
- Place of birth: West Bromwich, England
- Position: Half back

Senior career*
Years	Team	Apps	(Gls)
1888–1891	West Bromwich Albion	5	(0)
- * Club domestic league appearances and goals

Albert Millard (born 1868) was an English footballer who played in The Football League for West Bromwich Albion.
