= Joe Wilson (footballer, born 1861) =

English footballer

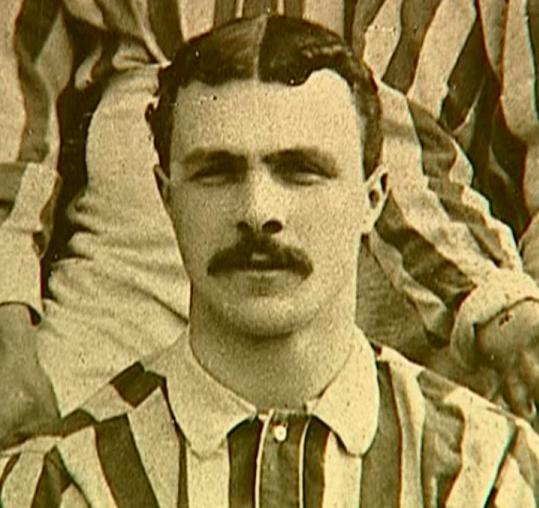

Personal information
- Full name: Joseph James Wilson
- Date of birth: 8 January 1861
- Place of birth: Birmingham, England
- Date of death: 20 October 1952 (aged 91)
- Place of death: Handsworth, England
- Position: Outside left

Senior career*
Years	Team	Apps	(Gls)
1877–1880	Hamstead Swifts		
1880–1885	Aston Unity		
1885	Stoke		
1885–1886	Walsall Town		
1886–1887	Aston Villa		
1887	Walsall Town		
1887–1890	West Bromwich Albion	40	(4)
1890–1891	Kidderminster Harriers		
1891–1892	Birmingham St George's		
- * Club domestic league appearances and goals

Joseph James Wilson (8 January 1861 – 20 October 1952) was an English footballer who played at outside left. During his 15-year playing career he represented several teams from the West Midlands region, both as an amateur and a professional. He gained an FA Cup winners medal with West Bromwich Albion and was the scorer of the club's first ever goal in The Football League.

== Biography ==
Wilson was born in Handsworth, Birmingham and attended St Mary's Council School and Handsworth Grammar School. He began his football career during the amateur era, joining Hamstead Swifts in 1877 before transferring to Aston Unity three years later. In September 1885 he moved to Stoke, but did not remain at the club for long as later that year he began playing for Walsall Town, the club that later merged with Walsall Swifts to form Walsall F.C. Wilson signed for Aston Villa in August 1886 before re-joining Walsall Town twelve months later. He remained at the latter club for just one month, then turned professional with West Bromwich Albion in September 1887.

He scored twice on his Albion debut against Wednesbury Old Athletic in October 1887, helping his club to a 7–1 victory in the FA Cup first round, and was a member of the team that beat Preston North End 2–1 in the 1888 FA Cup Final. 1888–89 was the first season of the newly formed Football League; Albion were one of the twelve founder members and travelled to Wilson's former club Stoke on 8 September 1888 for their first league fixture. In the final five minutes of the match, Wilson scored Albion's first ever league goal, which helped his team to achieve a 2–0 victory. Joe Wilson missed two of the "Throstles" 22 Football League matches and scored four goals in season 1888–89 and was part of a midfield that achieved a big (three goals or more) League win on two separate occasions.

In August 1890, Wilson was transferred to Kidderminster Harriers, where he played for twelve months before a move to Birmingham St George's. He retired from playing football in April 1892 and from 1894 to 1910 was a Football League referee and linesman, officiating in First Division, Second Division and FA Cup matches, as well as at Non-League level. Wilson later worked as a goldsmith in Birmingham's Jewellery Quarter for 25 years prior to the Second World War. He died in Acocks Green, Birmingham on 20 October 1952.

Described by one source as a smart, unobtrusive left-winger of dashing style and all-out aggression, Wilson kept defences on the alert with his cunning wing play.

== Career statistics ==
Appearances and goals by club, season and competition
Club	Season	League		FA Cup		Other		Total	
Club	Season	Apps	Goals	Apps	Goals	Apps	Goals	Apps	Goals
West Bromwich Albion	1887–88	0	0	7	6	0	0	7	6
West Bromwich Albion	1888–89	20	4	4	5	0	0	24	9
West Bromwich Albion	1889–90	20	4	2	1	0	0	22	5
Total		40	8	13	12	0	0	53	20
