= Harry Green (footballer, born 1860) =

English footballer

Personal information
- Full name: Harold Green
- Date of birth: 19 January 1860
- Place of birth: West Bromwich, England
- Date of death: May 1900 (aged 40)
- Place of death: West Bromwich, England
- Position: Full-back

Senior career*
Years	Team	Apps	(Gls)
1880–1891	West Bromwich Albion	33	(0)
- * Club domestic league appearances and goals

Harold Green (19 January 1860 – May 1900) was an English footballer who played at both right and left full-back.

== Career ==
Green was born in West Bromwich. He played for George Salter's Works before joining West Bromwich Albion. He played in three successive FA Cup Finals for Albion, picking up runners-up medals in 1886 and 1887 and a winner's medal in 1888 when Preston North End were defeated 2–1.

He made his league debut on 8 September 1888, at full-back for West Bromwich Albion in a 2–0 win against Stoke at the Victoria Ground, Stoke. He played nine of the "Throstles" 22 Football League matches and was part of a defence-line that achieved three clean-sheets whilst restricting the opposition to a single goal on one occasion.

Harry Green was described as an excellent full-back, meaningful, sure-footed and one of the best of his era.

In 1891 Green left Albion to join Old Hill Wanderers. He died in West Bromwich in May 1900. (Note: According to The Sporting Life dated 22/11/1900 (and reported elsewhere) he died of gout on 18/11/1900 leaving a widow and 5 children.)
