= Sammy Nicholls =

English footballer

Personal information
- Full name: Samuel Nicholls
- Date of birth: 1870
- Place of birth: West Bromwich, England
- Date of death: 1912 (aged 39–40)
- Position: Inside forward

Senior career*
Years	Team	Apps	(Gls)
1887–1888	Kidderminster Olympic		
1888–1889	West Bromwich Victoria		
1889–1892	West Bromwich Albion	33	(11)
1892–1893	London CBC		
1893–1894	West Bromwich Albion	8	(3)
Total		41	(14)
- * Club domestic league appearances and goals

Samuel Nicholls (1870–1912) was an English footballer who played in the Football League for West Bromwich Albion where he won the 1892 FA Cup Final, scoring in a 3–0 win against Aston Villa.

== Honours ==
West Bromwich Albion

- FA Cup: 1891–92
