= Willie Groves =

Scottish footballer (1868–1908)

Personal information
- Full name: Patrick William Groves
- Date of birth: 20 August 1868
- Place of birth: Hutchesontown, Glasgow, Scotland
- Date of death: 13 February 1908 (aged 39)
- Place of death: Edinburgh, Scotland
- Position: Striker

Senior career*
Years	Team	Apps	(Gls)
1885–1888	Hibernian (Note: The Scottish Football League did not commence until the 1890–91 season.)	0	(0)
1888–1890	Celtic	2	(2)
1890–1893	West Bromwich Albion	58	(7)
1893–1894	Aston Villa	22	(4)
1895–1896	Hibernian	5	(1)
1896	Celtic	2	(1)
Total		89	(15)

International career
1888–1890	Scotland	3	(4)
1892	Football League XI	1	(0)
- * Club domestic league appearances and goals

Patrick William Groves (20 August 1868 – 13 February 1908) was a Scottish footballer who played as a forward for Hibernian, Celtic, West Bromwich Albion, Aston Villa and Scotland. He is known for being the first player to be transferred for more than £100 (£10,902.30 in 2025), or roughly half the average price of a house at the time, becoming the first official record holder for the most expensive transfer ever. The record-setting transfer was from West Bromwich Albion F.C. to Aston Villa F.C. in 1893 for exactly £100. Three years later, in 1896, Groves' record was broken when Fred Wheldon was transferred to Aston Villa F.C. from Small Heath Alliance (now Birmingham City F.C.) for between £350 and £500.

== Career ==
=== Hibernian ===
Groves, an inside forward, first broke into the Hibernian squad as a 16-year-old during the 1885–86 season. He featured prominently as Hibs won the Scottish Cup the following year, scoring in the first round, second round replay and semi-final. Vale of Leven, Hibs' opponents in the semi-final, protested that Groves had accepted a payment from Hibs, which would have been illegal as the Scottish game was still amateur at the time. The protest was not heard until after Hibs had defeated Dumbarton in the final. Vale of Leven only presented hearsay as evidence, but it took the casting vote of the committee chairman to exonerate Hibs.

In the following year, Groves made his international debut, in an 1888 British Home Championship match against Wales. Groves scored the fourth goal in a 5–1 win for Scotland at Hibernian Park, Hibs' home ground.

=== Celtic ===
By August 1888, Groves was one of several Hibs players who moved to the newly formed Celtic. He scored ten goals in the club's 1888–89 Scottish Cup campaign. Groves made two further appearances for the Scotland national football team while with Celtic. In one of those appearances he scored a hat-trick against Ireland in the 1889 British Home Championship.

=== West Bromwich Albion ===
Groves moved to the professional English Football League in 1890, signing for West Bromwich Albion. He helped Albion win the 1892 FA Cup Final, playing at half-back as Aston Villa were defeated 3–0.

=== Aston Villa ===
Groves subsequently signed for Villa in 1893, becoming the first player to be transferred for over £100. Villa were forced to pay that fee (around £16,000 in today's values) to West Brom and were fined by the Football Association amidst allegations that Groves and Jack Reynolds had been illegally poached. He helped Villa win the league championship in 1894. During his time in England, Groves played for the Football League against the Scottish League. He left Villa in November 1894 after a dispute over his contract with the club arose.

=== Return to Scotland ===
After Hibs were elected to join the top division of the Scottish Football League in 1895, Groves returned to the club. During this second spell he played in the 1896 Scottish Cup Final, which Hibs lost 3–1 to Edinburgh derby rivals Hearts. This final is perhaps best known for being the only Scottish Cup Final to be played outside Glasgow. He then briefly returned to Celtic, but soon retired, suffering from tuberculosis. He died in Edinburgh in 1908, aged 39.

== See also ==
- List of Scotland national football team hat-tricks
- Progression of British football transfer fee record
