= George Haynes (footballer) =

English footballer

Personal information
- Full name: George Harold Haynes
- Date of birth: 1869
- Place of birth: West Bromwich, England
- Date of death: 1953 (aged 83–84)
- Position: Left winger

Senior career*
Years	Team	Apps	(Gls)
- West Bromwich Sandwel
1888–1891	West Bromwich Albion	11	(1)
- Coles Farm Unity
- * Club domestic league appearances and goals

George Harold Haynes (born 1869) was an English footballer who played in The Football League for West Bromwich Albion.
