= George Woodhall =

English footballer

Personal information
- Full name: George Woodhall
- Date of birth: 5 September 1863
- Place of birth: West Bromwich, England
- Date of death: 29 September 1924 (aged 61)
- Positions: Centre forward; outside right

Senior career*
Years	Team	Apps	(Gls)
- West Bromwich All Saints
- Churchfield Foresters
1883–1892	West Bromwich Albion	44	(10)
1892–1894	Wolverhampton Wanderers	18	(1)
- Berwick Rangers (Worcester)
- Oldbury Town

International career
1888	England	2	(1)
- * Club domestic league appearances and goals

George "Spry" Woodhall (5 September 1863 – 29 September 1924) was an English footballer, who played most of his career with West Bromwich Albion, helping them to reach three consecutive FA Cup finals, including winning the cup in 1888.

Woodhall was born in West Bromwich and, after playing for West Bromwich All Saints and Churchfield Foresters, joined West Bromwich Albion in May 1883. He was a member of the West Bromwich team that reached the 1886 and 1887 cup finals, going out 2–0 to Blackburn Rovers (in a replay) and Aston Villa respectively.

In 1888, West Bromwich reached the final for the third consecutive year, when they met favourites, Preston North End at the Kennington Oval on 24 March 1888. Woodhall scored the winning goal with thirteen minutes remaining, when the West Bromwich forwards outjumped Preston's defence and Woodhall pounced on the rebound, turning sharply to steer the ball between the posts, thus enabling his team to claim the first of their five FA Cup victories.

Spry Woodhall made his League debut on 8 September 1888, as a forward for West Bromwich Albion in a 2–0 win against Stoke at the Victoria Ground. He also scored the second goal in the match. He played ten of the "Throstles" 22 Football League matches and scored three goals in season 1888-89 and was part of a forward-line that scored three goals or more in a League match on one occasion.

Described by one source as well-nicknamed, for he was indeed a sprightly player, figuring prominently at outside-right for Albion in the early days. He could centre with great accuracy and combined well in team work, especially with Billy Bassett as his partner.

Woodhall represented England twice, making his debut against Wales on 4 February 1888, when he scored the third goal in a 5–1 victory. Woodhall's goal was England's 100th international goal. He also played in the next match against Scotland which was won 5–0; the following month, England defeated Ireland 5–1 (although Woodhall was not selected, his place on the right wing going to his West Bromwich team-mate Billy Bassett) to claim the 1888 British Home Championship convincingly.

== Honours ==
West Bromwich Albion

- FA Cup winners: 1888
- FA Cup runners-up: 1886, 1887
