= Charlie Perry (footballer, born 1866) =

English footballer

Personal information
- Date of birth: 3 January 1866
- Place of birth: West Bromwich, England
- Date of death: 2 July 1927 (aged 61)
- Place of death: West Bromwich, England
- Position: Centre-half

Youth career
- 1884–1885: West Bromwich Albion

Senior career*
Years	Team	Apps	(Gls)
1885–1896	West Bromwich Albion	171	(12)

International career
	England	3	(0)
- * Club domestic league appearances and goals

Charles Perry (3 January 1866 – 2 July 1927) was an English football centre-half who played for West Bromwich Albion and England.

== Biography ==
Perry was born in West Bromwich. He joined West Bromwich Albion in March 1884 and turned professional in August 1885. He made his first team debut in the 1886 FA Cup Final against Blackburn Rovers at The Oval, a match that finished 0–0. Perry collected a runners-up medal after Albion lost 2–0 in the replay. He was on the losing side once more in the 1887 final, in a 2–0 defeat to Aston Villa. He picked up his first winner's medal in 1888 as Albion beat Preston North End 2–1.

Charlie Perry made his league debut on 8 September 1888, at centre-half for West Bromwich Albion in a 2–0 win against Stoke at the Victoria Ground, Stoke. He played 20 of the "Throstles" 22 Football League matches and was part of a defence-line that achieved four clean-sheets whilst restricting the opposition to a single goal on four occasions.

Charlie Perry had another winner's medal in the 3–0 win over Aston Villa in 1892. However, he missed the 1895 FA Cup Final due to an injury that later forced his retirement in May 1896. Perry made 219 career appearances for Albion in all competitions, scoring 16 goals. From 1896 until 1902 he served the club as a director.

Charlie Perry had a polished style, played defence well from the centre-half position, which was undoubtedly his best.

His younger brother, Tom also played for West Bromwich Albion from 1890 to 1901 and made one England appearance.

== Honours ==
West Bromwich Albion

- FA Cup winner: 1888 & 1892
- FA Cup runner-up: 1886 & 1887
