= Tom Pearson (footballer) =

English footballer

Personal information
- Full name: Thomas Pearson
- Date of birth: 20 May 1866
- Place of birth: West Bromwich, England
- Date of death: 4 July 1918 (aged 52)
- Place of death: West Bromwich, England
- Position: Inside left

Senior career*
Years	Team	Apps	(Gls)
1886–1894	West Bromwich Albion	138	(72)
- * Club domestic league appearances and goals

Thomas Pearson (20 May 1866 – 4 July 1918) was an English footballer who played at inside-left.

== Career ==
Pearson was born in West Bromwich. He turned professional with West Bromwich Albion in April 1886 and made his debut in February 1887 against Notts County in the sixth round of the FA Cup. Tom Pearson made his League debut on 8 September 1888, as a forward for West Bromwich Albion in a 2–0 win against Stoke at the Victoria Ground. Tom Pearson scored his debut League goal on 15 September 1888 at County Ground against Derby County. West Bromwich Albion won the match 2–1. He played all of the "Throstles" 22 Football League matches and scored twelve League goals in season 1888-89 and was part of a forward-line that scored three goals or more in a League match on five occasions. Tom Pearson scored one hat-trick and two-in-a-match on two separate occasions in season 1888–89. He became the first player to score a league hat-trick for Albion when he scored three goals in the club's 5–0 win against Derby County on 6 October 1888. In a friendly match at home against Aston Villa on 11 January 1892, Pearson took Albion's first ever penalty kick, but failed to score when he struck the ball over the crossbar.

He was Albion's top league scorer during their first five seasons in the Football League, including two seasons tied with Billy Bassett for the honour. In 1889-90 Season he scored 17 League goals (his best season for goals). He scored three hat-tricks. On 4 November 1889 he scored four as "Albion' defeated Bolton Wanderers 6-3 at Stoney Lane. On 21 December 1889 he scored three against Accrington as "Albion" won 4-1, again at Stoney Lane. Finally, on 4 January 1890 Pearson scored three as "Albion" beat Notts County 4-2 at Stoney Lane.

Pearson retired in May 1894 due to a serious leg injury. He died in West Bromwich in 1918.

Pearson was described by Tony Matthews as an inside-left who had endurance, resolution, shooting power (with both feet) and a short gait, as well as a natural goalscorer, whose alertness and presence of mind brought him well over 150 goals.

== Honours ==
West Bromwich Albion

- FA Cup: 1888; runner-up 1887
