= Jem Bayliss =

English footballer (1863–1933)

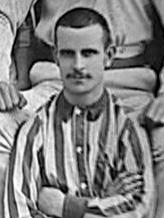

Personal information
- Full name: Albert Edward James Matthias Bayliss
- Date of birth: 1 August 1863
- Place of birth: Tipton, England
- Date of death: 19 August 1933 (aged 70)
- Place of death: West Bromwich, England
- Positions: Wing half; forward

Youth career
- Great Bridge Unity
- Tipton Providence
- Wednesbury Old Athletic

Senior career*
Years	Team	Apps	(Gls)
1884–1891	West Bromwich Albion	56	(13)
1891	Walsall Town Swifts		

International career
1891	England	1	(0)
- * Club domestic league appearances and goals

Albert Edward James Matthias Bayliss (1 August 1863 – 19 August 1933), known as Jem Bayliss, was an English footballer who played for West Bromwich Albion, as well as the England national side.

He captained the West Bromwich Albion side which won the 1888 FA Cup Final.

He made his league debut on 8 September 1888, at wing-half for West Bromwich Albion in a 2–0 win against Stoke at the Victoria Ground, Stoke. He played all of the "Throstles"' 22 Football League matches and scored two goals in 1888–89. His debut League goal was scored on 22 September 1888 at Leamington Road, Blackburn, in a match that West Bromwich Albion lost to Blackburn Rovers 6–2. Bayliss also played as a forward in 1888–89.
