= Billy Bassett =

English footballer (1869–1937)

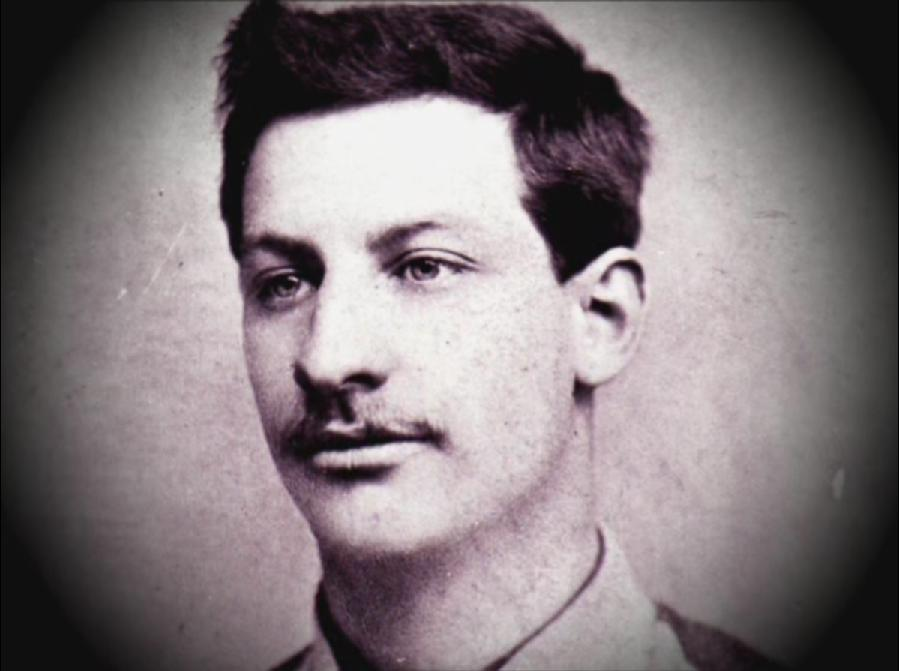

Personal information
- Full name: William Isiah Bassett
- Date of birth: 27 January 1869
- Place of birth: West Bromwich, England
- Date of death: 9 April 1937 (aged 68)
- Place of death: West Bromwich, England
- Position: Outside right

Senior career*
Years	Team	Apps	(Gls)
1884–1885	West Bromwich Strollers		
1885–1886	Old Church F.C.		
1886–1899	West Bromwich Albion	261	(61)

International career
1888–1896	England	16	(8)
- * Club domestic league appearances and goals

William Isiah Bassett (27 January 1869 – 8 April 1937) was an English association footballer, director, and club chairman who served West Bromwich Albion for over half a century.

== Biography ==
=== Playing career ===
Born in West Bromwich, the eldest of a coal merchant's six children, at only 5 feet 5 inches (1.65 m), Bassett was initially considered too frail for a professional player. Establishing himself as a winger in various local amateur sides, he joined West Bromwich Albion in 1886, playing outside-right. Bassett made his League debut on 8 September 1888, as a winger for West Bromwich Albion in a 2–0 win against Stoke at the Victoria Ground. Bassett scored his debut League goal on 15 September 1888 at the County Ground, against Derby County. West Bromwich Albion won the match 2–1. He missed one of the "Throstles"' 22 Football League matches and scored 11 goals in season 1888–89 and was part of a midfield that achieved a big (three goals or more) League win on two separate occasions. His 11 league goals included one brace. When he made his League debut he was 19 years 225 days old; that made him, on that first day of League football, West Bromwich Albion's youngest player. He played 261 Football League games for the club, scoring 61 goals, and he also won 16 England caps and scored 8 goals, becoming one of the game's earliest celebrities. On 28 April 1894, Bassett became the first ever Albion player to be sent off: he was dismissed for using "unparliamentary language" in a friendly match away at Millwall. Described by one source as quick, direct and highly effective, he possessed superb ball-control and could score goals as well as make them. Bassett made his 311th and final competitive appearance for Albion on the last day of the 1898–99 season, lining up in a 7–1 defeat away against Aston Villa.

=== Director and chairman ===
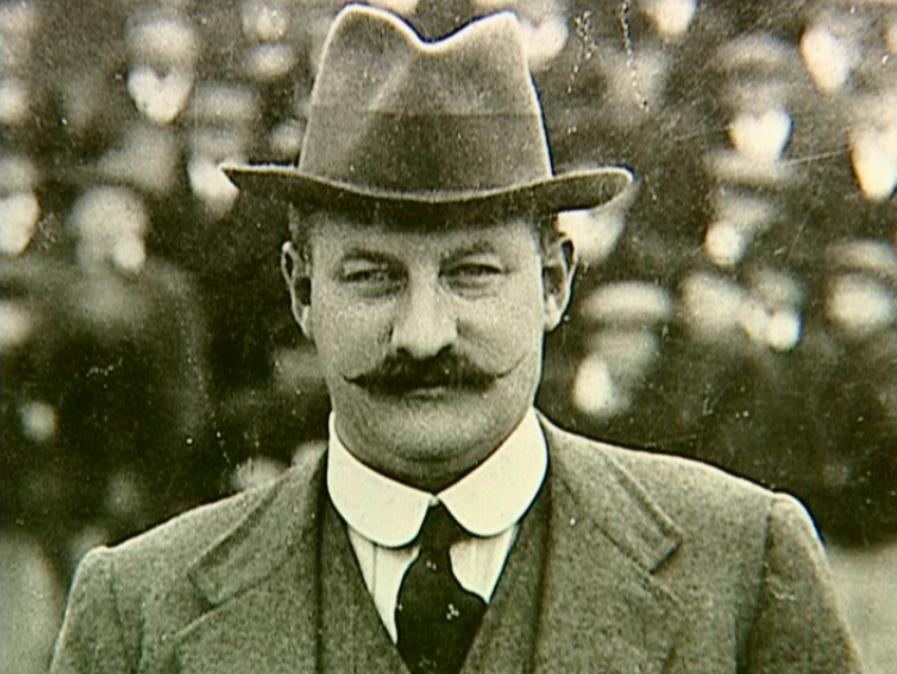
Bassett as chairman of West Bromwich Albion

Bassett became an Albion director in 1905, following the resignation of the previous board in its entirety. The club was in deep financial trouble and had had a writ served upon them by their bank, but Bassett and returning chairman Harry Keys rescued the club, aided by local fund-raising activities. Bassett became chairman in 1908, and helped the club to avoid bankruptcy once more in 1910 by paying the players' summer wages from his own pocket. He remained Albion's chair until his death.

His activities in the wider footballing world let him to take an active role in the development of both the Football Association and the Football League. The strength of England's rivalry with Scotland had led Bassett to develop a "distaste" for Scots during his playing days, and throughout his 29-year chairmanship Albion did not sign a single Scottish player.

=== Death and legacy ===
Billy Bassett died in West Bromwich on 8 April 1937 at the age of 68. Two days after his death, a minute silence was held prior to Albion's 4–1 defeat to Preston North End in the FA Cup semi-final at Highbury. The Albion players were clearly affected, with Teddy Sandford saying:

We were all too full up to play. Mr Bassett's death stunned the whole team – even the supporters. He was such a well-respected person. He taught me a lot and I must admit that I was tearful for most of the first half following the minute's silence before the kickoff.

More than 100,000 people lined the streets of West Bromwich for Bassett's funeral procession.

In 1998, he was listed among the Football League 100 Legends, while in 2004 he was named as one of West Bromwich Albion's 16 greatest players, in a poll organised as part of the club's 125th anniversary celebrations.

== Honours ==
West Bromwich Albion

- FA Cup: 1888, 1892
