= Stoney Lane =

Football ground in West Bromwich, England

- Interactive map of Stoney Lane
- Location: West Bromwich, England
- Coordinates: 52.5237°N 1.9902°W
- Surface: Grass
- Record attendance: 20,977

Construction
- Opened: 1885
- Closed: 1900
- Demolished: 1900

Tenant
- West Bromwich Albion

Stoney Lane was a football ground in West Bromwich, England. It was the home ground of West Bromwich Albion from 1885 until 1900.

== History ==
West Bromwich Albion moved to Stoney Lane in 1885 from their Four Acres ground in 1885. A 600-seat grandstand was built on the southern touchline, with open wooden stands on each side of the grandstand. Banking was raised on the northern touchline.

In 1888 West Bromwich Albion were founder members of the Football League, and the first league match was played at Stoney Lane on 29 September 1888, with West Brom beating Burnley 4–3 with 2,100 in attendance. The ground's record league attendance of 19,700 was set on 5 January 1895 when West Brom lost 5–4 to Preston North End, whilst the overall record attendance of 20,977 was set in March 1895, for Albion's 1–0 victory over local rivals Wolverhampton Wanderers in the FA Cup third round.

At the end of the 1899–1900 season the club moved to the Hawthorns, taking the wooden grandstand with them. The final league match was played at Stoney Lane on 16 April 1900, with West Brom beating Nottingham Forest 8–0. Stoney Lane remained in use as a training ground for some time, and was later known as the Fairground because of its use by visiting fairs. It was used to build a housing estate in the 1980s. The area which was covered by the pitch is now a road named Albion Field Drive.
