= 1893–94 West Bromwich Albion F.C. season =

West Bromwich Albion
1893–94 season
- Chairman: George Salter
- Manager: Henry Jackson
- Stadium: Stoney Lane
- Football League: 8th
- FA Cup: First round
- Top goalscorer: League: Roddy McLeod (14); All: Roddy McLeod (16)
Home colours

The 1893–94 season was the 16th season in the history of West Bromwich Albion and their 6th season in the Football League. Albion finished the season in 8th position.

== Final League table ==
Pos	Team	Pld	W	D	L	GF	GA	GAv	Pts
6	Everton	30	15	3	12	90	57	1.579	33
7	Nottingham Forest	30	14	4	12	57	48	1.188	32
8	West Bromwich Albion	30	14	4	12	66	59	1.119	32
9	Wolverhampton Wanderers	30	14	3	13	52	63	0.825	31
10	Sheffield United	30	13	5	12	47	61	0.770	31

Source: World Football
Rules for classification: 1) Points; 2) Goal average; 3) Goals scored

== Results ==
West Bromwich Albion's score comes first

=== Legend ===
Win	Draw	Loss

=== Football League ===
Match	Date	Opponent	Venue	Result	Attendance	Scorers
1	2 September 1893	Aston Villa	A	2–3	15,100	Geddes, Cowan (o.g.)
2	9 September 1893	Newton Heath	H	3–1	4,500	Pearson, McLeod, Nicholls
3	16 September 1893	Derby County	A	3–2	7,000	McLeod (2), Nicholls
4	23 September 1893	Burnley	H	1–1	3,000	McLeod
5	25 September 1893	Sheffield Wednesday	A	4–2	6,000	Bassett (2), Geddes (2)
6	30 September 1893	Nottingham Forest	A	3–2	5,000	McLeod (2), Bassett
7	7 October 1893	Wolverhampton Wanderers	H	0–0	10,000	
8	14 October 1893	Newton Heath	A	1–4	8,000	Norman
9	21 October 1893	Aston Villa	H	3–6	14,000	C. Perry, Geddes, McLeod
10	28 October 1893	Sheffield United	A	2–0	6,000	Bassett, Neale
11	4 November 1893	Stoke	H	4–2	3,000	C. Perry (2), McLeod, Nicholls
12	6 November 1893	Bolton Wanderers	H	5–2	4,000	Neale, Pearson (4)
13	11 November 1893	Darwen	A	1–2	2,000	Neale
14	25 November 1893	Sunderland	A	1–2	9,500	Bassett
15	27 November 1893	Sheffield Wednesday	H	2–2	4,828	Bastock, McLeod
16	4 December 1893	Preston North End	H	2–0	2,000	Norman (2)
17	9 December 1893	Burnley	A	0–3	5,000	
18	16 December 1893	Darwen	H	2–2	2,000	McLeod, Bassett
19	23 December 1893	Sunderland	H	2–3	7,500	Geddes (2)
20	26 December 1893	Sheffield United	H	3–1	7,000	Bassett, Pearson, Norman
21	27 December 1893	Wolverhampton Wanderers	A	8–0	8,000	McLeod (3), Bassett (3), C. Perry, Williams
22	30 December 1893	Everton	A	1–7	14,000	Williams
23	6 January 1894	Blackburn Rovers	H	2–1	2,024	Williams, Hadley
24	13 January 1894	Blackburn Rovers	A	0–3	6,000	
25	20 January 1894	Stoke	A	1–3	3,000	Bassett
26	3 February 1894	Everton	H	3–1	3,000	Williams (2), Pearson
27	3 March 1894	Preston North End	A	1–3	5,000	McLeod
28	24 March 1894	Derby County	H	0–1	3,000	
29	26 March 1894	Nottingham Forest	H	3–0	7,000	Bastock, Williams (2)
30	7 April 1894	Bolton Wanderers	A	3–0	3,500	Geddes, Bastock (2)

=== FA Cup ===
Round	Date	Opponent	Venue	Result	Attendance	Scorers
R1	27 January 1894	Blackburn Rovers	H	2–3	10,243	McLeod (2)

== See also ==
- 1893–94 in English football
- List of West Bromwich Albion F.C. seasons
