= 1983–84 Football League =

85th season of the Football League

The Football League
- Season: 1983–84
- Champions: Liverpool

The 1983–84 season was the 85th completed season of The Football League.

Liverpool had a successful first season under the management of Joe Fagan as they wrapped up their third successive league title and the 15th in their history. They overcame strong competition from Southampton, Nottingham Forest and Manchester United to lift the championship trophy. Liverpool had an extremely strong season, as they also won the European Cup and the League Cup.

Southampton finished second in the league to record their highest-ever final position and achieve a UEFA Cup place, claiming six points from the last two games (both away) to climb up from fifth place.

The First Division relegation places were occupied by Birmingham City, Notts County and Wolverhampton Wanderers.

The £1 rescue deal of Chelsea by chairman Ken Bates paid off as they won the Second Division title and were promoted to the First Division along with Sheffield Wednesday and Newcastle United.

Cambridge United finished bottom of the Second Division and were relegated to the Third Division. They were joined by two clubs who had been enjoying better fortunes only a short time ago — Swansea City, who had finished sixth in the First Division just two years earlier, and Derby County, who had been league champions just nine years earlier. Derby's Peter Taylor retired as manager and his surprise successor was Arthur Cox, who had just taken Newcastle into the First Division.

Dave Bassett agreed to take charge of Crystal Palace at the end of the season, but changed his mind three days later — without signing the contract — and returned to Wimbledon. Palace installed former Manchester United winger Steve Coppell, 29, as their new manager.

Oxford United, Wimbledon and Sheffield United continued their rise through the league by gaining promotion to the Second Division.

Scunthorpe United, Southend United, Port Vale and Exeter City slipped out of the Third Division.

Narrowly avoiding the Third Division drop zone were Plymouth Argyle, who compensated for their league form by reaching the FA Cup semi finals for the first time in their history.

York City, Doncaster Rovers, Reading and Bristol City occupied the Fourth Division promotion places. York City became the first team in English league football to gain more than 100 points in a season, with 101. It was Bristol City's first successful season for a long time and a reversal of fortune after their recent fall from the First to Fourth Division in successive seasons.

The re-election system voted in favour of the bottom four clubs in the Fourth Division once again.

== Final league tables and results ==
The tables and results below are reproduced here in the exact form that they can be found at The Rec.Sport.Soccer Statistics Foundation website, with home and away statistics separated.

During the first five seasons of the league, that is, until the season 1893–94, re-election process concerned the clubs which finished in the bottom four of the league. From the 1894–95 season and until the 1920–21 season the re-election process was required of the clubs which finished in the bottom three of the league. From the 1922–23 season on it was required of the bottom two teams of both Third Division North and Third Division South. Since the Fourth Division was established in the 1958–59 season, the re-election process has concerned the bottom four clubs in that division.

== First Division ==
First Division
- Season: 1983–84
- Champions: Liverpool; 15th English title
- Relegated: Birmingham City; Notts County; Wolverhampton Wanderers
- European Cup: Liverpool
- European Cup Winners' Cup: Everton
- UEFA Cup: Manchester United; Nottingham Forest; Queens Park Rangers; Southampton; Tottenham Hotspur (as defending champions)
- Matches: 462
- Goals: 1,250 (2.71 per match)
- Top goalscorer: Ian Rush (32 goals)
- Biggest home win: Southampton 8–2 Coventry City (28 April 1984)
- Biggest away win: Luton Town 0–5 Manchester United (12 February 1984)
- Highest scoring: Southampton 8–2 Coventry City (28 April 1984)
- Longest winning run: 6 matches Queens Park Rangers
- Longest unbeaten run: 16 matches Manchester United
- Longest losing run: 7 matches Ipswich Town; Notts County

Liverpool won the league title for a third successive season, although it was a much closer contest than the previous season. They also lifted a fourth consecutive League Cup and also their fourth European Cup in eight seasons to become the first English team to win three major trophies in the same season.

Their biggest rivals in the title race were Manchester United, who led the table at several stages of the season before dropping points in several crucial games later in the season to finish fourth. Southampton enjoyed their best league season to date with a second place finish, while Nottingham Forest finished third and also reached the semi-finals of the UEFA Cup. Queens Park Rangers, newly promoted, finished top of all the London clubs with a fifth place final position - which saw manager Terry Venables offered the job as manager of FC Barcelona, which he duly accepted. Tottenham Hotspur were unable to sustain a title challenge but lifted the UEFA Cup in Keith Burkinshaw's final season as manager.

Luton Town were surprise title contenders during the first half of the season before a dismal second half of the season saw them finish 16th.

Watford, the previous season's runners-up, began the season struggling near the foot of the table, before manager Graham Taylor brought Scottish striker Mo Johnston to the club as successor to Luther Blissett, and his new signing scored 20 goals as Watford climbed to a secure 11th place finish.

Everton were in the bottom half of the table and fans were calling for manager Howard Kendall to be sacked in November 1983, but the board kept the faith in their manager and gave him the green light to sign Wolverhampton Wanderers' striker Andy Gray, who revived Everton's season as they climbed up to seventh place in the final table and ended their 14-year wait for a major trophy by beating Watford 2–0 in the final of the FA Cup. Gray was cup-tied for Everton's League Cup fixtures, but they still reached the final and took Liverpool to a replay before losing 1–0.

Just one season after winning promotion back to the First Division, Wolves went straight back down to the Second Division in bottom place. Notts County were next to go down, having survived for three seasons in the First Division. The final relegation place went to Birmingham City.

=== Final table ===
Pos	Team	Pld	W	D	L	GF	GA	GD	Pts	Qualification or relegation
1	Liverpool (C)	42	22	14	6	73	32	+41	80	Qualification for the European Cup first round
2	Southampton	42	22	11	9	66	38	+28	77	Qualification for the UEFA Cup first round
3	Nottingham Forest	42	22	8	12	76	45	+31	74	Qualification for the UEFA Cup first round
4	Manchester United	42	20	14	8	71	41	+30	74	Qualification for the UEFA Cup first round
5	Queens Park Rangers	42	22	7	13	67	37	+30	73	Qualification for the UEFA Cup first round
6	Arsenal	42	18	9	15	74	60	+14	63	
7	Everton	42	16	14	12	44	42	+2	62	Qualification for the European Cup Winners' Cup first round (Note: Everton qualified for the European Cup Winners' Cup as the 1983–84 FA Cup winners.)
8	Tottenham Hotspur	42	17	10	15	64	65	−1	61	Qualification for the UEFA Cup first round (Note: Tottenham Hotspur qualified for the UEFA Cup as the 1983–84 UEFA Cup winners.)
9	West Ham United	42	17	9	16	60	55	+5	60	
10	Aston Villa	42	17	9	16	59	61	−2	60	
11	Watford	42	16	9	17	68	77	−9	57	
12	Ipswich Town	42	15	8	19	55	57	−2	53	
13	Sunderland	42	13	13	16	42	53	−11	52	
14	Norwich City	42	12	15	15	48	49	−1	51	
15	Leicester City	42	13	12	17	65	68	−3	51	
16	Luton Town	42	14	9	19	53	66	−13	51	
17	West Bromwich Albion	42	14	9	19	48	62	−14	51	
18	Stoke City	42	13	11	18	44	63	−19	50	
19	Coventry City	42	13	11	18	57	77	−20	50	
20	Birmingham City (R)	42	12	12	18	39	50	−11	48	Relegation to the Second Division
21	Notts County (R)	42	10	11	21	50	72	−22	41	Relegation to the Second Division
22	Wolverhampton Wanderers (R)	42	6	11	25	27	80	−53	29	Relegation to the Second Division

Source: World Football
Rules for classification: 1) Points; 2) Goal difference; 3) Goals scored
(C) Champions; (R) Relegated

=== First Division results ===
Home \ Away	ARS	AST	BIR	COV	EVE	IPS	LEI	LIV	LUT	MUN	NWC	NOT	NTC	QPR	SOU	STK	SUN	TOT	WAT	WBA	WHU	WOL
Arsenal		1–1	1–1	0–1	2–1	4–1	2–1	0–2	2–1	2–3	3–0	4–1	1–1	0–2	2–2	3–1	1–2	3–2	3–1	0–1	3–3	4–1
Aston Villa	2–6		1–0	2–0	0–2	4–0	3–1	1–3	0–0	0–3	1–0	1–0	3–1	2–1	1–0	1–1	1–0	0–0	2–1	4–3	1–0	4–0
Birmingham City	1–1	2–1		1–2	0–2	1–0	2–1	0–0	1–1	2–2	0–1	1–2	0–0	0–2	0–0	1–0	0–1	0–1	2–0	2–1	3–0	0–0
Coventry City	1–4	3–3	0–1		1–1	1–2	2–1	4–0	2–2	1–1	2–1	2–1	2–1	1–0	0–0	2–3	2–1	2–4	1–2	1–2	1–2	2–1
Everton	0–0	1–1	1–1	0–0		1–0	1–1	1–1	0–1	1–1	0–2	1–0	4–1	3–1	1–0	1–0	0–0	2–1	1–0	0–0	0–1	2–0
Ipswich Town	1–0	2–1	1–2	3–1	3–0		0–0	1–1	3–0	0–2	2–0	2–2	1–0	0–2	0–3	5–0	1–0	3–1	0–0	3–4	0–3	3–1
Leicester City	3–0	2–0	2–3	1–1	2–0	2–0		3–3	0–3	1–1	2–1	2–1	0–4	2–1	2–1	2–2	0–2	0–3	4–1	1–1	4–1	5–1
Liverpool	2–1	2–1	1–0	5–0	3–0	2–2	2–2		6–0	1–1	1–1	1–0	5–0	2–0	1–1	1–0	0–1	3–1	3–0	3–0	6–0	0–1
Luton Town	1–2	1–0	1–1	2–4	0–3	2–1	0–0	0–0		0–5	2–2	2–3	3–2	0–0	3–1	0–1	4–1	2–4	1–2	2–0	0–1	4–0
Manchester United	4–0	1–2	1–0	4–1	0–1	1–2	2–0	1–0	2–0		0–0	1–2	3–3	3–1	3–2	1–0	2–1	4–2	4–1	3–0	0–0	3–0
Norwich City	1–1	3–1	1–1	0–0	1–1	0–0	3–1	0–1	0–0	3–3		2–3	0–1	0–3	1–0	2–2	3–0	2–1	6–1	2–0	1–0	3–0
Nottingham Forest	0–1	2–2	5–1	3–0	1–0	2–1	3–2	0–1	1–0	2–0	3–0		3–1	3–2	0–1	0–0	1–1	2–2	5–1	3–1	3–0	5–0
Notts County	0–4	5–2	2–1	2–1	0–1	0–2	2–5	0–0	0–3	1–0	1–1	0–0		0–3	1–3	1–1	6–1	0–0	3–5	1–1	2–2	4–0
Queens Park Rangers	2–0	2–1	2–1	2–1	2–0	1–0	2–0	0–1	0–1	1–1	2–0	0–1	1–0		4–0	6–0	3–0	2–1	1–1	1–1	1–1	2–1
Southampton	1–0	2–2	2–1	8–2	3–1	3–2	2–2	2–0	2–1	3–0	2–1	0–1	0–2	0–0		3–1	1–1	5–0	1–0	1–0	2–0	1–0
Stoke City	1–0	1–0	2–1	1–3	1–1	1–0	0–1	2–0	2–4	0–1	2–0	1–1	1–0	1–2	1–1		2–1	1–1	0–4	3–1	3–1	4–0
Sunderland	2–2	0–1	2–1	1–0	2–1	1–1	1–1	0–0	2–0	0–1	1–1	1–1	0–0	1–0	0–2	2–2		1–1	3–0	3–0	0–1	3–2
Tottenham Hotspur	2–4	2–1	0–1	1–1	1–2	2–0	3–2	2–2	2–1	1–1	2–0	2–1	1–0	3–2	0–0	1–0	3–0		2–3	0–1	0–2	1–0
Watford	2–1	3–2	1–0	2–3	4–4	2–2	3–3	0–2	1–2	0–0	1–3	3–2	3–1	1–0	1–1	2–0	2–1	2–3		3–1	0–0	0–0
West Bromwich Albion	1–3	3–1	1–2	1–1	1–1	2–1	1–0	1–2	3–0	2–0	0–0	0–5	2–0	1–2	0–2	3–0	3–1	1–1	2–0		1–0	1–3
West Ham United	3–1	0–1	4–0	5–2	0–1	2–1	3–1	1–3	3–1	1–1	0–0	1–2	3–0	2–2	0–1	3–0	0–1	4–1	2–4	1–0		1–1
Wolverhampton Wanderers	1–2	1–1	1–1	0–0	3–0	0–3	1–0	1–1	1–2	1–1	2–0	1–0	0–1	0–4	0–1	0–0	0–0	2–3	0–5	0–0	0–3	

Legend: Blue = home team win; Yellow = draw; Red = away team win.

=== Managerial changes ===
Team	Outgoing manager	Manner of departure	Date of vacancy	Position in table	Incoming manager	Date of appointment
Coventry City	(England) Dave Sexton	Sacked	27 May 1983	Pre-season	(England) Bobby Gould	12 June 1983
Liverpool	(England) Bob Paisley	Retired	1 June 1983	Pre-season	(England) Joe Fagan	1 June 1983
Notts County	(England) Howard Wilkinson	Signed by Sheffield Wednesday	2 June 1983	Pre-season	(England) Larry Lloyd	7 July 1983
Stoke City	(England) Richie Barker	Sacked	9 December 1983	21st	(England) Bill Asprey	9 December 1983
Arsenal	(Northern Ireland) Terry Neill	Sacked	16 December 1983	15th	(England) Don Howe	16 December 1983
West Bromwich Albion	(Scotland) Ron Wylie	Sacked	13 February 1984	17th	(Republic of Ireland) Johnny Giles	14 February 1984
Sunderland	(Wales) Alan Durban	Sacked	2 March 1984	16th	(England) Len Ashurst	5 March 1984
Wolverhampton Wanderers	(England) Graham Hawkins	Sacked	2 April 1984	22nd	(England) Jim Barron (caretaker)	2 April 1984

=== First Division maps ===
Locations of the Football League First Division London teams 1983–1984
Locations of the Football League First Division 1983–1984 teams

== Second Division ==
Second Division
- Season: 1983–84
- Champions: Chelsea
- Promoted: Chelsea; Sheffield Wednesday; Newcastle United
- Relegated: Derby County; Swansea City; Cambridge United
- Matches: 462
- Goals: 1,233 (2.67 per match)
- Top goalscorer: Kerry Dixon (28 goals)

Pos	Team	Pld	W	D	L	GF	GA	GD	Pts	Relegation
1	Chelsea (C, P)	42	25	13	4	90	40	+50	88	Promotion to the First Division
2	Sheffield Wednesday (P)	42	26	10	6	72	34	+38	88	Promotion to the First Division
3	Newcastle United (P)	42	24	8	10	85	53	+32	80	Promotion to the First Division
4	Manchester City	42	20	10	12	66	48	+18	70	
5	Grimsby Town	42	19	13	10	60	47	+13	70	
6	Blackburn Rovers	42	17	16	9	57	46	+11	67	
7	Carlisle United	42	16	16	10	48	41	+7	64	
8	Shrewsbury Town	42	17	10	15	49	53	−4	61	
9	Brighton & Hove Albion	42	17	9	16	69	60	+9	60	
10	Leeds United	42	16	12	14	55	56	−1	60	
11	Fulham	42	15	12	15	60	53	+7	57	
12	Huddersfield Town	42	14	15	13	56	49	+7	57	
13	Charlton Athletic	42	16	9	17	53	64	−11	57	
14	Barnsley	42	15	7	20	57	53	+4	52	
15	Cardiff City	42	15	6	21	53	66	−13	51	
16	Portsmouth	42	14	7	21	73	64	+9	49	
17	Middlesbrough	42	12	13	17	41	47	−6	49	
18	Crystal Palace	42	12	11	19	42	52	−10	47	
19	Oldham Athletic	42	13	8	21	47	73	−26	47	
20	Derby County (R)	42	11	9	22	36	72	−36	42	Relegation to the Third Division
21	Swansea City (R)	42	7	8	27	36	85	−49	29	Relegation to the Third Division
22	Cambridge United (R)	42	4	12	26	28	77	−49	24	Relegation to the Third Division

Rules for classification: 1) Points; 2) Goal difference; 3) Goals scored
(C) Champions; (P) Promoted; (R) Relegated

=== Results ===
Home \ Away	BAR	BLB	B&HA	CAM	CAR	CRL	CHA	CHE	CRY	DER	FUL	GRI	HUD	LEE	MCI	MID	NEW	OLD	POR	SHW	SHR	SWA
Barnsley		0–0	3–1	2–0	2–3	2–1	2–0	0–0	1–1	5–1	3–0	3–1	2–2	0–2	1–1	0–2	1–1	0–1	0–3	0–1	3–0	3–2
Blackburn Rovers	1–1		2–2	1–0	1–1	4–1	1–1	0–0	2–1	5–1	0–1	1–1	2–2	1–1	2–1	1–0	1–1	3–1	2–1	0–0	1–1	4–1
Brighton & Hove Albion	1–0	1–1		3–0	3–1	1–1	7–0	1–2	3–1	1–0	1–1	2–0	3–1	3–0	1–1	3–0	0–1	4–0	0–1	1–3	2–2	1–1
Cambridge United	0–3	2–0	3–4		0–2	0–2	2–2	0–1	1–3	0–1	1–1	2–2	0–3	2–2	0–0	0–0	1–0	2–1	1–3	1–2	1–0	1–1
Cardiff City	0–3	0–1	2–2	5–0		2–0	2–1	3–3	0–2	1–0	0–4	3–1	3–1	0–1	2–1	2–1	0–2	2–0	0–0	0–2	2–0	3–2
Carlisle United	4–2	0–1	1–2	0–0	1–1		3–0	0–0	2–2	2–1	2–0	1–1	0–0	1–0	2–0	1–1	3–1	2–0	0–0	1–1	1–0	2–0
Charlton Athletic	3–2	2–0	2–0	5–2	2–0	1–0		1–1	1–0	1–0	3–4	3–3	1–2	2–0	1–0	2–0	1–3	2–1	2–1	1–1	2–4	2–2
Chelsea	3–1	2–1	1–0	2–1	2–0	0–0	3–2		2–2	5–0	4–0	2–3	3–1	5–0	0–1	0–0	4–0	3–0	2–2	3–2	3–0	6–1
Crystal Palace	0–1	0–2	0–2	1–1	1–0	1–2	2–0	0–1		0–1	1–1	0–1	0–0	0–0	0–2	1–0	3–1	2–1	2–1	1–0	1–1	2–0
Derby County	0–2	1–1	0–3	1–0	2–3	1–4	0–1	1–2	3–0		1–0	1–2	1–1	1–1	1–0	1–0	3–2	2–2	2–0	1–1	1–0	2–1
Fulham	1–0	0–1	3–1	1–0	0–2	0–0	0–1	3–5	1–1	2–2		1–1	0–2	2–1	5–1	2–1	2–2	3–0	0–2	1–1	3–0	5–0
Grimsby Town	1–0	3–2	5–0	0–0	1–0	1–1	2–1	0–1	2–0	2–1	2–1		2–1	2–0	1–1	0–0	1–1	3–0	3–4	1–0	1–1	3–0
Huddersfield Town	0–1	0–2	0–1	3–0	4–0	0–0	0–0	2–3	2–1	3–0	2–0	0–0		2–2	1–3	2–2	2–2	0–1	2–1	0–1	1–0	1–0
Leeds United	1–2	1–0	3–2	3–1	1–0	3–0	1–0	1–1	1–1	0–0	1–0	2–1	1–2		1–2	4–1	0–1	2–0	2–1	1–1	3–0	1–0
Manchester City	3–2	6–0	4–0	5–0	2–1	3–1	0–1	0–2	3–1	1–1	0–0	2–1	2–3	1–1		2–1	1–2	2–0	2–1	1–2	1–0	2–1
Middlesbrough	2–1	1–2	0–0	1–1	2–0	0–1	1–0	2–1	1–3	0–0	0–2	1–1	0–0	2–2	0–0		3–2	3–2	0–0	2–0	4–0	1–0
Newcastle United	1–0	1–1	3–1	2–1	3–1	5–1	2–1	1–1	3–1	4–0	3–2	0–1	5–2	1–0	5–0	3–1		3–0	4–2	0–1	0–1	2–0
Oldham Athletic	1–0	0–0	1–0	0–0	2–1	2–3	0–0	1–1	3–2	3–0	3–0	2–1	0–3	3–2	2–2	2–1	1–2		3–2	1–3	0–1	3–3
Portsmouth	2–1	2–4	5–1	5–0	1–1	0–1	4–0	2–2	0–1	3–0	1–4	4–0	1–1	2–3	1–2	0–1	1–4	3–4		0–1	4–1	5–0
Sheffield Wednesday	2–0	4–2	2–1	1–0	5–2	2–0	4–1	2–1	1–0	3–1	1–1	1–0	0–0	3–1	0–0	0–2	4–2	3–0	2–0		1–1	6–1
Shrewsbury Town	3–2	1–0	2–1	1–0	1–0	0–0	1–1	2–4	1–1	3–0	0–0	1–2	1–0	5–1	1–3	1–0	2–2	2–0	2–0	2–1		2–0
Swansea City	1–0	0–1	1–3	2–1	3–2	0–0	1–0	1–3	1–0	2–0	0–3	0–1	2–2	2–2	0–2	2–1	1–2	0–0	1–2	0–1	0–2	

Legend: Blue = home team win; Yellow = draw; Red = away team win.

=== Second Division maps ===
Locations of the Football League Second Division London teams 1983–1984
Locations of the Football League Second Division 1983–1984 teams

== Third Division ==
Football League Third Division
- Season: 1983–84
- Champions: Oxford United (2nd title)
- Promoted: Sheffield United; Wimbledon
- Relegated: Exeter City; Port Vale; Scunthorpe United; Southend United
- Matches: 552
- Goals: 1,586 (2.87 per match)
- Top goalscorer: Keith Edwards (Sheffield United), 33

Pos	Team	Pld	W	D	L	GF	GA	GD	Pts	Promotion or relegation
1	Oxford United (C, P)	46	28	11	7	91	50	+41	95	Promotion to the Second Division
2	Wimbledon (P)	46	26	9	11	97	76	+21	87	Promotion to the Second Division
3	Sheffield United (P)	46	24	11	11	86	53	+33	83	Promotion to the Second Division
4	Hull City	46	23	14	9	71	38	+33	83	
5	Bristol Rovers	46	22	13	11	68	54	+14	79	
6	Walsall	46	22	9	15	68	61	+7	75	
7	Bradford City	46	20	11	15	73	65	+8	71	
8	Gillingham	46	20	10	16	74	69	+5	70	
9	Millwall	46	18	13	15	71	65	+6	67	
10	Bolton Wanderers	46	18	10	18	56	60	−4	64	
11	Orient	46	18	9	19	71	81	−10	63	
12	Burnley	46	16	14	16	76	61	+15	62	
13	Newport County	46	16	14	16	58	75	−17	62	
14	Lincoln City	46	17	10	19	59	62	−3	61	
15	Wigan Athletic	46	16	13	17	46	56	−10	61	
16	Preston North End	46	15	11	20	66	66	0	56	
17	Bournemouth	46	16	7	23	63	73	−10	55	
18	Rotherham United	46	15	9	22	57	64	−7	54	
19	Plymouth Argyle	46	13	12	21	56	62	−6	51	
20	Brentford	46	11	16	19	69	79	−10	49	
21	Scunthorpe United (R)	46	9	19	18	54	73	−19	46	Relegation to the Fourth Division
22	Southend United (R)	46	10	14	22	55	76	−21	44	Relegation to the Fourth Division
23	Port Vale (R)	46	11	10	25	51	83	−32	43	Relegation to the Fourth Division
24	Exeter City (R)	46	6	15	25	50	84	−34	33	Relegation to the Fourth Division

(C) Champions; (P) Promoted; (R) Relegated

=== Results ===
Home \ Away	BOL	BOU	BRA	BRE	BRR	BUR	EXE	GIL	HUL	LIN	MIL	NPC	ORI	OXF	PLY	PTV	PNE	ROT	SCU	SHU	STD	WAL	WIG	WDN
Bolton Wanderers		0–1	0–2	1–0	3–0	0–0	1–0	0–1	0–0	0–2	2–0	2–3	3–2	1–0	2–1	2–0	2–2	2–0	0–0	3–1	2–0	8–1	0–1	2–0
Bournemouth	2–2		4–1	0–3	0–1	1–0	3–1	2–0	2–3	3–0	1–1	1–1	3–2	2–1	2–1	1–1	0–1	4–2	1–1	0–1	1–0	3–0	0–1	2–3
Bradford City	0–2	5–2		1–1	0–1	2–1	1–3	3–2	0–0	0–0	3–3	1–0	4–1	2–2	2–0	2–2	3–2	1–0	2–2	2–1	1–1	0–0	6–2	5–2
Brentford	3–0	1–1	1–4		2–2	0–0	3–0	2–3	1–1	3–0	2–2	2–0	1–1	1–2	2–2	3–1	4–1	2–1	3–0	1–3	0–0	1–1	0–1	3–4
Bristol Rovers	2–1	1–3	1–0	3–1		2–1	2–0	3–0	1–3	3–1	3–2	4–0	0–0	1–1	2–0	0–0	3–1	2–0	4–1	1–1	2–1	4–2	2–1	1–1
Burnley	2–2	5–1	2–1	2–2	0–0		4–0	2–3	0–2	4–0	1–0	2–0	2–3	1–1	2–1	7–0	2–1	2–2	5–0	2–1	3–0	0–2	3–0	0–2
Exeter City	2–2	0–2	0–2	1–2	1–2	1–1		0–0	2–1	0–3	3–2	1–2	3–4	3–1	1–1	1–1	2–1	0–1	1–1	1–2	3–3	0–1	1–1	0–3
Gillingham	2–0	2–1	0–0	4–2	1–2	0–1	3–1		1–2	2–0	3–3	4–1	3–1	2–3	2–1	1–1	2–0	4–2	1–1	4–2	5–1	1–3	3–0	0–1
Hull City	1–1	3–1	1–0	2–0	0–0	4–1	1–0	0–0		2–0	5–0	0–0	2–1	0–1	1–2	1–0	3–0	5–0	1–0	4–1	2–1	2–2	1–0	1–0
Lincoln City	0–0	3–0	2–3	2–0	4–0	3–1	1–1	4–0	1–3		2–2	2–3	3–1	2–2	2–0	3–2	2–1	0–1	2–1	0–2	1–2	2–1	0–1	1–2
Millwall	3–0	3–1	0–0	1–2	1–0	2–0	3–0	2–2	1–0	0–2		1–1	4–3	2–1	1–0	3–2	1–0	2–0	2–1	1–2	4–0	2–0	2–0	1–1
Newport County	2–3	2–1	4–3	1–1	2–1	1–0	1–0	1–0	1–1	1–0	1–1		0–0	1–1	2–0	2–1	1–1	1–4	1–1	0–2	1–1	3–1	5–3	1–1
Orient	2–1	2–0	2–0	2–0	0–1	1–2	2–2	1–1	3–1	1–1	5–3	2–2		1–2	3–2	3–0	2–1	2–1	1–0	2–0	1–0	0–1	0–0	2–6
Oxford United	5–0	3–2	2–0	2–1	3–2	2–2	1–1	0–1	1–1	3–0	4–2	2–0	5–2		5–0	2–0	2–0	3–2	1–0	2–2	2–1	6–3	0–0	2–0
Plymouth Argyle	2–0	1–0	3–0	1–0	1–1	1–1	2–2	1–1	2–0	2–2	0–1	0–1	3–1	2–1		3–0	1–0	1–1	4–0	0–1	4–0	3–1	0–0	1–2
Port Vale	1–2	2–1	1–2	4–3	2–0	2–3	2–2	0–1	1–0	0–1	1–0	4–2	2–0	1–3	0–1		1–1	2–3	0–0	2–0	2–1	0–2	1–1	2–0
Preston North End	2–1	2–0	1–2	3–3	1–0	4–2	2–1	2–2	0–0	1–2	0–0	2–0	3–1	1–2	2–1	4–0		1–0	1–0	2–2	4–1	0–1	2–3	2–3
Rotherham United	1–1	1–0	1–0	4–0	2–2	1–1	1–0	3–0	0–1	1–1	1–0	0–1	0–1	1–2	2–0	2–1	0–1		3–0	0–1	0–0	0–1	4–1	1–2
Scunthorpe United	1–0	1–2	2–1	4–4	2–2	4–0	3–1	2–0	2–0	0–0	0–1	3–3	3–1	0–0	3–0	1–1	1–5	1–2		1–1	1–6	0–0	0–0	5–1
Sheffield United	5–0	2–0	2–0	0–0	4–0	0–0	2–2	4–0	2–2	0–0	2–0	2–0	6–3	1–2	2–0	3–1	1–1	3–0	5–3		5–0	2–0	2–2	1–2
Southend United	0–1	0–0	2–1	6–0	1–2	2–2	0–3	3–1	2–2	2–0	3–2	3–1	3–0	0–1	1–1	1–2	1–1	2–2	0–0	0–1		0–0	1–0	1–1
Walsall	1–0	3–1	1–2	1–0	2–1	1–1	4–1	3–1	2–1	0–1	1–1	3–2	0–1	0–1	3–2	2–0	2–1	2–2	1–1	1–2	4–0		3–0	4–0
Wigan Athletic	0–1	1–3	0–1	2–1	0–0	1–0	1–1	1–2	1–1	2–0	0–0	1–0	0–1	0–2	1–1	3–0	1–0	2–1	2–0	3–0	0–1	0–1		3–2
Wimbledon	4–0	3–2	4–1	2–1	1–1	1–4	2–1	1–3	1–4	3–1	4–3	6–0	2–2	3–1	1–0	4–2	2–2	3–1	1–1	3–1	3–2	2–0	2–2	

Legend: Blue = home team win; Yellow = draw; Red = away team win.

- On the 27th of December 1983, Wimbledon were leading Millwall 4-2 when Wimbledon full-back Wally Downes took a direct free-kick and chipped the ball over goalkeeper Dave Beasant and into the net. As Beasant had not touched the ball, Law 13 states that the goal should have been disallowed and Millwall awarded a corner kick. Instead referee John E Martin incorrectly awarded the goal. Wimbledon hung on to win 4-3.

=== Third Division maps ===
Locations of the Football League Third Division London teams 1983–1984
Locations of the Football League Third Division teams 1983–1984

== Fourth Division ==
Football LeagueFourth Division
- Season: 1983–84
- Champions: York City (1st title)
- Promoted: Bristol City; Doncaster Rovers; Reading
- Failed re-election: None
- Matches: 552
- Goals: 1,505 (2.73 per match)
- Top goalscorer: Trevor Senior (Reading), 36

Pos	Team	Pld	W	D	L	GF	GA	GD	Pts	Promotion or qualification
1	York City (C, P)	46	31	8	7	96	39	+57	101	Promotion to the Third Division
2	Doncaster Rovers (P)	46	24	13	9	82	54	+28	85	Promotion to the Third Division
3	Reading (P)	46	22	16	8	84	56	+28	82	Promotion to the Third Division
4	Bristol City (P)	46	24	10	12	70	44	+26	82	Promotion to the Third Division
5	Aldershot	46	22	9	15	76	69	+7	75	
6	Blackpool	46	21	9	16	70	52	+18	72	
7	Peterborough United	46	18	14	14	72	48	+24	68	
8	Colchester United	46	17	16	13	69	53	+16	67	
9	Torquay United	46	18	13	15	59	64	−5	67	
10	Tranmere Rovers	46	17	15	14	53	53	0	66	
11	Hereford United	46	16	15	15	54	53	+1	63	
12	Stockport County	46	17	11	18	60	64	−4	62	
13	Chesterfield	46	15	15	16	59	61	−2	60	
14	Darlington	46	17	8	21	49	50	−1	59	
15	Bury	46	15	14	17	61	64	−3	59	
16	Crewe Alexandra	46	16	11	19	56	67	−11	59	
17	Swindon Town	46	15	13	18	58	56	+2	58	
18	Northampton Town	46	13	14	19	53	78	−25	53	
19	Mansfield Town	46	13	13	20	66	70	−4	52	
20	Wrexham	46	11	15	20	59	74	−15	48	Qualification for the European Cup Winners' Cup first round (Note: Wrexham lost the Welsh Cup final to Shrewsbury Town, but since Shrewsbury are an English side, Wrexham went on to represent Wales in the European Cup Winners' Cup.)
21	Halifax Town	46	12	12	22	55	89	−34	48	Re-elected
22	Rochdale	46	11	13	22	52	80	−28	46	Re-elected
23	Hartlepool United	46	10	10	26	47	85	−38	40	Re-elected
24	Chester City	46	7	13	26	45	82	−37	34	Re-elected

(C) Champions; (P) Promoted

=== Results ===
Home \ Away	ALD	BLP	BRI	BRY	CHE	CHF	COL	CRE	DAR	DON	HAL	HAR	HER	MAN	NOR	PET	REA	ROC	STP	SWI	TOR	TRA	WRE	YOR
Aldershot		3–2	1–0	1–2	5–2	2–1	5–1	0–0	0–0	2–1	5–2	2–1	1–4	7–1	1–0	3–2	0–0	2–1	1–1	2–1	3–1	1–1	1–1	1–4
Blackpool	5–0		1–0	1–1	3–3	1–0	3–2	3–0	3–1	3–1	4–0	1–0	3–1	2–0	2–3	1–2	1–0	0–2	1–1	1–1	1–0	0–1	4–0	3–0
Bristol City	2–1	1–1		3–2	4–2	2–0	4–1	2–1	1–0	1–2	3–0	2–0	1–0	4–0	4–1	0–1	3–1	1–1	3–1	1–0	5–0	1–1	2–1	1–0
Bury	0–3	0–0	2–1		2–1	2–0	1–1	1–1	0–3	2–3	3–0	3–0	1–4	2–2	1–2	2–2	2–3	3–1	2–1	2–1	0–0	0–0	2–0	1–3
Chester City	1–2	0–2	1–2	2–1		0–2	1–4	0–1	2–1	1–0	1–1	4–1	0–1	0–4	1–1	1–1	2–1	1–0	2–4	0–3	1–2	0–0	1–0	1–1
Chesterfield	3–1	1–1	1–1	1–5	1–1		1–1	1–3	1–1	0–0	0–0	4–1	0–0	0–0	2–1	1–0	2–1	3–0	2–0	1–0	3–2	3–3	1–1	2–1
Colchester United	4–1	2–1	0–0	1–0	1–0	2–0		2–0	2–1	1–1	4–1	6–0	3–0	1–0	2–2	1–1	3–0	4–0	1–1	0–0	3–0	0–1	1–1	1–3
Crewe Alexandra	0–0	2–1	2–2	2–1	1–1	2–1	1–1		2–1	1–1	6–1	2–0	1–1	1–3	3–2	0–1	1–1	0–1	0–3	2–0	2–1	3–0	1–1	0–3
Darlington	0–1	2–0	0–1	1–2	2–1	2–1	0–2	2–0		1–2	3–2	2–0	0–0	3–0	5–3	1–0	1–1	1–0	1–0	1–0	0–1	1–0	2–2	0–0
Doncaster Rovers	3–1	2–1	1–0	3–1	1–0	2–1	3–3	1–0	3–2		3–2	0–1	3–0	3–1	1–0	1–1	2–3	3–0	2–1	3–0	1–1	1–1	3–0	2–2
Halifax Town	1–0	1–0	1–2	0–0	2–2	2–1	4–1	1–0	0–2	1–2		3–2	2–1	0–0	2–2	2–1	0–1	5–0	2–0	2–1	2–2	1–2	1–1	1–2
Hartlepool United	0–1	0–1	2–2	1–3	1–1	2–2	0–0	2–1	2–1	1–0	3–0		0–0	4–1	2–0	1–1	3–3	1–2	1–2	0–1	2–1	0–1	1–1	2–3
Hereford United	2–1	1–2	0–2	1–2	2–1	3–1	1–1	0–1	1–0	0–3	0–0	5–0		0–0	0–0	2–1	1–1	2–1	2–0	2–1	1–1	0–1	3–0	2–1
Mansfield Town	5–2	1–1	0–1	1–1	3–1	0–1	0–0	3–3	1–0	1–2	7–1	5–0	1–1		3–1	0–0	2–0	3–0	1–2	2–2	1–3	1–0	3–4	0–1
Northampton Town	1–4	1–5	1–0	1–0	2–1	1–1	3–1	2–0	2–0	1–4	1–1	1–1	0–3	2–1		2–1	2–2	1–1	0–0	2–0	2–1	0–0	3–3	1–2
Peterborough United	1–2	4–0	4–1	2–1	1–0	2–0	2–0	1–0	2–2	1–1	4–0	3–1	1–1	3–0	6–0		3–3	2–0	2–0	1–1	5–0	2–0	0–1	0–2
Reading	1–0	2–0	2–0	1–1	1–0	1–1	1–0	5–0	1–0	3–2	1–0	5–1	3–1	4–0	3–0	1–1		0–0	6–2	2–2	2–2	1–0	4–1	1–0
Rochdale	3–1	1–0	0–1	0–2	1–1	2–4	0–0	1–0	2–0	3–3	1–1	2–0	3–3	0–0	1–1	2–1	4–1		2–2	3–3	1–0	2–3	1–2	0–2
Stockport County	2–2	1–2	0–0	1–1	2–1	2–0	2–0	2–3	2–0	0–2	4–0	1–0	1–0	0–4	1–0	4–1	3–0	2–1		1–3	2–1	2–1	1–1	0–2
Swindon Town	0–2	0–0	1–1	0–0	4–0	1–2	2–1	1–0	1–0	2–1	2–3	3–2	3–0	1–1	0–0	2–0	1–1	2–1	2–1		2–3	1–1	0–1	3–2
Torquay United	0–1	1–0	1–1	2–0	1–0	1–1	2–1	3–1	0–1	4–1	1–1	0–0	1–1	1–0	2–1	1–0	2–2	4–2	1–1	1–0		1–1	1–1	1–3
Tranmere Rovers	3–0	3–2	2–0	1–1	2–2	0–3	2–1	2–3	0–1	1–1	3–2	0–1	0–1	1–0	1–0	0–0	2–3	2–2	1–0	2–1	3–0		2–1	0–1
Wrexham	1–1	0–1	3–1	3–0	2–0	4–2	0–2	0–1	1–1	1–2	1–0	1–4	0–0	2–3	0–1	2–2	0–3	5–1	1–2	0–3	2–2	5–1		0–0
York City	2–0	4–0	1–1	3–0	4–1	1–0	3–0	5–2	2–0	1–1	4–1	2–0	4–0	2–1	3–0	2–0	2–2	2–0	3–1	2–0	2–3	1–1	3–2	

Legend: Blue = home team win; Yellow = draw; Red = away team win.

=== Fourth Division maps ===
Locations of the Football League Fourth Division teams 1983–1984

== Election/Re-election to the Football League ==
As champions of the Alliance Premier League, Maidstone United won for the second time the right to apply for election to the Football League, to replace one of the four bottom teams in the 1983–84 Football League Fourth Division. The vote went as follows:

Club	Final Position	Votes
Chester City	24th (Fourth Division)	52
Halifax Town	21st (Fourth Division)	52
Rochdale	22nd (Fourth Division)	50
Hartlepool United	23rd (Fourth Division)	32
Maidstone United (1897)	1st (Alliance Premier League)	22

Hence, all four Football League teams were re-elected, and Maidstone United were again denied membership of the League.

== Attendances ==
=== Division One ===
No.	Club	Average	Highest	Lowest
1	Manchester United	42,534	56,121	33,616
2	Liverpool FC	31,974	44,622	20,746
3	Tottenham Hotspur FC	28,701	44,348	18,271
4	Arsenal FC	28,116	48,831	18,612
5	West Ham United FC	21,386	32,535	15,430
6	Aston Villa FC	21,371	39,318	13,052
7	Everton FC	19,343	51,245	13,191
8	Southampton FC	18,089	21,141	15,009
9	Nottingham Forest FC	17,698	29,692	13,625
10	Ipswich Town FC	17,464	26,562	12,884
11	Watford FC	16,510	22,486	12,843
12	Sunderland AFC	16,181	26,826	11,612
13	Norwich City FC	15,659	24,812	12,111
14	Queens Park Rangers FC	15,370	27,140	9,320
15	Leicester City FC	14,923	27,280	10,776
16	West Bromwich Albion FC	14,569	28,104	10,261
17	Birmingham City FC	14,107	23,993	9,040
18	Stoke City FC	13,900	24,372	8,435
19	Coventry City FC	12,572	21,553	8,433
20	Wolverhampton Wanderers FC	12,478	26,249	6,611
21	Luton Town FC	11,938	17,275	8,181
22	Notts County FC	9,463	18,745	5,378

=== Division Two ===
No.	Club	Average	Highest	Lowest
1	Newcastle United FC	29,811	36,288	22,573
2	Manchester City FC	25,604	41,862	19,147
3	Sheffield Wednesday FC	22,769	41,378	14,019
4	Chelsea FC	21,120	35,147	12,389
5	Leeds United FC	15,493	30,884	8,271
6	Portsmouth FC	13,196	19,852	7,359
7	Derby County FC	12,859	18,691	9,711
8	Brighton & Hove Albion FC	12,275	20,872	8,161
9	Huddersfield Town AFC	11,044	25,101	5,599
10	Barnsley FC	9,738	20,322	4,672
11	Middlesbrough FC	8,474	19,807	4,720
12	Crystal Palace FC	8,199	20,450	5,008
13	Fulham FC	8,143	24,687	4,194
14	Grimsby Town FC	7,643	16,197	4,825
15	Blackburn Rovers FC	7,623	19,199	3,107
16	Cardiff City FC	7,067	14,580	3,870
17	Swansea City AFC	6,980	10,990	3,632
18	Charlton Athletic FC	6,732	15,298	3,786
19	Oldham Athletic FC	6,036	20,320	3,428
20	Carlisle United FC	5,611	15,871	3,048
21	Shrewsbury Town FC	4,740	9,471	2,457
22	Cambridge United FC	4,071	10,602	2,203

=== Division Three ===
No.	Club	Average	Highest	Lowest
1	Sheffield United FC	12,881	22,850	8,984
2	Hull City AFC	8,135	15,461	5,572
3	Oxford United FC	7,871	13,041	4,393
4	Burnley FC	6,625	12,327	3,301
5	Bolton Wanderers FC	5,892	11,059	3,045
6	Bristol Rovers FC	5,550	7,568	3,254
7	Plymouth Argyle FC	5,336	10,387	2,990
8	Walsall FC	5,017	10,163	2,546
9	Brentford FC	4,735	8,042	3,391
10	Rotherham United FC	4,645	14,177	3,141
11	Preston North End FC	4,571	8,813	3,146
12	Millwall FC	4,351	6,707	2,363
13	Bradford City AFC	4,203	9,310	2,555
14	AFC Bournemouth	4,039	7,220	3,045
15	Port Vale FC	4,023	7,034	2,299
16	Gillingham FC	3,916	6,226	2,273
17	Wigan Athletic FC	3,899	10,045	2,569
18	Wimbledon FC	3,459	6,043	2,007
19	Exeter City FC	3,380	6,870	1,782
20	Scunthorpe United FC	3,349	8,286	2,127
21	Leyton Orient FC	3,222	5,695	2,004
22	Lincoln City FC	3,148	6,686	1,372
23	Southend United FC	3,142	5,428	1,900
24	Newport County AFC	3,135	5,154	1,849

=== Division Four ===
No.	Club	Average	Highest	Lowest
1	Bristol City FC	7,287	12,810	5,266
2	York City FC	5,008	11,297	2,722
3	Reading FC	4,471	8,780	2,622
4	Blackpool FC	3,936	6,062	2,324
5	Doncaster Rovers FC	3,778	4,996	2,189
6	Peterborough United FC	3,424	6,527	1,679
7	Chesterfield FC	3,414	6,488	1,991
8	Swindon Town FC	3,345	6,692	1,873
9	Hereford United FC	2,984	5,943	1,878
10	Aldershot Town FC	2,483	6,270	1,349
11	Crewe Alexandra FC	2,454	4,042	1,810
12	Mansfield Town FC	2,440	6,734	1,673
13	Northampton Town FC	2,343	6,464	1,109
14	Colchester United FC	2,220	3,402	1,226
15	Tranmere Rovers	2,138	3,566	1,467
16	Bury FC	2,104	4,097	1,096
17	Stockport County FC	2,098	2,993	1,360
18	Wrexham AFC	2,083	5,756	1,016
19	Torquay United FC	1,922	4,309	1,073
20	Chester City FC	1,764	4,013	1,022
21	Darlington FC	1,507	2,574	1,091
22	Hartlepool United FC	1,505	2,968	790
23	Rochdale AFC	1,491	3,147	809
24	Halifax Town AFC	1,412	2,457	911

== See also ==
- 1983–84 in English football
