= Owen Williams =

Owen Williams may refer to:

== Politicians ==
- Owen Williams (politician, born 1764) (1764–1832), Member of Parliament for Great Marlow, 1796–1832
- Owen Williams (British Army officer) (1836–1913), British general and Member of Parliament for Great Marlow, 1880–1885

== Sportsmen ==
- Owen Williams (Australian cricketer) (1847–1917), Australian cricketer
- Owen Williams (South African cricketer) (born 1932), South African cricketer
- Owen Williams (footballer, born 1873)
- Owen Williams (footballer, born 1896) (1896–1960), English football player
- Owen Williams (rugby union, born 1986), Welsh rugby union player
- Owen Williams (rugby union, born 1991), Welsh rugby union centre
- Owen Williams (rugby union, born 1992), Welsh rugby union fly-half
- Owen Williams (tennis) (1931–2026), South African tennis player

== Others ==
- Owen Williams (engineer) (1890–1969), English civil engineer
- Owen Williams (Owen Gwyrfai) (1790–1874), Welsh antiquary and author
- R. Owen Williams, Transylvania University president
