= William Neale =

William or Bill Neale may refer to:

- Bill Neale (born 1943), Canadian former figure skater
- Billy Neale (cricketer) (1904–1955), English professional cricketer
- Billy Neale (1933–2001), English footballer (Darlington)
- William Neale (footballer) (1872–1901), English footballer (West Bromwich Albion)
- William Johnson Neale (1812–1893), English barrister and novelist
- Sir William Neale, 1st Baronet, of the Neale baronets

== See also ==
- William Neale Lockington (1840–1902), English zoologist
- William Neal (disambiguation)
- William Neill (disambiguation)
