= Harry Hadley =

English footballer and manager

Personal information
- Date of birth: 26 October 1877
- Place of birth: Barrow-in-Furness, England
- Date of death: 22 October 1947 (aged 69)
- Place of death: Kingston-upon-Thames, England
- Height: 5 ft 8 in (1.73 m)
- Position: Wing half

Youth career
- Colley Gate United

Senior career*
Years	Team	Apps	(Gls)
1895–1896	Halesowen		
1897–1905	West Bromwich Albion	167	(2)
1905–1906	Aston Villa	11	(0)
1906–1907	Nottingham Forest	12	(1)
1907–1908	Southampton	29	(0)
1908–1910	Croydon Common	21	(1)
1910–19??	Halesowen		
1919	Merthyr Town		

International career
1903	England	1	(0)

Managerial career
- 1919–1922: Merthyr Town
- 1922: Chesterfield
- 1927–1928: Aberdare Athletic
- 1928: Merthyr Town
- 1930–1931: Merthyr Town
- 1935–1936: Bangor City
- * Club domestic league appearances and goals

Harry Hadley (26 October 1877 – 22 October 1947) was an English professional football player and manager. He played once for the England national team.

== Playing career ==
Hadley was born in Barrow-in-Furness. Having had little junior football experience, he joined Halesowen in 1895 from Colley Gate United. In February 1897 he joined West Bromwich Albion where he established himself at wing-half. He won a Second Division title medal with the Baggies in 1902 and in February 1903 won his only England cap in the 4–0 win against Ireland at Molineux.

During a match against Aston Villa in September 1904, Hadley sustained a severe injury which put "grave doubt" on his ability to play again, following comments by a club director.

Having been retained at West Brom by club directors at great sacrifice, in February 1905, after 167 league games, he left the club to join Aston Villa for a fee of £250, but played just 11 times before joining Nottingham Forest in April 1906. A year later he moved again, this time to Southern League club Southampton. According to Holley & Chalk's "The Alphabet of the Saints" he was "a methodical yet energetic half-back, dedicated to looking after the forwards by supporting, feeding and directing them into advantageous positions".

At the end of the 1907–08 season he moved to Croydon Common, rejoining Halesowen in February 1910. He finished his playing career with Merthyr Town.

== Managerial career ==
Hadley's first managerial job was with Merthyr Town where he was appointed in May 1919. He oversaw their promotion to the Football League in 1920 and guided them to 8th place in Division Three (South) in their first season. He left Merthyr in April 1922 to manage Chesterfield, but left in August the same year.

In 1924, he was named the secretary of Accrington Stanley.

In November 1927 he took over at Aberdare Athletic, who had failed to gain re-election to the Football League the previous season. He left in April 1928, returning to Merthyr Town as manager, but left again in November the same year. He began a third spell as Merthyr manager in 1930, leaving in September 1931.

His final managerial job was with Bangor City who he joined in July 1935 and left in April 1936 when he retired.

Hadley's brother Ben also played professionally for West Bromwich Albion, but had left before Harry's arrival at the Hawthorns.

== Honours ==
=== As a player ===
West Bromwich Albion

- Football League Second Division: 1901–02
