= William Neal (disambiguation) =

William Neal (born 1947) is an English artist.

William or Bill Neal may also refer to:

- Sir William Neal, 1st Baronet (1860–1942), British businessman and Lord Mayor of London
- William Keith Neal (1905–1990), English antique firearms collector
- Will E. Neal (1875–1959), American politician
- William H. Neal (1915–1974), American politician
- Bill Neal (American football) (1931–2024), American football coach
- Bill Neal (chef) (1950–1991), American chef and restaurateur
- Bill Neal (pediatric cardiologist) (1940–2021), American pediatric cardiologist
- Bill Neal (writer) (1936–2021), American defense attorney, historian and non-fiction writer

== See also ==
- William Neale (disambiguation)
- William Neill (disambiguation)
