= Tony McShane =

Northern Irish footballer and manager

Personal information
- Date of birth: 28 February 1927
- Place of birth: Belfast, Northern Ireland
- Date of death: 24 December 2012 (aged 85)
- Position: Wing half

Senior career*
Years	Team	Apps	(Gls)
- Brantwood
1949–1955	Plymouth Argyle	85	(2)
1955–1957	Swindon Town	41	(0)
- Goole Town
Total		126	(2)

Managerial career
- 1957–1958: Goole Town
- 1958–1959: Scunthorpe United
- 1962–1967: Chesterfield
- * Club domestic league appearances and goals

Anthony McShane (28 February 1927 – 24 December 2012) was a Northern Irish footballer and manager who played in the Football League for Plymouth Argyle and Swindon Town. After his playing career, McShane had spells as manager of Scunthorpe United and Chesterfield.
