= William Neill =

William Neill may refer to:

- William Neill (poet) (1922–2010), Scottish poet
- William Neill (rugby league) (1884–1964), Australian rugby league footballer of the early 20th century
- William Neill, birth name of Bud Neill (1911–1970), Scottish cartoonist of the mid 20th century
- William Neill (politician) (1889–1960), MP for Belfast North
- Bill Neill (born 1959), American football defensive lineman
- Billy Neill (1929–1997), Irish footballer
- Bill Neil (visual effects artist), American visual effects artist
- William Neill (priest) (born 1930), Archdeacon of Dromore

== See also ==
- Billy Neil (footballer, born 1939) (1939–2014), Scottish football centre-half who represented Great Britain at the 1960 Olympics
- Billy Neil (footballer, born 1944), Scottish football winger for Millwall
- William Neal (disambiguation)
- William Neale (disambiguation)
- William Neile (1637–1670), English mathematician
- Will E. Neal (1875–1959), physician and politician
- William Neel (died 1418), MP
- Willie Neil (fl. 1920s), Scottish footballer with Airdrieonians
- William O'Neill (disambiguation)
