= 1984–85 Football League =

86th season of the Football League

The Football League
- Season: 1984–85
- Champions: Everton

The 1984–85 season was the 86th completed season of The Football League.

== Final league tables and results ==
The tables and results below are reproduced here in the exact form that they can be found at The Rec.Sport.Soccer Statistics Foundation website, with home and away statistics separated.

During the first five seasons of the league, that is, until the season 1893–94, re-election process concerned the clubs which finished in the bottom four of the league. From the 1894–95 season and until the 1920–21 season the re-election process was required of the clubs which finished in the bottom three of the league. From the 1922–23 season on it was required of the bottom two teams of both Third Division North and Third Division South. Since the Fourth Division was established in the 1958–59 season, the re-election process has concerned the bottom four clubs in that division.

== First Division ==
First Division
- Season: 1984–85
- Champions: Everton; 8th English title
- Relegated: Norwich City; Sunderland; Stoke City
- Matches: 462
- Goals: 1,288 (2.79 per match)
- Top goalscorer: Gary Lineker; Kerry Dixon (24 goals each)
- Biggest home win: Chelsea 6–2 Coventry City (3 November 1984)
- Biggest away win: Aston Villa 0–5 Nottingham Forest (5 September 1984)
- Highest scoring: Queens Park Rangers 5–5 Newcastle United (22 September 1984)
- Longest winning run: 10 matches Everton
- Longest unbeaten run: 18 matches Everton
- Longest losing run: 10 matches Stoke City

Howard Kendall's Everton side beat neighbours Liverpool to the league championship by thirteen points with five games to spare, while Tottenham Hotspur and Manchester United followed closely behind. Kendall's team also collected the Cup Winners' Cup. Southampton completed the top five, but long-serving manager Lawrie McMenemy then delivered a major surprise by resigning as manager to take over at relegated Sunderland.

The season marked the return of Sheffield Wednesday to the First Division after 14 years away, Newcastle United after six years away, and Chelsea after five years. All three sides secured First Division survival comfortably.

Stoke City finished bottom of the First Division with just three league wins all season and just 17 points – a record low under the 3 points for a win system in any division, which would stand for twenty-one years. Norwich City and Sunderland – the two League Cup finalists – occupied the two other relegation places.

Liverpool manager Joe Fagan retired after the season and striker Kenny Dalglish was appointed player-manager.

The First Division's leading scorers this season were Gary Lineker at Leicester City and Kerry Dixon at Chelsea, with both players scoring 24 league goals.

=== Final table ===
Pos	Team	Pld	W	D	L	GF	GA	GD	Pts	Qualification or relegation
1	Everton (C)	42	28	6	8	88	43	+45	90	Qualified for the Football League Super Cup and disqualified from the European Cup
2	Liverpool	42	22	11	9	68	35	+33	77	Qualified for the Football League Super Cup and disqualified from the UEFA Cup
3	Tottenham Hotspur	42	23	8	11	78	51	+27	77	Qualified for the Football League Super Cup and disqualified from the UEFA Cup
4	Manchester United (Note: Manchester United would have qualified for the Cup Winners' Cup as FA Cup winners.)	42	22	10	10	77	47	+30	76	Qualified for the Football League Super Cup and disqualified from the European Cup Winners' Cup
5	Southampton	42	19	11	12	56	47	+9	68	Qualified for the Football League Super Cup and disqualified from the UEFA Cup
6	Chelsea	42	18	12	12	63	48	+15	66	
7	Arsenal	42	19	9	14	61	49	+12	66	
8	Sheffield Wednesday	42	17	14	11	58	45	+13	65	
9	Nottingham Forest	42	19	7	16	56	48	+8	64	
10	Aston Villa	42	15	11	16	60	60	0	56	
11	Watford	42	14	13	15	81	71	+10	55	
12	West Bromwich Albion	42	16	7	19	58	62	−4	55	
13	Luton Town	42	15	9	18	57	61	−4	54	
14	Newcastle United	42	13	13	16	55	70	−15	52	
15	Leicester City	42	15	6	21	65	73	−8	51	
16	West Ham United	42	13	12	17	51	68	−17	51	
17	Ipswich Town	42	13	11	18	46	57	−11	50	
18	Coventry City	42	15	5	22	47	64	−17	50	
19	Queens Park Rangers	42	13	11	18	53	72	−19	50	
20	Norwich City (Note: Norwich City would have qualified for the UEFA Cup as League Cup winners.) (R)	42	13	10	19	46	64	−18	49	Qualified for the Football League Super Cup and disqualified from the UEFA Cup and relegated to the Second Division
21	Sunderland (R)	42	10	10	22	40	62	−22	40	Relegation to the Second Division
22	Stoke City (R)	42	3	8	31	24	91	−67	17	Relegation to the Second Division

Source: World Football
Rules for classification: 1) Points; 2) Goal difference; 3) Goals scored
(C) Champions; (R) Relegated

=== First Division results ===
Home \ Away	ARS	AST	CHE	COV	EVE	IPS	LEI	LIV	LUT	MUN	NEW	NOR	NOT	QPR	SHW	SOU	STK	SUN	TOT	WAT	WBA	WHU
Arsenal		1–1	1–1	2–1	1–0	1–1	2–0	3–1	3–1	0–1	2–0	2–0	1–1	1–0	1–0	1–0	4–0	3–2	1–2	1–1	4–0	2–1
Aston Villa	0–0		4–2	1–0	1–1	2–1	0–1	0–0	0–1	3–0	4–0	2–2	0–5	5–2	3–0	2–2	2–0	1–0	0–1	1–1	3–1	0–0
Chelsea	1–1	3–1		6–2	0–1	2–0	3–0	3–1	2–0	1–3	1–0	1–2	1–0	1–0	2–1	0–2	1–1	1–0	1–1	2–3	3–1	3–0
Coventry City	1–2	0–3	1–0		4–1	1–0	2–0	0–2	1–0	0–3	1–1	0–0	1–3	3–0	1–0	2–1	4–0	0–1	1–1	3–1	2–1	1–2
Everton	2–0	2–1	3–4	2–1		1–1	3–0	1–0	2–1	5–0	4–0	3–0	5–0	2–0	1–1	2–2	4–0	4–1	1–4	4–0	4–1	3–0
Ipswich Town	2–1	3–0	2–0	0–0	0–2		2–0	0–0	1–1	1–1	1–1	2–0	1–0	1–1	1–2	0–1	5–1	0–2	0–3	3–3	2–0	0–1
Leicester City	1–4	5–0	1–1	5–1	1–2	2–1		0–1	2–2	2–3	2–3	2–0	1–0	4–0	3–1	1–2	0–0	2–0	1–2	1–1	2–1	1–0
Liverpool	3–0	2–1	4–3	3–1	0–1	2–0	1–2		1–0	0–1	3–1	4–0	1–0	1–1	0–2	1–1	2–0	1–1	0–1	4–3	0–0	3–0
Luton Town	3–1	1–0	0–0	2–0	2–0	3–1	4–0	1–2		2–1	2–2	3–1	1–2	2–0	1–2	1–1	2–0	2–1	2–2	3–2	1–2	2–2
Manchester United	4–2	4–0	1–1	0–1	1–1	3–0	2–1	1–1	2–0		5–0	2–0	2–0	3–0	1–2	0–0	5–0	2–2	1–0	1–1	2–0	5–1
Newcastle United	1–3	3–0	2–1	0–1	2–3	3–0	1–4	0–2	1–0	1–1		1–1	1–1	1–0	2–1	2–1	2–1	3–1	2–3	3–1	1–0	1–1
Norwich City	1–0	2–2	0–0	2–1	4–2	0–2	1–3	3–3	3–0	0–1	0–0		0–1	2–0	1–1	1–0	0–0	1–3	1–2	3–2	2–1	1–0
Nottingham Forest	2–0	3–2	2–0	2–0	1–0	2–0	2–1	0–2	3–1	3–2	0–0	3–1		2–0	0–0	2–0	1–1	3–1	1–2	1–1	1–2	1–2
Queens Park Rangers	1–0	2–0	2–2	2–1	0–0	3–0	4–3	0–2	2–3	1–3	5–5	2–2	3–0		0–0	0–4	2–0	1–0	2–2	2–0	3–1	4–2
Sheffield Wednesday	2–1	1–1	1–1	1–0	0–1	2–2	5–0	1–1	1–1	1–0	4–2	1–2	3–1	3–1		2–1	2–1	2–2	2–1	1–1	2–0	2–1
Southampton	1–0	2–0	1–0	2–1	1–2	3–0	3–1	1–1	1–0	0–0	1–0	2–1	1–0	1–1	0–3		0–0	1–0	1–0	1–2	4–3	2–3
Stoke City	2–0	1–3	0–1	0–1	0–2	0–2	2–2	0–1	0–4	2–1	0–1	2–3	1–4	0–2	2–1	1–3		2–2	0–1	1–3	0–0	2–4
Sunderland	0–0	0–4	0–2	0–0	1–2	1–2	0–4	0–3	3–0	3–2	0–0	2–1	0–2	3–0	0–0	3–1	1–0		1–0	1–1	1–1	0–1
Tottenham Hotspur	0–2	0–2	1–1	4–2	1–2	2–3	2–2	1–0	4–2	1–2	3–1	3–1	1–0	5–0	2–0	5–1	4–0	2–0		1–5	2–3	2–2
Watford	3–4	3–3	1–3	0–1	4–5	3–1	4–1	1–1	3–0	5–1	3–3	2–0	2–0	1–1	1–0	1–1	2–0	3–1	1–2		0–2	5–0
West Bromwich Albion	2–2	1–0	0–1	5–2	2–1	1–2	2–0	0–5	4–0	1–2	2–1	0–1	4–1	0–0	2–2	0–0	2–0	1–0	0–1	2–1		5–1
West Ham United	3–1	1–2	1–1	3–1	0–1	0–0	3–1	0–3	0–0	2–2	1–1	1–0	0–0	1–3	0–0	2–3	5–1	1–0	1–1	2–0	0–2	

Legend: Blue = home team win; Yellow = draw; Red = away team win.

=== Managerial changes ===
Team	Outgoing manager	Manner of departure	Date of vacancy	Position in table	Incoming manager	Date of appointment
Newcastle United	(England) Arthur Cox	Signed by Derby County	28 May 1984	Pre-season	(England) Jack Charlton	19 July 1984
Queens Park Rangers	(England) Terry Venables	Signed by Barcelona	30 May 1984	Pre-season	(England) Alan Mullery	20 June 1984
Tottenham Hotspur	(England) Keith Burkinshaw	Resigned	31 May 1984	Pre-season	(Wales) Peter Shreeves	1 June 1984
Aston Villa	(England) Tony Barton	Sacked	5 June 1984	Pre-season	(England) Graham Turner	2 July 1984
Queens Park Rangers	(England) Alan Mullery	Sacked	5 December 1984	13th	(England) Frank Sibley	5 December 1984
Coventry City	(England) Bobby Gould	Sacked	28 December 1984	21st	(Scotland) Don Mackay	28 December 1984
Stoke City	(England) Bill Asprey	Resigned	2 April 1985	22nd	(England) Tony Lacey (caretaker)	2 April 1985

=== First Division maps ===
Locations of the Football League First Division London teams 1984–1985
Locations of the Football League First Division 1984–1985 teams

== Second Division ==
Second Division
- Season: 1984–85
- Champions: Oxford United
- Promoted: Oxford United; Birmingham City; Manchester City
- Relegated: Notts County; Cardiff City; Wolverhampton Wanderers
- Matches: 462
- Goals: 1,255 (2.72 per match)
- Top goalscorer: John Aldridge (30 goals)

Jim Smith's Oxford United side won a successive promotion as Second Division champions and reached the First Division after just 23 years as Football League members. Following them into the big time were Birmingham City and Manchester City.

Slipping out of the league's second tier were Cardiff City, joined by Notts County and Wolverhampton Wanderers – both relegated for the second season in succession. Veteran manager Tommy Docherty had tried his hand at reversing financially troubled Wolves' rapid decline at Molineux, but without success.

Pos	Team	Pld	W	D	L	GF	GA	GD	Pts	Relegation
1	Oxford United (C, P)	42	25	9	8	84	36	+48	84	Promotion to the First Division
2	Birmingham City (P)	42	25	7	10	59	33	+26	82	Promotion to the First Division
3	Manchester City (P)	42	21	11	10	66	40	+26	74	Promotion to the First Division
4	Portsmouth	42	20	14	8	69	50	+19	74	
5	Blackburn Rovers	42	21	10	11	66	41	+25	73	
6	Brighton & Hove Albion	42	20	12	10	54	34	+20	72	
7	Leeds United	42	19	12	11	66	43	+23	69	
8	Shrewsbury Town	42	18	11	13	66	53	+13	65	
9	Fulham	42	19	8	15	68	64	+4	65	
10	Grimsby Town	42	18	8	16	72	64	+8	62	
11	Barnsley	42	14	16	12	42	42	0	58	
12	Wimbledon	42	16	10	16	71	75	−4	58	
13	Huddersfield Town	42	15	10	17	52	64	−12	55	
14	Oldham Athletic	42	15	8	19	49	67	−18	53	
15	Crystal Palace	42	12	12	18	46	65	−19	48	
16	Carlisle United	42	13	8	21	50	67	−17	47	
17	Charlton Athletic	42	11	12	19	51	63	−12	45	
18	Sheffield United	42	10	14	18	54	66	−12	44	
19	Middlesbrough	42	10	10	22	41	57	−16	40	
20	Notts County (R)	42	10	7	25	45	73	−28	37	Relegation to the Third Division
21	Cardiff City (R)	42	9	8	25	47	79	−32	35	Relegation to the Third Division
22	Wolverhampton Wanderers (R)	42	8	9	25	37	79	−42	33	Relegation to the Third Division

Rules for classification: 1) Points; 2) Goal difference; 3) Goals scored
(C) Champions; (P) Promoted; (R) Relegated

=== Second Division results ===
Home \ Away	BAR	BIR	BLB	B&HA	CAR	CRL	CHA	CRY	FUL	GRI	HUD	LEE	MCI	MID	NTC	OLD	OXF	POR	SHU	SHR	WDN	WOL
Barnsley		0–1	1–1	0–0	2–0	1–3	1–0	3–1	1–0	0–0	2–1	0–1	0–0	1–0	0–0	0–1	3–0	2–2	1–0	3–1	0–0	5–1
Birmingham City	0–0		0–2	1–1	2–0	2–0	2–1	3–0	2–2	2–1	1–0	1–0	0–0	3–2	2–1	0–1	0–0	0–1	4–1	0–0	4–2	1–0
Blackburn Rovers	0–0	2–1		2–0	2–1	4–0	3–0	0–1	2–1	3–1	1–3	2–1	0–1	3–0	1–0	1–1	1–1	0–1	3–1	3–1	2–0	3–0
Brighton & Hove Albion	0–0	2–0	3–1		1–0	4–1	2–1	1–0	2–0	0–0	0–1	1–1	0–0	1–2	2–1	2–0	0–0	1–1	1–0	1–0	2–1	5–1
Cardiff City	3–0	1–2	1–2	2–4		2–1	0–3	0–3	0–2	2–4	3–0	2–1	0–3	2–1	1–4	2–2	0–2	1–2	1–3	0–0	1–3	0–0
Carlisle United	2–0	2–1	0–1	0–3	0–1		1–1	1–0	3–0	1–1	0–1	2–2	0–0	0–3	1–0	2–5	0–1	3–0	1–1	2–0	6–1	0–1
Charlton Athletic	5–3	2–1	1–0	0–1	1–4	1–1		1–1	1–2	4–1	2–2	2–3	1–3	1–0	3–0	2–1	3–3	2–2	0–0	1–1	0–1	1–0
Crystal Palace	0–1	0–2	1–1	1–1	1–1	2–1	2–1		2–2	0–2	1–1	3–1	1–2	1–0	1–0	3–0	1–0	2–1	1–3	2–2	0–5	0–0
Fulham	1–1	0–1	3–2	2–0	3–2	3–2	0–0	2–2		2–1	2–1	0–2	3–2	2–1	1–0	3–1	1–0	1–3	1–0	1–2	3–1	1–2
Grimsby Town	1–0	1–0	1–1	2–4	6–3	1–0	2–1	1–3	2–4		5–1	0–2	4–1	3–1	2–0	4–1	1–2	2–3	0–2	2–1	2–1	5–1
Huddersfield Town	1–1	0–1	1–1	1–2	2–1	2–0	2–1	2–0	2–2	0–0		1–0	0–2	3–1	1–2	2–1	0–3	0–2	2–2	1–5	2–1	3–1
Leeds United	2–0	0–1	0–0	1–0	1–1	1–1	1–0	4–1	2–0	0–0	0–0		1–1	2–0	5–0	6–0	1–0	0–1	1–1	1–0	5–2	3–2
Manchester City	1–1	1–0	2–1	2–0	2–2	1–3	5–1	2–1	2–3	3–0	1–0	1–2		1–0	2–0	0–0	1–0	2–2	2–0	4–0	3–0	4–0
Middlesbrough	0–0	0–0	1–2	2–1	3–2	1–2	1–0	1–1	2–0	1–5	2–2	0–0	2–1		0–1	1–2	0–1	0–0	1–0	1–1	2–4	1–1
Notts County	0–2	1–3	0–3	1–2	0–2	3–0	0–0	0–0	2–1	1–1	0–2	1–2	3–2	3–2		0–0	2–0	1–3	0–0	1–3	2–3	4–1
Oldham Athletic	2–1	0–1	2–0	1–0	0–1	2–3	2–1	1–0	2–1	2–0	2–2	1–1	0–2	2–0	3–2		0–0	0–2	2–2	0–1	0–1	3–2
Oxford United	4–0	0–3	2–1	2–1	4–0	4–0	5–0	5–0	3–2	1–0	3–0	5–2	3–0	1–0	1–1	5–2		1–1	5–1	1–0	4–0	3–1
Portsmouth	0–0	1–3	2–2	1–1	0–0	3–1	0–1	1–1	4–4	3–2	3–2	3–1	1–2	1–0	3–1	5–1	2–1		2–1	3–0	1–0	0–1
Sheffield United	3–1	3–4	1–3	1–1	2–1	0–0	1–1	1–2	0–1	2–3	0–2	2–1	0–0	0–3	3–0	2–0	1–1	4–1		0–1	3–0	2–2
Shrewsbury Town	2–0	1–0	3–0	0–0	0–0	4–2	1–1	4–1	3–1	4–1	5–1	2–3	1–0	0–2	4–2	3–0	2–2	0–0	3–3		1–2	2–1
Wimbledon	3–3	1–2	1–1	1–0	2–1	3–0	1–3	3–2	1–1	1–1	0–1	2–2	2–2	1–1	3–2	1–0	1–3	3–2	5–0	4–1		1–1
Wolverhampton Wanderers	0–1	0–2	0–3	0–1	3–0	0–2	1–0	2–1	0–4	0–1	2–1	0–2	2–0	0–0	2–3	0–3	1–2	0–0	2–2	0–1	3–3	

Legend: Blue = home team win; Yellow = draw; Red = away team win.

=== Second Division maps ===
Locations of the Football League Second Division London teams 1984–1985
Locations of the Football League Second Division 1984–1985 teams

== Third Division ==
Football LeagueThird Division
- Season: 1984–85
- Champions: Bradford City (1st title)
- Promoted: Millwall; Hull City
- Relegated: Burnley; Orient; Preston North End; Cambridge United
- Matches: 552
- Goals: 1,503 (2.72 per match)
- Top goalscorer: Tommy Tynan (Plymouth Argyle), 31

Bradford City's Third Division championship was overshadowed on the final day of the season, when a fire at their Valley Parade ground killed 56 spectators – including two followers of their opponents Lincoln City.

The other two promotion places in the Third Division were occupied by Millwall and Hull City.

Cambridge United, Orient, Burnley and Preston North End went down from the Third Division. Burnley and Preston were founder members of the Football League, and 25 years prior, Burnley had been league champions.

Swansea City, who had finished sixth in the First Division just three years earlier, continued to decline as a result of their financial problems, as they narrowly avoided a third successive relegation.

Pos	Team	Pld	W	D	L	GF	GA	GD	Pts	Promotion or relegation
1	Bradford City (C, P)	46	28	10	8	77	45	+32	94 (Note: Bradford City v. Lincoln City was abandoned after 40 mins; the result (0–0) stood.)	Promotion to the Second Division
2	Millwall (P)	46	26	12	8	73	42	+31	90	Promotion to the Second Division
3	Hull City (P)	46	25	12	9	78	49	+29	87	Promotion to the Second Division
4	Gillingham	46	25	8	13	80	62	+18	83	
5	Bristol City	46	24	9	13	74	47	+27	81	
6	Bristol Rovers	46	21	12	13	66	48	+18	75	
7	Derby County	46	19	13	14	65	54	+11	70	
8	York City	46	20	9	17	70	57	+13	69	
9	Reading	46	19	12	15	68	62	+6	69	
10	Bournemouth	46	19	11	16	57	46	+11	68	
11	Walsall	46	18	13	15	58	52	+6	67	
12	Rotherham United	46	18	11	17	55	55	0	65	
13	Brentford	46	16	14	16	62	64	−2	62	
14	Doncaster Rovers	46	17	8	21	72	74	−2	59	
15	Plymouth Argyle	46	15	14	17	62	65	−3	59	
16	Wigan Athletic	46	15	14	17	60	64	−4	59	
17	Bolton Wanderers	46	16	6	24	69	75	−6	54	
18	Newport County	46	13	13	20	55	67	−12	52	
19	Lincoln City	46	11	18	17	50	51	−1	51	
20	Swansea City	46	12	11	23	53	80	−27	47	
21	Burnley (R)	46	11	13	22	60	73	−13	46	Relegation to the Fourth Division
22	Orient (R)	46	11	13	22	51	76	−25	46	Relegation to the Fourth Division
23	Preston North End (R)	46	13	7	26	51	100	−49	46	Relegation to the Fourth Division
24	Cambridge United (R)	46	4	9	33	37	95	−58	21	Relegation to the Fourth Division

(C) Champions; (P) Promoted; (R) Relegated

=== Results ===
Home \ Away	BOL	BOU	BRA	BRE	BRC	BRR	BUR	CAM	DER	DON	GIL	HUL	LEY	LIN	MIL	NPC	PLY	PNE	REA	ROT	SWA	WAL	WIG	YOR
Bolton Wanderers		2–1	0–2	1–1	1–4	0–1	1–3	0–0	3–0	3–1	1–2	0–0	0–0	1–0	2–0	3–1	7–2	4–0	1–2	2–0	0–0	3–1	1–0	2–1
Bournemouth	4–0		4–1	1–0	2–1	1–0	1–1	0–0	1–0	1–3	2–0	1–1	1–0	3–1	1–2	3–0	1–0	2–0	0–3	3–0	1–2	4–1	1–0	4–0
Bradford City	2–1	1–0		5–4	1–1	2–0	3–2	2–0	3–1	0–1	1–1	2–0	4–1	0–0	3–1	1–0	1–0	3–0	2–5	1–1	1–1	1–1	4–2	1–0
Brentford	2–1	0–0	0–1		1–2	0–3	2–1	2–0	1–1	1–1	5–2	2–1	0–1	2–2	1–1	2–5	3–1	3–1	2–1	3–0	3–0	3–1	2–0	2–1
Bristol City	3–2	2–0	2–0	1–1		3–0	1–0	3–0	3–0	1–0	2–0	2–0	3–2	2–1	0–1	2–1	4–3	4–0	2–3	0–1	2–2	1–2	2–0	1–0
Bristol Rovers	1–2	1–0	2–0	3–0	1–0		4–0	2–1	2–1	1–1	3–2	1–1	0–1	0–0	1–1	2–1	1–0	3–0	1–0	1–0	4–2	0–0	2–0	1–1
Burnley	3–2	1–1	1–2	3–1	0–1	0–0		2–0	0–1	0–1	0–1	1–1	1–1	1–2	1–1	2–0	1–1	2–0	0–2	7–0	1–1	1–2	1–2	1–1
Cambridge United	2–3	1–0	0–4	1–2	2–3	0–2	2–3		0–2	1–1	1–2	1–3	2–3	0–2	1–0	1–2	1–1	0–3	0–2	0–2	0–2	0–1	1–1	0–4
Derby County	3–2	2–3	0–0	1–0	1–0	0–0	2–2	1–0		3–1	1–0	3–1	1–0	2–0	1–2	3–3	3–1	2–0	4–1	1–1	1–1	2–0	2–2	1–0
Doncaster Rovers	2–0	3–0	0–3	2–2	1–1	2–2	2–0	3–2	2–1		0–1	1–2	1–1	3–2	0–1	3–2	4–3	1–2	0–4	0–1	4–1	4–1	1–1	3–0
Gillingham	2–3	3–2	2–2	2–0	1–3	4–1	1–1	3–0	3–2	2–1		1–0	2–0	3–2	1–4	1–1	3–3	4–0	4–1	2–1	1–1	3–0	5–1	1–0
Hull City	2–2	3–0	0–2	4–0	2–1	2–0	2–0	2–1	3–2	3–2	2–0		5–1	1–0	2–1	2–0	2–2	1–2	0–0	0–0	4–1	1–0	3–1	0–2
Orient	4–3	0–0	1–0	0–1	0–1	1–4	0–2	2–2	2–2	2–1	2–4	4–5		1–0	1–0	1–1	3–0	0–0	0–0	0–1	4–2	0–3	1–1	1–3
Lincoln City	2–0	0–0	1–2	1–1	1–1	1–2	3–1	1–1	0–0	0–2	2–0	0–0	0–0		0–1	2–2	2–2	4–0	5–1	3–3	1–0	0–0	1–0	2–1
Millwall	5–2	2–1	4–0	2–0	1–1	1–0	2–1	2–1	2–1	2–1	2–1	2–2	1–0	2–0		2–0	2–0	3–0	0–0	0–0	2–0	0–0	4–1	1–0
Newport County	3–2	1–1	0–1	2–0	0–0	1–1	2–1	1–2	1–3	2–1	0–3	0–1	2–0	2–1	3–2		1–0	3–3	1–2	0–2	2–0	1–2	1–1	1–1
Plymouth Argyle	2–0	0–0	0–0	1–1	1–0	3–2	2–2	2–0	0–1	2–1	1–1	0–1	1–1	2–0	3–1	1–0		6–4	1–2	1–0	1–2	1–3	1–0	1–1
Preston North End	1–0	2–1	1–4	1–1	3–2	2–2	3–3	3–1	2–1	2–0	0–0	1–4	0–1	0–1	2–1	1–1	1–2		0–2	0–3	3–2	1–0	2–5	2–4
Reading	3–1	0–2	0–3	0–0	1–0	3–2	5–1	3–1	0–0	1–4	0–2	4–2	1–1	1–1	2–2	0–1	1–1	3–0		1–0	0–1	0–1	1–1	1–2
Rotherham United	3–1	1–0	1–2	1–1	2–1	3–3	3–2	0–1	2–0	2–3	1–0	1–1	2–1	0–0	0–0	1–0	0–2	3–0	3–0		0–1	0–1	3–3	4–1
Swansea City	2–1	0–0	1–2	3–2	0–0	3–2	0–1	2–2	1–5	3–1	0–1	0–2	3–1	2–2	1–2	0–3	0–2	4–1	1–2	1–0		1–2	2–2	1–3
Walsall	1–0	0–0	0–0	0–1	4–1	1–2	2–3	5–0	0–0	1–0	0–1	0–1	4–2	0–0	3–3	1–1	0–3	2–1	3–1	0–2	3–0		0–0	3–0
Wigan Athletic	1–0	1–2	1–0	1–1	2–2	1–0	2–0	3–3	2–0	5–2	0–1	1–1	4–2	1–0	0–1	1–1	1–0	2–0	1–0	2–1	2–0	1–2		1–2
York City	0–3	4–1	1–2	1–0	0–2	1–0	4–0	3–2	1–1	3–1	7–1	1–2	2–1	2–1	1–1	2–0	0–0	0–1	2–2	3–0	1–0	1–1	2–0	

Source: Soccerbase
Legend: Blue = home team win; Yellow = draw; Red = away team win.

=== Third Division maps ===
Locations of the Football League Third Division London teams 1984–1985
Locations of the Football League Third Division teams 1984–1985

== Fourth Division ==
Football LeagueFourth Division
- Season: 1984–85
- Champions: Chesterfield (2nd title)
- Promoted: Blackpool; Bury; Darlington
- Failed re-election: None
- Matches: 552
- Goals: 1,478 (2.68 per match)
- Top goalscorer: John Clayton (Tranmere Rovers), 31

Chesterfield, Blackpool, Darlington and Bury were promoted to the Third Division after occupying the Fourth Division's top four places.

The bottom four clubs, Halifax Town, Stockport County, Northampton Town, who had spent a season in the First Division 20 years earlier, and Torquay United, all retained their league status after a successful re-election campaign at the expense of Bath City, who were placed 4th in the Alliance Premier League and were the highest placed team there that would have met the Football League's requirements.

Pos	Team	Pld	W	D	L	GF	GA	GD	Pts	Promotion
1	Chesterfield (C, P)	46	26	13	7	64	35	+29	91	Promotion to the Third Division
2	Blackpool (P)	46	24	14	8	73	39	+34	86	Promotion to the Third Division
3	Darlington (P)	46	24	13	9	66	49	+17	85	Promotion to the Third Division
4	Bury (P)	46	24	12	10	76	50	+26	84	Promotion to the Third Division
5	Hereford United	46	22	11	13	65	47	+18	77	
6	Tranmere Rovers	46	24	3	19	83	66	+17	75	
7	Colchester United	46	20	14	12	87	65	+22	74	
8	Swindon Town	46	21	9	16	62	58	+4	72	
9	Scunthorpe United	46	19	14	13	83	62	+21	71	
10	Crewe Alexandra	46	18	12	16	65	69	−4	66	
11	Peterborough United	46	16	14	16	54	53	+1	62	
12	Port Vale	46	14	18	14	61	59	+2	60	
13	Aldershot	46	17	8	21	56	63	−7	59	
14	Mansfield Town	46	13	18	15	41	38	+3	57	
15	Wrexham	46	15	9	22	67	70	−3	54	
16	Chester City	46	15	9	22	60	72	−12	54	
17	Rochdale	46	13	14	19	55	69	−14	53	
18	Exeter City	46	13	14	19	57	79	−22	53	
19	Hartlepool United	46	14	10	22	54	67	−13	52	
20	Southend United	46	13	11	22	58	83	−25	50	
21	Halifax Town	46	15	5	26	42	69	−27	50	Re-elected
22	Stockport County	46	13	8	25	58	79	−21	47	Re-elected
23	Northampton Town	46	14	5	27	53	74	−21	47	Re-elected
24	Torquay United	46	9	14	23	38	63	−25	41	Re-elected

(C) Champions; (P) Promoted

=== Results ===
Home \ Away	ALD	BLP	BRY	CHE	CHF	COL	CRE	DAR	EXE	HAL	HAR	HER	MAN	NOR	PET	PTV	ROC	SCU	STD	STP	SWI	TOR	TRA	WRE
Aldershot		1–0	0–1	1–2	1–1	1–0	1–1	3–4	1–1	2–0	1–0	0–1	0–0	0–0	0–0	1–0	5–0	1–2	6–2	2–1	0–1	1–0	3–2	2–1
Blackpool	1–0		0–0	3–1	1–0	1–1	6–1	0–0	3–0	1–1	2–1	2–0	1–0	2–1	4–2	1–1	3–0	1–0	1–0	4–1	1–0	3–3	1–2	0–0
Bury	2–1	1–0		4–1	0–0	4–3	2–2	1–0	2–2	3–0	1–0	2–1	0–0	3–1	1–1	4–0	2–2	0–1	2–0	2–1	2–0	3–1	3–0	2–3
Chester City	2–0	0–0	2–3		1–1	1–2	0–2	5–2	1–3	2–0	1–0	2–1	0–3	1–0	1–3	2–0	0–1	1–1	5–1	2–1	2–0	0–1	2–4	2–1
Chesterfield	2–1	2–1	0–1	3–1		1–1	3–1	0–0	5–1	3–0	0–0	3–1	0–0	2–1	2–0	0–0	0–0	1–0	2–1	3–0	1–0	1–0	4–2	2–1
Colchester United	2–0	1–1	1–0	1–1	3–1		4–1	1–2	3–4	1–3	1–0	2–2	2–1	4–1	3–1	3–2	1–1	1–1	3–3	3–0	1–1	2–1	2–1	4–1
Crewe Alexandra	1–1	0–2	1–0	2–0	1–1	1–4		2–2	0–0	0–1	2–0	0–3	1–1	3–2	2–1	0–0	3–1	1–1	0–2	2–1	3–2	3–0	1–3	3–0
Darlington	1–1	0–4	1–1	2–1	1–3	4–0	2–1		2–1	2–0	0–1	1–1	3–1	4–0	2–1	1–1	1–0	2–1	3–1	3–1	1–0	1–0	2–1	2–1
Exeter City	3–0	1–1	0–2	1–1	0–1	1–5	0–2	1–1		1–0	3–2	0–0	0–0	5–0	0–1	2–1	1–1	2–1	2–1	0–2	1–1	4–3	0–1	2–0
Halifax Town	1–2	0–2	4–1	0–4	1–3	0–0	1–1	0–1	2–3		2–3	2–1	1–0	1–0	0–0	2–1	0–2	1–2	1–0	2–1	2–1	0–1	2–1	1–2
Hartlepool United	1–0	0–2	0–1	2–1	1–0	2–1	3–0	1–2	1–1	0–1		2–2	0–0	0–0	0–3	2–2	0–2	3–2	2–1	5–1	2–2	3–1	2–4	2–0
Hereford United	2–1	2–1	5–3	0–0	0–1	2–1	3–2	0–1	1–2	3–0	3–0		3–0	1–1	1–0	1–0	1–2	1–0	3–0	2–0	0–3	1–0	2–1	2–1
Mansfield Town	1–2	1–1	0–2	2–0	0–0	0–1	0–2	2–0	2–2	2–1	2–0	1–1		2–0	0–0	1–1	5–1	0–1	1–0	1–0	0–0	1–0	0–0	1–0
Northampton Town	4–0	0–1	0–1	0–2	1–3	1–3	1–3	2–1	5–2	0–1	2–0	0–3	1–0		0–3	1–0	0–0	0–2	1–2	4–0	4–0	3–1	2–0	0–4
Peterborough United	1–2	2–0	1–4	3–1	0–0	0–1	2–1	1–1	0–0	2–0	3–1	1–1	1–0	0–0		0–0	1–1	3–1	1–4	3–1	0–1	1–0	1–0	2–1
Port Vale	1–2	1–1	0–0	0–0	0–0	3–2	2–0	0–2	5–1	3–1	1–1	3–1	0–1	0–3	3–1		3–1	1–1	4–1	3–2	2–0	2–2	2–1	0–0
Rochdale	1–2	1–1	1–1	1–2	3–1	1–1	1–3	1–2	2–0	2–0	4–3	0–1	2–1	3–0	2–1	1–2		3–3	2–2	0–0	0–1	0–0	2–1	0–2
Scunthorpe United	2–1	1–1	2–2	2–1	2–4	2–2	2–3	0–1	7–1	4–0	2–0	1–1	2–2	2–1	2–1	3–3	4–2		2–1	1–0	6–2	2–0	5–2	5–2
Southend United	1–0	1–4	3–3	1–1	0–1	2–5	3–1	1–1	1–0	2–1	1–1	0–0	1–3	2–1	2–1	1–1	0–2	1–1		1–1	3–2	1–0	2–3	0–1
Stockport County	6–0	1–3	2–0	5–1	0–1	1–0	0–1	0–0	1–0	0–3	4–1	2–1	1–1	4–2	1–1	3–1	1–1	2–0	1–2		2–1	1–2	0–2	2–2
Swindon Town	2–1	4–1	1–0	4–4	4–0	2–1	1–1	1–0	2–0	2–1	2–1	0–3	1–0	2–0	1–1	0–1	2–1	0–0	2–0	4–0		1–3	2–1	2–1
Torquay United	1–3	0–2	0–2	2–0	0–1	1–1	0–0	1–1	1–1	1–1	0–1	1–0	1–0	0–2	0–0	1–3	1–0	0–0	2–2	0–0	0–0		1–1	4–3
Tranmere Rovers	4–3	3–0	3–2	1–0	0–1	3–1	3–1	3–0	3–2	1–0	1–2	0–1	0–0	1–2	4–0	4–1	3–1	2–0	2–0	3–0	0–2	3–1		3–1
Wrexham	1–0	1–2	3–0	2–0	2–0	2–2	1–3	1–1	2–0	0–1	1–1	1–1	2–2	0–3	1–3	1–1	2–0	2–1	1–2	3–4	4–0	2–0	4–0	

Updated to match(es) played on compreat. Source: Soccerbase
Legend: Blue = home team win; Yellow = draw; Red = away team win.

=== Fourth Division maps ===
Locations of the Football League Fourth Division teams 1984–1985

== Election/re-election to the Football League ==
This year the top three teams in the 1984–85 Alliance Premier League, Wealdstone, Nuneaton Borough and Dartford, could not apply for election because they did not meet Football League requirements, so fourth-placed Bath City won the right to apply for election to the Football League to replace one of the four bottom sides in the 1984–85 Football League Fourth Division. The vote went as follows:

Club	Final Position	Votes
Northampton Town	23rd (Fourth Division)	52
Stockport County	22nd (Fourth Division)	50
Torquay United	24th (Fourth Division)	50
Halifax Town	21st (Fourth Division)	48
Bath City	4th (Alliance Premier League)	8

As a result of this, all four Football League teams were re-elected, and Bath City were denied membership of the Football League.

== Attendances ==
=== First Division ===
#	Football club	Home games	Average attendance
1	Manchester United	21	42,881
2	Liverpool FC	21	34,444
3	Everton FC	21	31,984
4	Arsenal FC	21	31,205
5	Tottenham Hotspur	21	28,930
6	Sheffield Wednesday	21	27,781
7	Newcastle United	21	26,228
8	Chelsea FC	21	23,065
9	West Ham United	21	18,433
10	Sunderland AFC	21	18,347
11	Aston Villa	21	18,318
12	Watford FC	21	18,246
13	Southampton FC	21	18,046
14	Ipswich Town	21	17,220
15	Nottingham Forest	21	16,781
16	Norwich City	21	15,100
17	Leicester City	21	14,546
18	Queens Park Rangers	21	14,000
19	West Bromwich Albion	21	13,849
20	Coventry City	21	12,848
21	Luton Town	21	10,816
22	Stoke City	21	10,700

=== Second Division ===
#	Football club	Home games	Average attendance
1	Manchester City	21	24,220
2	Portsmouth FC	21	15,185
3	Leeds United	21	15,161
4	Birmingham City	21	12,733
5	Sheffield United	21	12,055
6	Brighton & Hove Albion	21	11,798
7	Oxford United	21	10,577
8	Blackburn Rovers	21	9,648
9	Wolverhampton Wanderers	21	8,375
10	Huddersfield Town	21	7,238
11	Barnsley FC	21	7,225
12	Grimsby Town	21	6,458
13	Crystal Palace FC	21	6,446
14	Notts County	21	6,211
15	Fulham FC	21	6,179
16	Middlesbrough FC	21	5,135
17	Charlton Athletic	21	5,104
18	Shrewsbury Town	21	4,715
19	Oldham Athletic	21	4,713
20	Wimbledon FC	21	4,391
21	Cardiff City	21	4,363
22	Carlisle United	21	4,016

== See also ==
- 1984-85 in English football
