= Chesterfield F.C. =

Association football club in Chesterfield, England

Chesterfield
- Full name: Chesterfield Football Club
- Nickname: Spireites
- Founded: 19 October 1866; 160 years ago (original); 24 April 1919; 107 years ago (current)
- Ground: SMH Group Stadium
- Capacity: 10,600
- Owner: Ashley Kirk
- Chairman: Ashley Kirk
- Manager: Paul Cook
- League: EFL League Two
- 2025–26: EFL League Two, 6th of 24
- Website: chesterfield-fc.co.uk
Home colours	Away colours

Chesterfield Football Club is a professional association football club based in the town of Chesterfield, Derbyshire, England. The team, known as the Spireites after the town's Crooked Spire, competes in EFL League Two, the fourth level of the English football league system, after winning the 2023–24 National League title.

Chesterfield play their home games at the 10,600 capacity SMH Group Stadium, having moved from their historic home of Saltergate during the summer of 2010. Notable former players include record appearance holder Dave Blakey, who played in 617 of Chesterfield's league games, and record goalscorer Ernie Moss, who scored 162 league goals for the club. The club contests numerous local rivalries, most notably The Miners Strike Derby with Nottinghamshire club Mansfield Town.

Chesterfield FC was officially established in 1867, but it was the third incarnation of the club, formed in 1891 that turned professional and adopted the name Chesterfield Town. The club entered the FA Cup for the first time the following year, and competed in the Sheffield & District League and Sheffield & Hallamshire Senior Cup, before joining the Midland League in 1896–97. A third-place finish in 1898–99 resulted in a successful application to the Football League Second Division for the following season. After ten seasons in the Second Division, they failed to gain re-election to the League and returned to the Midland League in 1909 where they were champions in 1909–10. The club entered liquidation in 1915, and were reformed as Chesterfield Municipal in April 1919. They again rejoined the Midland League and finished as champions in 1919–20.

The club was renamed Chesterfield FC in December 1920, and became founder members of the Third Division North in 1921–22. They marked their tenth season in the division, 1930–31, by winning the title, though they only managed two seasons in the Second Division before suffering relegation. They again won the Third Division North title in 1935–36, and after World War II recorded their best ever league finish of fourth in the Second Division in 1946–47. However they were relegated again in 1950–51, and were relegated out of the Third Division in 1960–61. Chesterfield won the Fourth Division in 1969–70, and then won the Anglo-Scottish Cup in 1980. After relegation in 1982–83, they again won the Fourth Division title in 1984–85, though would again be relegated after five seasons in the third tier. They secured their return to the third tier with a 2–0 win over Bury in the 1995 play-off final at Wembley.

Chesterfield reached the FA Cup semi-finals in 1997, but were relegated back to the fourth tier in 1999–2000. They made an immediate return to the third tier after securing an automatic promotion place in 2000–01. Relegated in 2006–07, they secured the League Two title in 2010–11, but were relegated from League One the following season. In 2011, Dave Allen took full ownership of the club and oversaw progress to two League Trophy finals; Chesterfield won the trophy with a 2–0 victory over Swindon Town in 2012, and finished as runners-up after losing 3–1 to Peterborough United in 2014. Chesterfield were crowned champions of League Two for a record fourth time in 2013–14, but remained in League One for just three seasons. Back-to-back relegations saw the club relegated out of the English Football League at the end of the 2017–18 season, before returning to League Two after winning the National League title in the 2023–24 season.

== History ==
A former Chesterfield FC crest giving an 1866 foundation date of Chesterfield FC. The design was first used in 1997 and replaced in 2009

Chart of historic table positions of Chesterfield in the Football League

Potentially five or more teams have been called Chesterfield Football Club at different times. A Derbyshire Times newspaper report from 2 January 1864 noted a scheduled game between "Chesterfield and Norton football clubs", suggesting that a Chesterfield FC, whether loosely or formally organised, was active from at least 1863.

A second Chesterfield FC was formally created as an offshoot of Chesterfield Cricket Club in October 1867. The cricket and football clubs moved to the Recreation Ground at Saltergate in 1871, the same year that they became separate entities. However, a souring of the relationship between the two led to the closure of the football club in 1881, when it found itself homeless. Many players joined other local sides, notably Chesterfield Livingstone, a club that took up using the Saltergate site, and Spital, a works team which competed in the early years of the FA Cup.

Three years later, in 1884, a third entity called Chesterfield Football Club was formed, again making its home at Saltergate. It drew in players from the preceding club and both Chesterfield Livingstone and Chesterfield Spital, though records show Spital continued as a separate club until 1888. After changing its name to Chesterfield Town, the club turned professional in 1891 and won several local trophies in the following two seasons, entering the FA Cup for the first time in 1892. For the 1892–93 season, the club wore an extraordinary playing strip of all dark blue with the Union Jack emblazoned across the front of the shirt. Chesterfield joined the Midland League in 1896, and successfully applied for a place in the Second Division of the Football League at the start of the 1899–1900 season, finishing seventh. After finishing bottom of the League for three consecutive seasons, the club failed to gain re-election to the League in 1909, returning to the Midland League.

In 1915 Chesterfield Town was put into voluntary liquidation and a new club with the same name was formed by a local restaurateur to play wartime football using locally based "guests" from Football League clubs. It lasted only two years before its management and players were suspended by the FA for illegal payments and the club shut down.

The current Chesterfield FC was formed on 24 April 1919 by Chesterfield Borough Council, seeing it as a way to spearhead improvements in local recreational provision. Initially called "Chesterfield Municipal", the club made great strides on the pitch in its first season, lifting the Midland League title – and did so despite three changes of management. However, The Football Association and the Football League had already made clear their vehement opposition to a council-run club and ultimately forced it to cut its ties and become independent, reflected in a name change to Chesterfield FC in December 1920.

In 1921–22, Chesterfield became a founder member of the new Football League Third Division North. Following the arrival of new manager Ted Davison in 1926 and chairman Harold Shentall in 1928, the club won the Third Division North title in the 1930–31 season with an 8–1 victory over Gateshead on the final day, and were promoted to the Second Division. Relegation followed in 1933, but the Third Division North title was again won in 1936.

After the war the club achieved their best League position, finishing fourth in the Second Division in 1946–47. However, the sale of several players at the end of the season reduced their overall quality, and Chesterfield were relegated at the end of the 1950–51 season. They were placed in the Third Division on its formation at the start of the 1958–59 season; future England international goalkeeper Gordon Banks made his professional debut in a Third Division game in November 1958, but was sold to Leicester City for a then-club record £7,000 fee at the end of the season. In 1961 Chesterfield were relegated to the Fourth Division for the first time.

Chesterfield spent eight seasons in the Fourth Division, earning promotion as champions in 1969–70 under manager Jimmy McGuigan. The Anglo-Scottish Cup was won in 1981. The club was relegated in 1983–84, and won the Fourth Division title the following season. Financial difficulties forced Chesterfield Borough Council to bail out the club in 1985 and the club's training ground to be sold. Relegation followed in 1988–89; Chesterfield reached the play-off competition a year later, but were beaten by Cambridge United in the play-off final. The arrival of John Duncan as manager in 1993 was followed in the 1994–95 season by play-off victories over local rivals Mansfield Town and Bury to earn promotion to the redesignated Second Division. The 1996–97 season saw Chesterfield beat six clubs including Premier League side Nottingham Forest to reach the semi-final of the FA Cup for the first time. The semi-final match against Middlesbrough was contentiously drawn 3–3 after extra time; Chesterfield lost the replay 3–0.

The club were relegated to the Third Division in 2000 following a run of 21 games without a win, and chairman Norton Lea was replaced by Darren Brown. The following year, Chesterfield were deducted nine points for financial irregularities after Brown attempted to avoid paying Chester City the fee agreed by the FA for Luke Beckett. Amid mounting evidence of fraud, he relinquished control of the club in March 2001 and ownership passed to a hastily organised fans' group, the Chesterfield Football Supporters Society. Massive debts run up by Brown forced the club into administration, but the team still secured the division's final automatic promotion place. Brown was later sentenced to four years in prison following a Serious Fraud Office investigation that led to charges including false accounting, furnishing false information and theft.

Chesterfield were relegated to League Two at the end of the 2006–07 season, although they did reach the regional semi-final of the League Trophy and the fourth round of the League Cup in the same year. The club departed its historic home at Saltergate at the end of the 2009–10 season, and moved to newly built B2net Stadium. Chesterfield were promoted to League One after winning the League Two title in 2010–11 season. Later that year, Dave Allen took a majority shareholding of the football club from the Supporters Society. They went on to win the Football League Trophy for the first time in March 2012, defeating Swindon Town 2–0 in the final. However, they were relegated from League One the following month, with Allen taking over as chairman from Barrie Hubbard in the off-season. The club again returned to the third tier as League Two champions at the end of the 2013–14 season for a record fourth time under the guidance of manager Paul Cook.

Chesterfield secured sixth-place in League One at the end of the 2014–15 campaign, and went on to lose 4–0 on aggregate to Preston North End in the two-legged play-off semi-final. Cook departed at the end of the season. On 14 November 2016, Dave Allen resigned from his roles as chairman and director of the club. This signaled a crisis, and four days later a further four directors resigned from their roles. It was announced that Chesterfield was openly up for sale, and desperately needed some kind of investment in order to avoid administration. Mike Warner was installed as chairman on 19 November.

Chesterfield were relegated from League One in 2016–17, finishing bottom of the league. At the end of the 2017–18 season, Chesterfield suffered a second consecutive relegation, with the club playing outside the Football League for the first time since 1921. On 6 August 2020, it was announced that Chesterfield FC Community Trust, a charity associated with the club, had bought the club from previous owner Dave Allen. The following day, the Trust announced that John Pemberton had been appointed full-time manager, following a spell as caretaker manager from January 2020, during which time he was able to prevent the club's relegation to National League North.

In January 2022, the club faced Chelsea in the third round of the FA Cup, losing 5–1 to the Premier League side. After relegation from the Football League, Chesterfield had three unsuccessful play-off campaigns, including losing the 2023 National League play-off final on penalties to Notts County. The club then won the National League title in the following season to return to the Football League after six seasons in non-League. During this season, the ownership of the club was transferred to brothers Phil and Ashley Kirk by the Community Trust.

== Kit manufacturers and sponsors ==
Table of kit suppliers and sponsors:

Period	Sportswear	Sponsor
1976–1979	Bukta	No shirt sponsor
1979–1982	Adidas	No shirt sponsor
1982–1983	Latif	No shirt sponsor
1983–1988	Latif	Coalite
1988–1990	Bukta	Coalite
1990–1992	Matchwinner	Coalite
1992–1994	Matchwinner	North Derbyshire Health Authority/Gordon Lamb
1994–1996	Matchwinner	North Derbyshire Health Authority/GK

Period	Sportswear	Sponsor
1996–1998	Super League	North Derbyshire Health Authority
1998–2000	Super League	Kenning Autos
2000–2001	Aspire	Gordon Lamb
2001–2002	TFG	Gordon Lamb
2002–2003	Turf Sports	Gordon Lamb/Vodka Kick
2003–2004	Uhlsport	Gordon Lamb/Vodka Kick
2004–2005	Branded	Autoworld/Vodka Kick
2005–2007	TFG	Autoworld/Vodka Kick

Period	Sportswear	Sponsor
2007–2008	Lotto	Vodka Kick
2008–2010	Bukta	Vodka Kick
2010–2012	Respect	Vodka Kick
2012–2013	Puma	Kick Energy
2013–2016	Puma	NAPIT
2016–2019	Puma	G F Tomlinson
2019–2022	Puma	Technique Learning
2022–	Puma	Leengate Valves

== Stadium ==
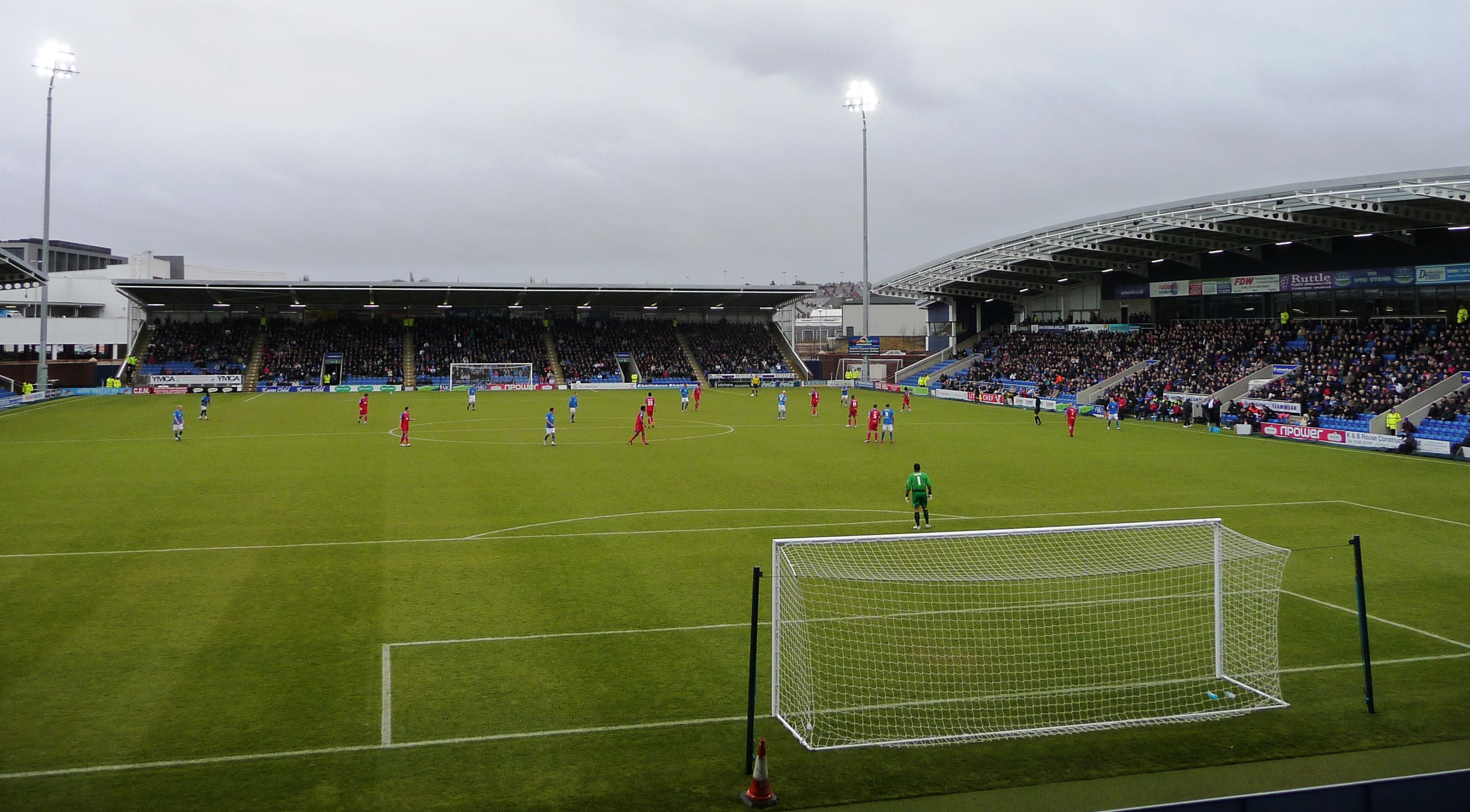
Proact Stadium in February 2011

Chesterfield's historic ground was Saltergate, officially named the Recreation Ground, which was in use from 1872 to 2010. Saltergate's record attendance was 30,561, which was set when Chesterfield hosted Tottenham Hotspur in the FA Cup fifth round in February 1938.

Since the 2010–11 season, Chesterfield have played their home games at the £13 million B2net Stadium. The first match was against Derby County in a pre-season friendly, which Derby won 5–4, Craig Davies becoming the first goalscorer at the stadium. The first competitive fixture was against Barnet, which ended in a 2–1 win after Dwayne Mattis scored the opening League goal at the ground in the first half. Chesterfield suffered their first home league defeat at the B2net Stadium with a 2–1 loss to Burton Albion on 13 November 2010.

On 13 August 2012, it was announced that, after the acquisition of b2net by Proact, the stadium would be renamed the Proact Stadium.

On 15 May 2020, it was announced that, from August, the stadium would be renamed the Technique Stadium after local education provider Technique acquired the naming rights.

In 2023, the stadium was renamed the SMH Group Stadium after new sponsors, financial services company SMH group, acquired naming rights for a minimum of three years.

The highest attendance at the SMH group stadium was 10,108 at home in their last match of the 2023–24 National League season against Maidenhead United which Chesterfield won 3–2.

== Rivalries ==
Chesterfield's geographical position means that the club has many local rivals.

Chesterfield compete in The Miners Strike Derby against Nottinghamshire club Mansfield Town. The derby originated due to the 1984-85 Miners' Strike, with those in Derbyshire largely striking, while those in Nottinghamshire did not, leading to the latter being referred to as 'scabs'. The last fixture between the sides endes with a 2–0 win for Mansfield at the SMH Group Stadium.

Chesterfield also have rivalries with nearby South Yorkshire clubs Rotherham United, Sheffield Wednesday and Sheffield United. The rivalries with Sheffield United and Sheffield Wednesday both came to the fore with the two playing in League One at periods in the 2010s. The Spireites have encountered United much more in recent years, continuing to meet in the third level of English football until 2017.

A slight rivalry with Grimsby Town intensified with a number of feisty encounters over the years.

== Players ==
=== Current squad ===
As of 5 September 2026

Note: Flags indicate national team as defined under FIFA eligibility rules; some limited exceptions apply. Players may hold more than one non-FIFA nationality.

No.	Pos.	Nation	Player
1	GK	ENG	Zach Hemming
2	DF	ENG	Malik Owolabi-Belewu
4	MF	ENG	Tom Naylor (captain)
5	DF	ENG	Kyle McFadzean
6	DF	ENG	Jack Simpson
7	MF	ENG	Liam Mandeville
8	MF	WAL	Ryan Stirk
9	FW	SCO	Fraser Bryden
10	FW	NIR	Lee Bonis
11	FW	IRL	Dylan Duffy
15	DF	ENG	Alfie Pond
16	MF	SCO	Luke Butterfield
17	FW	CYP	Ruel Sotiriou
18	FW	ENG	Louie Marsh (on loan from Sheffield United)
19	DF	SCO	Lewis Gordon
20	MF	ENG	George McEachran
21	FW	LAT	Danny Anisjko

No.	Pos.	Nation	Player
22	DF	JAM	Chey Dunkley
23	GK	ENG	Ryan Boot
24	FW	ENG	Dilan Markanday
25	FW	ENG	Will Dickson
26	DF	ENG	Junior Eccleston
27	MF	ENG	Kiano Dyer (on loan from Chelsea)
30	MF	ENG	Rafiq Lamptey (on loan from Millwall)
31	MF	ENG	Joel Randall (on loan from Bolton Wanderers)
33	DF	ENG	Remeao Hutton
37	FW	SLE	Josh Koroma (on loan from Leyton Orient)
40	MF	ENG	Connor Cook
41	FW	MLT	Gunner Elliott
42	DF	ENG	Alex Whitney
43	GK	MLT	James Sissons
46	DF	ENG	Tom Pearce

=== Out on loan ===
Note: Flags indicate national team as defined under FIFA eligibility rules; some limited exceptions apply. Players may hold more than one non-FIFA nationality.

No.	Pos.	Nation	Player

=== Retired numbers ===
Note: Flags indicate national team as defined under FIFA eligibility rules; some limited exceptions apply. Players may hold more than one non-FIFA nationality.

No.	Pos.	Nation	Player
14	FW	ENG	Jack Lester (2007–2013 as a player; 2017–2018 as manager)

== Club officials ==
Management and backroom staff

As of 7 December 2022

Position	Name
Manager	Paul Cook
Assistant manager	Danny Webb
First team coach	Gary Roberts
First team coach	Paddy Byrne
Goalkeeping coach	Dave O'Hare
Head of recruitment	Neill Hornby
Kit Man	Jason Baker
First-team analyst	Jack Stephenson
Academy manager	Neil Cluxton

=== Managerial history ===
Name	Nationality	Years
Edwin Russell Timmeus	(England) English	1891–1895
Gilbert Gillies	(Scotland) Scottish	1895–1901
Edmund Francis Hind	(England) English	1901–1902
Jack Hoskin	(England) English	1902–1906
Walter Furness	(England) English	1906–1907
George Swift	(England) English	1907–1910
Ben Sharpe	(England) English	1910–1911
George H. Jones	(England) English	1911–1913
Reg Weston	(England) English	1913–1917
Tom Callaghan	(England) English	1919
Jim Caffrey	(England) English	1920–1922
Harry Hadley	(England) English	1922
Harry Parkes	(England) English	1922–1927
Alec Campbell	(England) English	1927
Teddy Davison	(England) English	1927–1932
Bill Harvey	(England) English	1932–1938
Norman Bullock	(England) English	1938–1945
Bob Brocklebank	(England) English	1945–1948
Bobby Marshall	(England) English	1948–1952
Teddy Davison	(England) English	1952–1958
Duggie Livingstone	(Scotland) Scottish	1958–1962
Tony McShane	(Northern Ireland) Northern Irish	1962–1967
Jimmy McGuigan	(Scotland) Scottish	1967–1973
Joe Shaw	(England) English	1973–1976
Arthur Cox	(England) English	1976–1980
Frank Barlow	(England) English	1980–1983
John Duncan	(Scotland) Scottish	1983–1987
Kevin Randall	(England) English	1987–1988
Paul Hart	(England) English	1988–1991
Chris McMenemy	(England) English	1991–1993
John Duncan	(Scotland) Scottish	1993–2000
Nicky Law	(England) English	2000–2001
Dave Rushbury	(England) English	2002–2003
Roy McFarland	(England) English	2003–2007
Lee Richardson	(England) English	2007–2009
John Sheridan	(Republic of Ireland) Irish	2009–2012
Paul Cook	(England) English	2012–2015
Dean Saunders	(Wales) Welsh	2015
Danny Wilson	(Northern Ireland) Northern Irish	2015–2017
Gary Caldwell	(Scotland) Scottish	2017
Jack Lester	(England) English	2017–2018
Martin Allen	(England) English	2018
John Sheridan	(Republic of Ireland) Irish	2019–2020
John Pemberton	(England) English	2020
James Rowe	(England) English	2020–2022
Paul Cook	(England) English	2022–

== Honours ==
League

- Third Division North (level 3)
  - Champions: 1930–31, 1935–36
- Fourth Division / Third Division / League Two (level 4)
  - Champions: 1969–70, 1984–85, 2010–11, 2013–14
  - Promoted: 2000–01
  - Play-off winners: 1995
- National League (level 5)
  - Champions: 2023–24
- Midland League
  - Champions: 1909–10, 1919–20

Cup

- Football League Trophy
  - Winners: 2011–12
  - Runners-up: 2013–14
- Anglo-Scottish Cup
  - Winners: 1980–81
- Derbyshire Senior Cup
  - Winners (7): 1898–99, 1920–21, 1921–22, 1924–25, 1932–33, 1936–37, 2017–18

Notes

- Derbyshire Senior Cup is competed for by all registered Derbyshire FA clubs. Until season 2010–11, Chesterfield and Derby County did not enter teams and in turn competed in their own competition called the Derbyshire FA Centenary Cup. Both Chesterfield and Derby County have fielded reserve sides in the Derbyshire Senior Cup since season 2010–11.

=== Club records ===
Highest Football League finish	1946–47, 4th place in Football League Second Division (second tier)
Best FA Cup finish	1996–97, semi-finalists
Best League Trophy finish	Winners: 2011–12
Highest home attendance	30,561: vs. Tottenham Hotspur, 12 February 1938
Most league appearances	Dave Blakey: 617, 1948–1967
Most league goals	Ernie Moss: 162, 1968–1975, 1979–1981, 1984–1986
Youngest player	Dennis Thompson: 16 years 159 days
Oldest player	Billy Kidd: 40 years 232 days
