= Owen Williams (rugby union, born 1986) =

Welsh rugby union footballer

- Born: Owen Rhys Williams; 27 January 1986 (age 40) Blackwood, Wales
- Height: 6 ft 4 in (1.93 m)
- Weight: 16 st 0 lb (102 kg)

Rugby union career
- Position: Wing
Amateur team(s)
Years	Team	Apps	(Points)
- Blackwood RFC
Senior career
Years	Team	Apps	(Points)
2008–2014	Pontypridd RFC	118	(240)
National sevens team
Years	Team		Comps
- Wales Sevens

Owen Rhys Williams (born 27 January 1986) is a Welsh former rugby union player who played as a wing. Born in Blackwood, Caerphilly, he played for Blackwood RFC and Pontypridd RFC, as well as the Wales Sevens team.

Williams began playing for Blackwood in the club's junior division at the age of 11. While playing for the youth team, Williams began to suffer from chronic fatigue syndrome, which rendered him unable to play for two seasons. By 2007, his health had improved to the point where he was able to join the Blackwood senior team. In February 2008, Pontypridd RFC visited Blackwood's Glan-yr-Afon Park for a Konica Minolta Cup match, in which Williams impressed enough for the Premiership side to sign him on permit for the rest of the 2007–08 season; Williams' season culminated with him starting for Pontypridd in the Konica Minolta Cup Final against Neath. Ponty signed Williams permanently ahead of the 2008–09 season.

In early 2011, Williams was called up to the Wales Sevens Development Team, and captained the team for a FIRA–AER tournament in Spain. In December that year, he was called up to the senior Wales Sevens team for the 2011 South Africa Sevens, helping the team to win the Plate after being eliminated from the Cup in the quarter-finals. A successful year saw Williams nominated for the Pontypridd RFC Player of the Year award for 2011. He left Pontypridd at the end of the 2013–14 season. He then joined Ebbw Vale RFC, before moving to Newport RFC in January 2016. In June 2017, he signed for Pontypool RFC.

Williams is also a maths teacher, working at Ferndale Comprehensive School in the Rhondda.
