= Alfred Geddes =

English footballer

Jasper Geddes
Personal information
- Full name: Alfred John Geddes
- Date of birth: 1871
- Place of birth: West Bromwich, Birmingham, England
- Date of death: 1927 (aged 55–56)
- Place of death: England
- Position: Outside left

Youth career
- 1890: Causeway Green Villa

Senior career*
Years	Team	Apps	(Gls)
1891–1894	West Bromwich Albion	70	(22)
1894	Clapton Rovers	??	(??)
1894–1895	Millwall	15	(8)
1895–1896	West Bromwich Albion	3	(3)
1895–1899	Millwall	87	(33)
1899–1900	Bedminster	33	(10)
1900–1901	Bristol City	23	(4)
1901–1902	Bristol Rovers	7	(0)
- * Club domestic league appearances and goals

Alf "Jasper" Geddes (born 1871 in West Bromwich and died 1927) was an English footballer who played as an outside left. He made over 70 Football League and 130 Southern League appearances in the years before the First World War.

== Career ==
Jasper Geddes played locally for Causeway Green Villa before joining West Bromwich Albion and playing for three seasons in the First Division; West Bromwich also won the FA Cup in 1892 during this period. Geddes then moved south via Clapton Rovers to Millwall to play in the Southern League. Geddes had second spells with firstly, West Bromwich Albion, in the Football League for one season during which West Brom were FA Cup runners up. Then secondly returning to Millwall in the Southern League for four seasons including 1896-97 when he had his most successful scoring season with 12 goals.

Geddes finished his career in Bristol playing in the Southern League in successive seasons for three Bristol clubs. Sam Hollis signed Geddes in July 1899 from Millwall for Bedminster and Geddes moved to Bristol City in the following summer when Bedminster merged with Bristol City. Geddes played a final season in 1901–02 with Bristol Rovers.

== Honours ==
Millwall

- Southern Football League champions: 1894–95, 1895–96

West Bromwich Albion

- FA Cup: 1891–92
