= William Neale (footballer) =

English footballer

Personal information
- Full name: William Neale
- Date of birth: 1872
- Place of birth: West Bromwich, England
- Date of death: 1901 (aged 28–29)
- Position: Inside forward

Senior career*
Years	Team	Apps	(Gls)
1891–1892	Grove Hill Saints		
1892–1894	West Bromwich Albion	6	(3)
1894	Brierley Hill Alliance		
Total		6	(3)
- * Club domestic league appearances and goals

William Neale (1872–1901) was an English footballer who played in the Football League for West Bromwich Albion.
