= Ben Hadley =

English footballer

Personal information
- Full name: Benjamin Hadley
- Date of birth: 1871
- Place of birth: West Bromwich, England
- Date of death: 1937 (aged 65–66)
- Position: Centre half

Senior career*
Years	Team	Apps	(Gls)
1889–1890	Grestone Harriers		
1890–1892	Hereford Thistle		
1892–1896	West Bromwich Albion	7	(1)
1896	Hereford Town		
Total		7	(1)
- * Club domestic league appearances and goals

Benjamin Hadley (1871–1937) was an English footballer who played in the Football League for West Bromwich Albion.
