= Miners' strike derby =

English association football competition

- Location: (England) East Midlands
- Teams: Chesterfield; Mansfield Town
- First meeting: Mansfield Town 0–3 Chesterfield (7 October 1933); 1933–34 Third Division North
- Latest meeting: Mansfield Town 3–5 Chesterfield; 10 November 2026; 2026–27 EFL Trophy
- Stadiums: SMH Group Stadium (Chesterfield); Field Mill (Mansfield Town)

Statistics
- Total meetings: 78
- Most wins: Chesterfield (30)
- Most player appearances: See below (4)
- Top scorer: Steve Wilkinson (5)
- All-time record: Chesterfield: 31; Draw: 18; Mansfield Town: 29

The Miners' strike derby or Derbyshire–Nottinghamshire derby is an association football club rivalry between Chesterfield and Mansfield Town, first contested in 1933. Chesterfield play at the SMH Group Stadium in Chesterfield, Derbyshire, while Mansfield Town play at the Field Mill in Mansfield, Nottinghamshire; the two grounds are separated by 12 miles (19 km). The teams have played 78 matches in all competitions; Chesterfield winning 31, Mansfield Town winning 29 and the remaining 18 being drawn.

== History ==
The first meeting between the two clubs occurred on 7 October 1933, when Mansfield Town hosted Chesterfield, a game Chesterfield won 3–0.

This fixture has always been fiercely contested owing to the close proximity of the clubs. At the height of early 1970s football hooliganism, the fixture led to scenes of mass street fighting in both town centres.

The 1984–1985 United Kingdom miners' strike intensified the rivalry further. Both the towns of Chesterfield and Mansfield were historically involved in coal mining. Margaret Thatcher's closure programme targeting every UK coal mine threatened job losses, leading to many mining towns and cities including Chesterfield going on strike. Miners in Mansfield however continued to work because there was no national strike ballot. This led to Chesterfield supporters using the nicknames "Scabs" and "Strike-Breakers" against Mansfield's. Mansfield Town supporters responded with nicknames for Chesterfield's such as "Arthur's Little Lemmings" and "Pet Eaters" (from the story of a striking miner's family eating a pet rabbit).

In Mansfield, The Union Of Democratic Mineworkers (UDM) was set up. They became known as "Maggie Thatcher's Miners" due to the organisation being set up in co-operation with Thatcher. She convinced the UDM that Mansfield miners could work in privatised coal mines, though, all mines around Mansfield eventually closed.

== Head-to-head ==
=== Statistics ===
As of 12 August 2025

Competition	Played	Chesterfield wins	Draws	Mansfield wins	Chesterfield goals	Mansfield goals	H2H
League	66	24	15	27	86	88	+3
Play-offs	2	1	1	0	6	3	+1
FA Cup	1	1	0	0	3	1	+1
League Cup	5	2	2	1	9	7	+1
EFL Trophy	4	3	0	1	9	7	+2
Total	78	31	18	29	113	106	+2

=== List of matches ===
League

#	Season	Date	Competition	Home Team	Result	Away Team	Stadium	Attendance	H2H
1	1933–34	7 October 1933	Third Division North	Mansfield	0–3	Chesterfield	Field Mill	14,184	+1
2	1933–34	17 February 1934	Third Division North	Chesterfield	3–2	Mansfield	Saltergate	12,298	+2
3	1934–35	15 September 1934	Third Division North	Mansfield	1–0	Chesterfield	Field Mill	8,424	+1
4	1934–35	26 January 1935	Third Division North	Chesterfield	0–0	Mansfield	Saltergate	5,026	+1
5	1935–36	7 December 1935	Third Division North	Mansfield	0–1	Chesterfield	Field Mill	6,230	+2
6	1935–36	11 April 1936	Third Division North	Chesterfield	2–1	Mansfield	Saltergate	10,523	+3
7	1951–52	22 September 1951	Third Division North	Chesterfield	1–1	Mansfield	Saltergate	17,446	+3
8	1951–52	26 January 1952	Third Division North	Mansfield	2–1	Chesterfield	Field Mill	10,411	+2
9	1952–53	23 August 1952	Third Division North	Chesterfield	4–1	Mansfield	Saltergate	18,506	+3
10	1952–53	20 December 1952	Third Division North	Mansfield	1–4	Chesterfield	Field Mill	6,802	+4
11	1953–54	14 September 1953	Third Division North	Mansfield	2–2	Chesterfield	Field Mill	11,185	+4
12	1953–54	1 January 1954	Third Division North	Chesterfield	0–0	Mansfield	Saltergate	12,259	+4
13	1954–55	4 September 1954	Third Division North	Mansfield	2–0	Chesterfield	Field Mill	16,759	+3
14	1954–55	30 March 1955	Third Division North	Chesterfield	4–1	Mansfield	Saltergate	6,772	+4
15	1955–56	5 November 1955	Third Division North	Mansfield	0–1	Chesterfield	Field Mill	8,375	+5
16	1955–56	31 March 1956	Third Division North	Chesterfield	2–1	Mansfield	Saltergate	15,138	+6
17	1956–57	25 December 1956	Third Division North	Chesterfield	1–0	Mansfield	Saltergate	11,107	+7
18	1956–57	8 April 1957	Third Division North	Mansfield	3–0	Chesterfield	Field Mill	8,746	+6
19	1957–58	30 November 1957	Third Division North	Mansfield	1–1	Chesterfield	Field Mill	12,575	+6
20	1957–58	12 April 1958	Third Division North	Chesterfield	1–4	Mansfield	Saltergate	12,279	+5
21	1958–59	20 September 1958	Third Division	Mansfield	2–1	Chesterfield	Field Mill	15,952	+4
22	1958–59	7 February 1959	Third Division	Chesterfield	3–1	Mansfield	Saltergate	10,120	+5
23	1959–60	28 November 1959	Third Division	Chesterfield	0–1	Mansfield	Saltergate	9,451	+4
24	1959–60	19 March 1960	Third Division	Mansfield	4–1	Chesterfield	Field Mill	11,122	+3
25	1961–62	23 September 1961	Fourth Division	Chesterfield	0–4	Mansfield	Saltergate	10,939	+2
26	1961–62	10 February 1962	Fourth Division	Mansfield	2–2	Chesterfield	Field Mill	8,373	+2
27	1962–63	17 September 1962	Fourth Division	Chesterfield	4–4	Mansfield	Saltergate	12,993	+2
28	1962–63	22 October 1962	Fourth Division	Mansfield	3–0	Chesterfield	Field Mill	16,679	+1
29	1970–71	2 January 1971	Third Division	Chesterfield	2–2	Mansfield	Saltergate	16,474	+1
30	1970–71	15 March 1971	Third Division	Mansfield	2–2	Chesterfield	Field Mill	13,181	+1
31	1971–72	18 September 1971	Third Division	Chesterfield	2–0	Mansfield	Saltergate	9,960	+2
32	1971–72	1 January 1972	Third Division	Mansfield	2–1	Chesterfield	Field Mill	8,331	+1
33	1975–76	26 December 1975	Third Division	Mansfield	0–1	Chesterfield	Field Mill	8,607	+2
34	1975–76	17 April 1976	Third Division	Chesterfield	1–2	Mansfield	Saltergate	10,614	+1
35	1976–77	27 December 1976	Third Division	Chesterfield	0–1	Mansfield	Saltergate	11,826	0
36	1976–77	11 April 1977	Third Division	Mansfield	2–1	Chesterfield	Field Mill	11,905	+1
37	1978–79	16 April 1979	Third Division	Chesterfield	1–0	Mansfield	Saltergate	4,931	0
38	1978–79	21 May 1979	Third Division	Mansfield	2–1	Chesterfield	Field Mill	4,159	+1
39	1979–80	18 August 1979	Third Division	Mansfield	3–2	Chesterfield	Field Mill	5,622	+2
40	1979–80	3 November 1979	Third Division	Chesterfield	2–0	Mansfield	Saltergate	4,364	+1
41	1983–84	26 December 1983	Fourth Division	Mansfield	0–1	Chesterfield	Field Mill	6,734	0
42	1983–84	21 April 1984	Fourth Division	Chesterfield	0–0	Mansfield	Saltergate	4,364	0
43	1984–85	26 December 1984	Fourth Division	Chesterfield	0–0	Mansfield	Saltergate	6,960	0
44	1984–85	6 April 1985	Fourth Division	Mansfield	0–0	Chesterfield	Field Mill	6,030	0'
45	1986–87	7 September 1986	Third Division	Mansfield	1–1	Chesterfield	Field Mill	4,797	0
46	1986–87	25 January 1987	Third Division	Chesterfield	0–1	Mansfield	Saltergate	4,080	+1
47	1987–88	29 August 1987	Third Division	Mansfield	0–1	Chesterfield	Field Mill	5,233	0
48	1987–88	1 January 1988	Third Division	Chesterfield	3–1	Mansfield	Saltergate	5,070	+1
49	1988–89	3 December 1988	Third Division	Chesterfield	1–3	Mansfield	Saltergate	4,236	0
50	1988–89	6 May 1989	Third Division	Mansfield	3–1	Chesterfield	Field Mill	4,779	+1
51	1991–92	31 August 1991	Fourth Division	Chesterfield	0–2	Mansfield	Saltergate	4,740	+2
52	1991–92	28 December 1991	Fourth Division	Mansfield	2–1	Chesterfield	Field Mill	6,514	+3
53	1993–94	31 August 1993	Third Division	Chesterfield	0–2	Mansfield	Saltergate	5,712	+4
54	1993–94	3 January 1994	Third Division	Mansfield	1–2	Chesterfield	Field Mill	4,272	+3
55	1994–95	27 August 1994	Third Division	Chesterfield	0–1	Mansfield	Saltergate	4,210	+4
56	1994–95	18 December 1994	Third Division	Mansfield	4–2	Chesterfield	Field Mill	3,519	+5
57	1994–95	14 May 1995	Play-offs	Mansfield	1–1	Chesterfield	Field Mill	6,582	+5
58	1994–95	17 May 1995	Play-offs	Chesterfield	5–2	Mansfield	Saltergate	8,165	+4
59	2000–01	16 September 2000	Third Division	Chesterfield	4–0	Mansfield	Saltergate	6,793	+3
60	2000–01	17 February 2001	Third Division	Mansfield	0–1	Chesterfield	Field Mill	7,899	+2
61	2002–03	24 August 2002	Second Division	Mansfield	0–2	Chesterfield	Field Mill	7,258	+1
62	2002–03	18 January 2003	Second Division	Chesterfield	1–2	Mansfield	Saltergate	6,813	+2
63	2007–08	15 September 2007	League Two	Mansfield	1–3	Chesterfield	Field Mill	4,514	+1
64	2007–08	20 December 2007	League Two	Chesterfield	2–0	Mansfield	Saltergate	6,300	0
65	2013–14	28 September 2013	League Two	Chesterfield	0–1	Mansfield	Proact Stadium	10,015	+1
66	2013–14	22 March 2014	League Two	Mansfield	0–0	Chesterfield	Field Mill	5,931	+1
67	2017–18	25 November 2017	League Two	Mansfield	2–2	Chesterfield	Field Mill	7,525	+1
68	2017–18	14 April 2018	League Two	Chesterfield	0–1	Mansfield	Proact Stadium	7,967	+2

Cup

#	Season	Date	Competition	Round	Home Team	Result	Away Team	Stadium	Attendance
1	1970–71	19 August 1970	League Cup	First round	Mansfield	6–2	Chesterfield	Field Mill	–
2	1971–72	18 August 1971	League Cup	First round	Chesterfield	0–0	Mansfield	Saltergate	–
3	1971–72	23 August 1971	League Cup	First round replay	Mansfield	0–5	Chesterfield	Field Mill	–
4	1973–74	29 August 1973	League Cup	First round	Chesterfield	1–1	Mansfield	Saltergate	–
5	1973–74	3 September 1973	League Cup	First round replay	Mansfield	0–1	Chesterfield	Field Mill	–
6	1988–89	10 December 1988	EFL Trophy	Preliminary	Chesterfield	2–1	Mansfield	Saltergate	2,640
7	1993–94	19 October 1993	EFL Trophy	First round	Mansfield	3–1	Chesterfield	Field Mill	2,291
8	2008–09	8 November 2008	FA Cup	First round	Chesterfield	3–1	Mansfield	Saltergate	6,612
9	2013–14	8 November 2013	EFL Trophy	Second round	Mansfield	0–1	Chesterfield	Field Mill	4,834
10	2026–27	10 November 2026	EFL Trophy	Group Stage	Mansfield	3–5	Chesterfield	FIeld Mill	5,233

== Individual Records ==
=== All-time top goalscorers ===
Stats since 1993–94 season.

Rank	Nation	Player	Club(s)	Years	League	FA Cup	League Cup	EFL Trophy	Overall
1	(England)	Steve Wilkinson	Mansfield Town	1989–1995	5	0	0	0	5
2	(England)	Phil Robinson	Chesterfield	1994–1996	3	0	0	0	3
3	(England)	Jack Lester	Chesterfield	2007–2013	2	0	0	0	2
3	(England)	Stewart Hadley	Mansfield Town	1993–1998	2	0	0	0	2
3	(England)	Nicky Law	Chesterfield	1993–1996	2	0	0	0	2
3	(England)	Ryan Williams	Mansfield Town	1995–1997, 2009–2011	0	0	0	0	2
3	(England)	Ryan Williams	Chesterfield	1999–2001	2	0	0	0	2
3	(Northern Ireland)	Jamie Ward	Chesterfield	2007–2009	1	1	0	0	2
3	(Scotland)	Jamie Winter	Chesterfield	2007–2009	0	2	0	0	2

=== All-time most appearances ===
Stats since 1993–94 season.

Rank	Nation	Player	Club(s)	Years	League	FA Cup	League Cup	EFL Trophy	Overall
1	(England)	Steve Payne	Chesterfield	1994–2004	4	0	0	0	4
1	(England)	Wayne Corden	Mansfield Town	2000–2005	4	0	0	0	4
1	(England)	Ian Evatt	Chesterfield	2003–2007	3	0	0	1	4
1	(England)	Sam Hird	Chesterfield	2008–2012	3	0	0	1	4
1	(England)	Rob Edwards	Chesterfield	2000–2003	4	0	0	0	4

== Team Records ==
=== Results ===
==== Biggest wins (5+ goals) ====
Winning margin	Result	Date	Competition
5	Mansfield 0–5 Chesterfield	23 August 1971	1971–72 Football League Cup

==== Most total goals in a match ====
Goals	Result	Date	Competition
8	Chesterfield 4–4 Mansfield	17 September 1962	1961–62 Fourth Division
8	Mansfield 6–2 Chesterfield	19 August 1970	1970–71 Football League Cup
7	Chesterfield 5–2 Mansfield	17 May 1995	1994–95 Third Division play-offs
6	Mansfield 4–2 Chesterfield	18 December 1994	1994–95 Third Division

==== Longest runs ====
===== Most consecutive wins =====
Games	Club	Period
5	Mansfield	6 May 1989 – 19 October 1993
4	Chesterfield	17 May 1995 – 24 August 2002

===== Most consecutive draws =====
Games	Period
4	21 April 1984 – 7 September 1986
3	2 January 1971 – 18 August 1971

===== Most consecutive matches without a draw =====
Games	Period
13	25 January 1987 – 18 December 1994
10	3 September 1973 – 26 December 1983
10	17 May 1995 – 8 November 2013

===== Longest undefeated runs =====
Games	Club	Period
9	Mansfield	28 November 1959 – 18 August 1971
6	Chesterfield	3 November 1979 – 7 September 1986

===== Most consecutive matches without conceding a goal =====
Games	Club	Period
5	Chesterfield	3 November 1979 – 6 April 1985

===== Most consecutive games scoring =====
Games	Club	Period
13	Mansfield	8 April 1957 – 15 March 1971
13	Mansfield	1 January 1988 – 17 May 1995
10	Chesterfield	18 December 1984 – 8 November 2008
7	Chesterfield	23 August 1971 – 17 April 1976
6	Chesterfield	11 April 1977 – 26 December 1983

=== Honours ===
Chesterfield	Competition	Mansfield
League
2	3rd Division/3rd Division North (Tier 3)	1
4	League Two/4th Division/3rd Division (Tier 4)	1
1	National League/Conference (Tier 5)	1
2	Midland League (defunct)	3
9	Aggregate	6
Cup
1	EFL Trophy	1
1	Anglo-Scottish Cup (defunct)	—
7	Derbyshire Senior Cup/Nottinghamshire Senior Cup	5
9	Aggregate	6
18	Total aggregate	12
