= Owen Williams (footballer, born 1873) =

English footballer

Personal information
- Full name: Owen Williams
- Date of birth: 1873
- Place of birth: Liverpool, England
- Position: Inside forward

Senior career*
Years	Team	Apps	(Gls)
1892–1893	Oldbury Town		
1893–1896	West Bromwich Albion	14	(7)
1896	Oldbury Town		
1897	Smethwick Centaur		
Total		14	(7)
- * Club domestic league appearances and goals

Owen Williams (1873 – after 1896) was an English footballer who played in the Football League for West Bromwich Albion.
