= 1888–89 Scottish Cup =

Scottish Cup
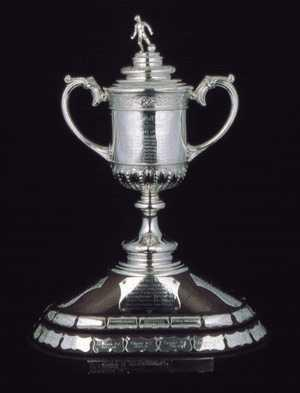
- The Scottish Cup trophy

Tournament details
- Country: Scotland
- Teams: 166

Final positions
- Champions: 3rd Lanark RV (first title)
- Runners-up: Celtic

Tournament statistics
- Matches played: 171
- Goals scored: 1,125 (6.58 per match)

The 1888–89 Scottish Cup was the 16th season of Scotland's most prestigious football knockout competition. 3rd Lanark RV beat Glasgow rivals Celtic (making their Cup début) 2–1 in a replayed final. The original match was won 3–0 by 3rd Lanark RV but the SFA ordered a replay due to the playing conditions.

== Calendar ==
Round	First match date	Fixtures			Clubs
Round	First match date	Original	Byes	Replays	Clubs
First Round	1 September 1888	79	6	6	166 → 85
Second Round	22 September 1888	39	7	5	85 → 46
Third Round	13 October 1888	21	4	4	46 → 26
Fourth Round	3 November 1888	13	0	1	26 → 13
Fifth Round	24 November 1888	5	3	5	13 → 8
Quarter-finals	15 December 1888	4	0	2	8 → 4
Semi-finals	12 January 1889	2	0	0	4 → 2
Final	2 February 1889	1	0	1	2 → 1

== Teams ==
All 166 teams entered the competition in the first round.

Ayrshire	Edinburghshire	Glasgow	Renfrewshire	Lanarkshire	Stirlingshire
Annbank; Ayr; Ayr Thistle; Beith; Dalry; Darnconner Britannia; Hurlford; Irvine; Kilbirnie; Kilmarnock; Kilmarnock Thistle; Lanemark; Lugar Boswell; Maybole; Rosebank; Stevenston Thistle; Stewarton Cunninghame; 2nd Ayrshire RV	Adventurers; Armadale; Bellstane Birds; Bo'ness; Broxburn; Broxburn Shamrock; Champfleurie; Erin Rovers (Bathgate); Heart of Midlothian; Hibernian; Leith Athletic; Leith Harp; Linlithgow Athletic; Mossend Swifts; Norton Park; St Bernard's; West Calder	Battlefield; Celtic; Clyde; Cowlairs; Glasgow University; Govan Athletic; Kelvinside Athletic; Linthouse; Maryhill; Northern; Partick Thistle; Pollokshields Athletic; Queen's Park; Rangers; Shettleston; Southern Athletic; Temperance Athletic; Thistle; United Abstainers Athletic; Whitefield; 3rd Lanark RV	Abercorn; Arthurlie; Carlton; Dykebar; Greenock Rangers; Johnstone Harp; Kilbarchan; Lochwinnoch; Morton; Neilston; Paisley Athletic; Pollokshaws; Pollokshaws Harp; Port Glasgow Athletic; Renfrew; St Mirren; Thornliebank; Woodvale; 1st Renfrew RV	Airdrieonians; Albion Rovers; Bellshill; Cambuslang; Cambuslang Hibernian; Carfin Shamrock; Clydesdale; Coatbridge; Hamilton Academical; Motherwell; Royal Albert; Rutherglen; Uddingston; Whifflet Shamrock; Wishaw Thistle	Alloa Athletic; Alva; Camelon; Campsie; Dunipace; East Stirlingshire; Falkirk; Gairdoch; Grangemouth; Kilsyth Wanderers; King's Park; Laurieston; Redding Athletic; Slamannan; Stenhousemuir; Vale of Bannock
Argyll	Dunbartonshire	Fife	Northern Counties	Perthshire	Southern Counties
Balaclava Rangers; Campbeltown Athletic; Lochgilphead; Oban	Bowling; Clydebank; Dumbarton; Dumbarton Athletic; Dumbarton Union; Jamestown; Kirkintilloch Athletic; Kirkintilloch Central; Methlan Park; Renton; Vale of Leven; Vale of Leven Hibernian; Vale of Leven Wanderers	Cowdenbeath; Dunfermline; Dunfermline Athletic; Kirkcaldy Wanderers; Lassodie; Townhill	Aberdeen; Aberdeen Rovers; Arbroath; Brechin; Broughty; Dundee East End; Dundee Harp; Dundee Our Boys; Forfar Athletic; Lindertis; Lochee; Montrose; Orion; Strathmore; Wanderers	Bridgend Athletic; Caledonian Rangers; Coupar Angus; Crieff; Dunblane; Erin Rovers (Perth); Fair City Athletic; Our Boys (Blairgowrie); St Johnstone; Vale of Atholl	Mid-Annandale; Moffat; Newton Stewart Athletic; Nithsdale; Queen of the South Wanderers; Thornhill; Vale of Nith; 5th Kirkcudbrightshire RV

== First round ==
=== Matches ===
==== Ayrshire district ====
1 September 1888	Lugar Boswell	0–5	Kilmarnock	Lugar
	Lyle; Forbes (x2); Russell; Campbell			Stadium: Rosebank Park

1 September 1888	Stewarton Cunninghame	4–3	Rosebank	Stewarton
				Stadium: Standalone Park

1 September 1888	Hurlford	7–0	Ayr	Hurlford
				Stadium: Station Park

1 September 1888	Lanemark	7–0	Stevenston Thistle	New Cumnock
				Stadium: Connel Park

1 September 1888	Kilbirnie	3–1	Dalry	Kilbirnie
				Stadium: Milton Park

1 September 1888	Beith	2–3	Irvine	Beith
				Stadium: Knockbuckle

8 September 1888	Annbank	5–1	Darnconner Britannia	Annbank
				Stadium: Pebble Park

Ayr Thistle	w/o	2nd Ayrshire RV

Maybole	w/o	Kilmarnock Thistle

==== Renfrewshire district ====
1st Renfrew RV received a bye to the second round.

1 September 1888	Pollokshaws	14–0	Carlton	Pollokshaws
				Stadium: Broom Park

1 September 1888	Johnstone Harp	4–5	Woodvale	Johnstone
				Stadium: Newfield Park

1 September 1888	Lochwinnoch	0–5	Dykebar	Lochwinnoch
				Stadium: Field Park

1 September 1888	Neilston	3–4	St Mirren	Neilston
				Stadium: Nether Kirton Park

1 September 1888	Renfrew	0–0	Arthurlie	Renfrew
				Stadium: Glebe Park

1 September 1888	Port Glasgow Athletic	3–7	Morton	Port Glasgow
	Hunter			Stadium: Clune Park

Kilbarchan	w/o	Abercorn

Paisley Athletic	w/o	Thornliebank

Greenock Rangers	w/o	Pollokshaws Harp

==== Dunbartonshire district ====
Vale of Leven received a bye to the second round.

1 September 1888	Renton	8–0	Bowling	Renton
				Stadium: Tontine Park

1 September 1888	Dumbarton	13–1	Kirkintilloch Central	Dumbarton
	Dewar (x2); Chapman (x3); Madden; Lapsley (x6); Own goal			Stadium: Boghead Park

1 September 1888	Jamestown	1–6	Vale of Leven Hibernian	Jamestown
				Stadium: Balloch Road

1 September 1888	Clydebank	3–4	Vale of Leven Wanderers	Clydebank
				Stadium: Hamilton Park

1 September 1888	Methlan Park	5–0	Kirkintilloch Athletic	Dumbarton
				Stadium: Upper Woodyard Park

1 September 1888	Dumbarton Athletic	15–0	Dumbarton Union	Dumbarton
				Stadium: St James' Park

==== Edinburghshire district ====
Broxburn received a bye to the second round.

1 September 1888	Mossend Swifts	2–1	Hibernian	West Calder
			McVey	Stadium: Mossend Park; Attendance: 2,000

1 September 1888	Armadale	12–0	Champfleurie	Armadale
				Stadium: Mayfield

1 September 1888	Bellstane Birds	2–3	Norton Park	Queensferry
				Stadium: Bird's Park

1 September 1888	St Bernard's	7–0	Leith Athletic	Edinburgh
				Stadium: Powderhall

1 September 1888	Linlithgow Athletic	2–6	Adventurers	Linlithgow
				Stadium: Captain's Park

1 September 1888	Broxburn Shamrock	3–2 (Void)	West Calder	Broxburn
				Stadium: Shamrock Park

1 September 1888	Erin Rovers (Bathgate)	6–0	Leith Harp	Bathgate
				Stadium: Boghead Park

1 September 1888	Bo'ness	0–1	Heart of Midlothian	Bo'ness
			Wood 45'	Stadium: Newtown Park

==== Fife district ====
1 September 1888	Cowdenbeath	3–1	Lassodie	Cowdenbeath
				Stadium: North End Park

1 September 1888	Kirkcaldy Wanderers	3–0	Townhill	Kirkcaldy
				Stadium: Newtown Park

Dunfermline Athletic	w/o	Dunfermline

==== Lanarkshire district ====
Uddingston received a bye to the second round.

1 September 1888	Carfin Shamrock	6–1	Whifflet Shamrock	Carfin
				Stadium: Byres Knowe Park

1 September 1888	Clydesdale	1–1	Rutherglen	Rutherglen
				Stadium: South Croft

1 September 1888	Wishaw Thistle	2–4	Cambuslang	Wishaw
				Stadium: Old Public Park

1 September 1888	Hamilton Academical	5–0	Airdrieonians	Hamilton
				Stadium: Douglas Park

1 September 1888	Cambuslang Hibernian	5–0	Coatbridge	Cambuslang
				Stadium: Westburn Park

1 September 1888	Motherwell	3–3	Royal Albert	Motherwell
				Stadium: Roman Road

Albion Rovers	w/o	Bellshill

==== Stirlingshire district ====
1 September 1888	Slamannan	5–3	Grangemouth	Slamannan
				Stadium: West Limerigg Park

1 September 1888	Vale of Bannock	3–2	Laurieston	Bannockburn
				Stadium: Viewvale

1 September 1888	King's Park	4–3	Alloa Athletic	Stirling
				Stadium: Forthbank Park

1 September 1888	Alva	6–2	Kilsyth Wanderers	Alva
				Stadium: East End Park

1 September 1888	East Stirlingshire	10–1	Stenhousemuir	Bainsford
				Stadium: Merchiston Park

1 September 1888	Campsie	5–1	Camelon	Lennoxtown
				Stadium: Lennox Park

1 September 1888	Falkirk	5–0	Dunipace	Falkirk
				Stadium: Brockville Park

Redding Athletic	w/o	Gairdoch

==== Northern Counties ====
Broughty received a bye to the second round.

1 September 1888	Dundee Our Boys	5–4	Dundee East End	Dundee
				Stadium: West Craigie Park

1 September 1888	Brechin	1–8	Montrose	Brechin
				Stadium: Montrose Street Park

1 September 1888	Aberdeen	3–4	Arbroath	Aberdeen
				Stadium: Chanonry Grounds

1 September 1888	Forfar Athletic	14–1	Lindertis	Forfar
				Stadium: Station Park

1 September 1888	Dundee Harp	4–3	Strathmore	Dundee
				Stadium: East Dock Street

8 September 1888	Orion	2–3	Lochee	Aberdeen
				Stadium: Central Park

Wanderers	w/o	Aberdeen Rovers

==== Perthshire district ====
1 September 1888	Dunblane	6–3	St Johnstone	Dunblane
				Stadium: Kippencross Park

1 September 1888	Crieff	10–2	Vale of Atholl	Crieff
				Stadium: Braehead Park

1 September 1888	Erin Rovers (Perth)	8–2	Blairgowrie Our Boys	Perth
				Stadium: St Catherine's Park

1 September 1888	Bridgend Athletic	1–6	Coupar Angus	Perth
				Stadium: Recreation Grounds

1 September 1888	Fair City Athletic	5–0	Caledonian Rangers	Perth
				Stadium: Balhousie Park

==== Argyll district ====
1 September 1888	Lochgilphead	15–1	Balaclava Rangers	Lochgilphead
				Stadium: Bank Park

Oban	w/o	Campbeltown Athletic

==== Southern Counties ====
1 September 1888	Queen of the South Wanderers	9–4	5th Kirkcudbrightshire RV	Dumfries
				Stadium: Cresswell Park

1 September 1888	Newton Stewart Athletic	13–0	Nithsdale	Newton Stewart
				Stadium: Holm Park

1 September 1888	Thornhill	2–2	Vale of Nith	Thornhill
				Stadium: Kirkbog Farm

Mid-Annandale	w/o	Moffat

==== Glasgow and District ====
Glasgow University received a bye to the second round.

1 September 1888	Rangers	4–2	Partick Thistle	Govan
	Wyllie; Sloane (x2); Gow			Stadium: Ibrox Park; Attendance: 3,000

1 September 1888	Linthouse	2–4	Clyde	Govan
				Stadium: Langlands Park

1 September 1888	Kelvinside Athletic	16–0	Govan Athletic	Glasgow
				Stadium: Kelburne Street

1 September 1888	Thistle	3–1	Maryhill	Glasgow
				Stadium: Beechwood Park

1 September 1888	Celtic	5–1	Shettleston	Glasgow
	O'Conner (x5)			Stadium: Celtic Park

1 September 1888	Battlefield	9–1	Southern Athletic	Langside
				Stadium: Mossfield Park

1 September 1888	United Abstainers Athletic	2–1	Pollokshields Athletic	Crosshill
				Stadium: Victoria Park

1 September 1888	Cowlairs	18–2	Temperance Athletic	Glasgow
				Stadium: Gourlay Park

8 September 1888	Northern	2–3	Queen's Park	Glasgow
				Stadium: Hyde Park

3rd Lanark RV	w/o	Whitefield

=== Replays ===
==== Renfrewshire district ====
8 September 1888	Arthurlie	3–1	Renfrew	Barrhead
				Stadium: Dunterlie Park

==== Edinburghshire district ====
8 September 1888	Broxburn Shamrock	Unplayed	West Calder	Uphall

==== Lanarkshire district ====
8 September 1888	Rutherglen	2–2	Clydesdale	Rutherglen
				Stadium: Lochgair

8 September 1888	Royal Albert	1–2	Motherwell	Larkhall
				Stadium: Raploch Park

==== Southern Counties ====
Vale of Nith	w/o	Thornhill

=== Second replay ===
==== Edinburghshire district ====
15 September 1888	West Calder	2–1	Broxburn Shamrock	West Calder
				Stadium: Burngrange Park

Notes

1. A-Match declared void after the referee failed to appear.
2. B-Match abandoned after 80 minutes. A replay was ordered.
3. C-Shamrock Park was unusable so Broxburn Shamrock had made arrangements to play their replayed tie with West Calder at Uphall. However, West Calder refused to play the tie away from Broxburn and protested to the SFA. It was decided to play the tie over at West Calder.
4. D-Both teams qualified for the second round.

== Second round ==
=== Matches ===
==== Ayrshire district ====
Irvine received a bye to the third round.

22 September 1888	Lanemark	2–0	Stewarton Cunninghame	New Cumnock
				Stadium: Connel Park

22 September 1888	2nd Ayrshire RV	4–4	Maybole	Newmilns
				Stadium: Hillhead Park

22 September 1888	Kilmarnock	1–3	Kilbirnie	Kilmarnock
	Brodie			Stadium: Rugby Park; Attendance: 5,000

29 September 1888	Annbank	5–4 (Void)	Hurlford	Annbank
				Stadium: Pebble Park

==== Renfrewshire district ====
22 September 1888	Woodvale	3–2 (Void)	1st Renfrew RV	Thornliebank
				Stadium: Deacon's Bank Park

22 September 1888	Morton	1–4	Abercorn	Greenock
				Stadium: Cappielow

22 September 1888	Dykebar	1–6	St Mirren	Paisley
				Stadium: Thistle Park; Attendance: 5,000

22 September 1888	Pollokshaws Harp	2–5	Thornliebank	Pollokshaws
				Stadium: Norwood Park

22 September 1888	Arthurlie	3–2	Pollokshaws	Barrhead
				Stadium: Dunterlie Park

==== Lanarkshire district ====
Cambuslang Hibernian received a bye to the third round.

22 September 1888	Uddingston	5–1	Clydesdale	Uddingston
				Stadium: Meadowbank

22 September 1888	Albion Rovers	9–1	Rutherglen	Coatbridge
				Stadium: Meadow Park

22 September 1888	Cambuslang	4–2	Carfin Shamrock	Cambuslang
				Stadium: Whitefield Park

22 September 1888	Motherwell	5–1	Hamilton Academical	Motherwell
				Stadium: Roman Road

==== Glasgow and District ====
Glasgow University received a bye to the third round.

22 September 1888	3rd Lanark RV	8–0	Kelvinside Athletic	Crosshill
				Stadium: Cathkin Park

22 September 1888	Battlefield	11–0	United Abstainers Athletic	Langside
				Stadium: Mossfield Park

22 September 1888	Celtic	8–0	Cowlairs	Glasgow
	Kelly; McCallum (x2); Groves; Dunbar (x3); Maley			Stadium: Celtic Park; Attendance: 6,500

22 September 1888	Queen's Park	6–0	Thistle	Crosshill
				Stadium: Hampden Park

22 September 1888	Clyde	2–2	Rangers	Glasgow
			Wyllie; Aird	Stadium: Barrowfield Park

==== Edinburghshire district ====
Armadale received a bye to the third round.

22 September 1888	Broxburn	9–3	Adventurers	Broxburn
				Stadium: Sports Park

22 September 1888	Heart of Midlothian	4–0	Erin Rovers (Bathgate)	Edinburgh
	Wright 35'; Reid 40', 80'; Sneddon 81'			Stadium: Tynecastle Park

22 September 1888	West Calder	1–6	Mossend Swifts	West Calder
				Stadium: Burngrange Park

29 September 1888	St Bernard's	3–1	Norton Park	Edinburgh
				Stadium: Powderhall

==== Fife district ====
Kirkaldy Wanderers received a bye to the third round.

22 September 1888	Cowdenbeath	2–4	Dunfermline Athletic	Cowdenbeath
				Stadium: North End Park

==== Dunbartonshire district ====
Dumbarton received a bye to the third round.

22 September 1888	Dumbarton Athletic	4–2	Vale of Leven	Dumbarton
				Stadium: St James' Park

22 September 1888	Vale of Leven Wanderers	2–10	Renton	Alexandria
				Stadium: Hill Street

22 September 1888	Vale of Leven Hibernian	1–3	Methlan Park	Alexandria
				Stadium: North Street Park

==== Stirlingshire district ====
22 September 1888	Slamannan	3–3	King's Park	Slamannan
				Stadium: Barnsmuir

22 September 1888	Alva	0–6	Campsie	Alva
				Stadium: East End Park

22 September 1888	East Stirlingshire	11–2	Vale of Bannock	Bainsford
				Stadium: Merchiston Park

22 September 1888	Falkirk	8–3	Gairdoch	Falkirk
				Stadium: Brockville Park

==== Northern Counties ====
22 September 1888	Broughty	2–4	Dundee Harp	Broughty Ferry
				Stadium: Forthill Park

22 September 1888	Forfar Athletic	6–5	Wanderers	Forfar
				Stadium: Station Park

22 September 1888	Arbroath	6–2	Montrose	Arbroath
				Stadium: Gayfield Park

22 September 1888	Dundee Our Boys	4–2	Lochee	Dundee
				Stadium: West Craigie Park

==== Argyll district ====
22 September 1888	Oban	4–2	Lochgilphead	Oban
				Stadium: Dalintart Park

==== Perthshire district ====
Dunblane received a bye to the third round.

22 September 1888	Coupar Angus	1–3	Erin Rovers (Perth)	Coupar Angus
				Stadium: Station Park

22 September 1888	Fair City Athletic	7–1	Crieff	Perth
				Stadium: Balhousie Park

==== Southern Counties ====
22 September 1888	Vale of Nith	3–1	Mid-Annandale	Dumfries
				Stadium: Milldamhead Park

22 September 1888	Queen of the South Wanderers	14–2	Newton Stewart Athletic	Dumfries
				Stadium: Cresswell Park

=== Replays ===
==== Ayrshire district ====
29 September 1888	Maybole	6–2	2nd Ayrshire RV	Maybole
				Stadium: Gardenrose Farm

6 October 1888	Hurlford	2–2	Annbank	Hurlford
				Stadium: Station Park

==== Renfrewshire district ====
1st Renfrew RV	w/o	Woodvale

==== Glasgow and District ====
29 September 1888	Rangers	0–3	Clyde	Glasgow
				Stadium: Ibrox Park; Attendance: 4,000

==== Stirlingshire district ====
29 September 1888	King's Park	13–1	Slamannan	Stirling
				Stadium: Forthbank Park

=== Second replay ===
==== Ayrshire district ====
13 October 1888	Annbank	2–3 (a.e.t.)	Hurlford	Annbank
				Stadium: Pebble Park

Notes

1. E-A protest by Hurlford was upheld and a replay was ordered.
2. F-Played at Thornliebank as Woodvale had lost its ground. 1st Renfrew RV protested that this was against the rules. The protest was upheld and a replay was ordered.

== Third round ==
=== Matches ===
==== Glasgow, Lanarkshire and Dunbartonshire district ====
Methlan Park received a bye to the fourth round.

13 October 1888	Motherwell	2–6	Dumbarton	Motherwell
				Stadium: Roman Road

13 October 1888	Cambuslang Hibernian	0–4	Clyde	Cambuslang
				Stadium: Westburn Park

13 October 1888	Renton	4–1	Cambuslang	Renton
				Stadium: Tontine Park

13 October 1888	Battlefield	1–3	Dumbarton Athletic	Langside
				Stadium: Mossfield Park

13 October 1888	Celtic	4–1	Albion Rovers	Glasgow
	Gallagher; Groves; Dunbar; Maley			Stadium: Celtic Park; Attendance: 600

13 October 1888	3rd Lanark RV	2–1 (Void)	Queen's Park	Crosshill
				Stadium: Cathkin Park

Uddingston	w/o	Glasgow University

==== East of Scotland and Fife ====
Dunfermline Athletic received a bye to the fourth round.

13 October 1888	Kirkcaldy Wanderers	1–2	St Bernard's	Kirkcaldy
				Stadium: Stark's Park

13 October 1888	Broxburn	2–2	Heart of Midlothian	Broxburn
	Marr; Russell		Reid; Wood	Stadium: Sports Field; Attendance: 2,000

13 October 1888	Mossend Swifts	5–2	Armadale	West Calder
				Stadium: Mossend Park

==== Stirlingshire and Argyll district ====
Oban received a bye to the fourth round.

13 October 1888	Falkirk	2–2	Campsie	Falkirk
				Stadium: Brockville Park

13 October 1888	East Stirlingshire	4–0	King's Park	Bainsford
				Stadium: Merchiston Park

==== Renfrewshire and Ayrshire district ====
13 October 1888	Lanemark	4–2	Maybole	New Cumnock
				Stadium: Connel Park

13 October 1888	Thornliebank	0–8	Abercorn	Thornliebank
				Stadium: Deacon's Bank Park

13 October 1888	Arthurlie	0–7	St Mirren	Barrhead
				Stadium: Dunterlie Park

13 October 1888	1st Renfrew RV	3–4	Kilbirnie	Greenock
				Stadium: Academy Park

20 October 1888	Hurlford	4–2	Irvine	Hurlford
				Stadium: Station Park

==== Southern Counties ====
13 October 1888	Queen of the South Wanderers	11–1	Vale of Nith	Dumfries
				Stadium: Cresswell Park

==== Northern Counties ====
Fair City Athletic received a bye to the fourth round.

13 October 1888	Dunblane	4–4	Erin Rovers (Perth)	Dunblane
				Stadium: Kippencross Park

13 October 1888	Forfar Athletic	1–2	Arbroath	Forfar
				Stadium: Station Park

13 October 1888	Dundee Our Boys	2–1	Dundee Harp	Dundee
				Stadium: West Craigie Park

=== Replays ===
==== Glasgow, Lanarkshire and Dunbartonshire district ====
27 October 1888	3rd Lanark RV	4–2	Queen's Park	Crosshill
				Stadium: Cathkin Park

==== East of Scotland and Fife ====
20 October 1888	Heart of Midlothian	2–0	Broxburn	Edinburgh
	Henderson; Wright			Stadium: Tynecastle Park; Attendance: 2,500

==== Stirlingshire and Argyll district ====
20 October 1888	Campsie	2–2	Falkirk	Lennoxtown
				Stadium: Lennox Park

==== Northern Counties ====
20 October 1888	Erin Rovers (Perth)	0–6	Dunblane	Perth
				Stadium: St Catherine's Park

Notes

1. G-A protest by Queen's Park was upheld and a replay was ordered.
2. H-Both teams qualified for the fourth round.

== Fourth round ==
=== Matches ===
3 November 1888	Campsie	3–1	Heart of Midlothian	Lennoxtown
	McVicar; Kennedy; Dempster		Sneddon	Stadium: Lennox Park; Attendance: 800

3 November 1888	Abercorn	11–1	Dundee Our Boys	Paisley
				Stadium: Blackstoun Park

3 November 1888	3rd Lanark RV	7–1	Hurlford	Crosshill
				Stadium: Cathkin Park

3 November 1888	Fair City Athletic	1–3	Arbroath	Perth
				Stadium: Balhousie Park

3 November 1888	St Bernard's	1–4	Celtic	Edinburgh
			McCallum; Groves (x2); Maley	Stadium: Powderhall; Attendance: 6,000

3 November 1888	Oban	0–6	Clyde	Oban
				Stadium: Dalintart Park

3 November 1888	Queen of the South Wanderers	10–2	Falkirk	Dumfries
				Stadium: Cresswell Park

3 November 1888	Uddingston	1–4	Mossend Swifts	Uddingston
				Stadium: Meadowbank

3 November 1888	Lanemark	0–8	Renton	New Cumnock
				Stadium: Connel Park

3 November 1888	Dunblane	4–4	East Stirlingshire	Dunblane
				Stadium: Kippencross Park

3 November 1888	Kilbirnie	1–6	St Mirren	Kilbirnie
				Stadium: Parkfoot

3 November 1888	Dumbarton	9–0	Methlan Park	Dumbarton
	Keir; Bell (x3); Chapman; Aitken			Stadium: Boghead Park

Dumbarton Athletic	w/o	Dunfermline Athletic

=== Replay ===
10 November 1888	East Stirlingshire	4–0	Dunblane	Bainsford
				Stadium: Merchiston Park

== Fifth round ==
Campsie, Dumbarton Athletic and East Stirlingshire each received a bye to the quarter-finals.

=== Matches ===
24 November 1888	Arbroath	3–3	Renton	Arbroath
				Stadium: Gayfield Park

24 November 1888	3rd Lanark RV	5–4 (Void)	Abercorn	Crosshill
				Stadium: Cathkin Park

24 November 1888	St Mirren	3–1	Queen of the South Wanderers	Paisley
	Johnstone; R. Brandon; Brown			Stadium: Westmarch

24 November 1888	Celtic	0–1 (Void)	Clyde	Glasgow
				Stadium: Celtic Park

1 December 1888	Dumbarton	3–1	Mossend Swifts	Dumbarton
	Dewar; Bell; Madden			Stadium: Boghead Park

=== Replays ===
1 December 1888	Renton	4–0	Arbroath	Renton
				Stadium: Tontine Park

8 December 1888	3rd Lanark RV	2–2	Abercorn	Crosshill
				Stadium: Cathkin Park

8 December 1888	Celtic	9–2	Clyde	Glasgow
	McLaren (x2); Groves (x4); Maley (x3)			Stadium: Celtic Park; Attendance: 9,000

=== Second replay ===
15 December 1888	Abercorn	2–2	3rd Lanark RV	Paisley
				Stadium: Blackstoun Park

=== Third replay ===
22 December 1888	Abercorn	1–3	3rd Lanark RV	Govan
				Stadium: Ibrox Park

Notes

1. I-A protest by Abercorn was upheld and a replay was ordered.
2. J-A protest by Celtic was upheld and a replay was ordered.

== Quarter-finals ==
=== Matches ===
15 December 1888	Dumbarton Athletic	1–2	Renton	Dumbarton
				Stadium: St James' Park

15 December 1888	Dumbarton	2–2	St Mirren	Dumbarton
	Bell (x2)		Brown; J. Johnston	Stadium: Boghead Park

15 December 1888	East Stirlingshire	1–2	Celtic	Bainsford
			McCallum (x2)	Stadium: Merchiston Park; Attendance: 3,000

29 December 1888	3rd Lanark RV	6–1	Campsie	Crosshill
				Stadium: Cathkin Park

=== Replay ===
22 December 1888	St Mirren	2–2	Dumbarton	Paisley
	Brown; Stewart (o.g.)		Dewar; Lapsley	Stadium: Westmarch; Attendance: 6,000

=== Second replay ===
29 December 1888	Dumbarton	3–1	St Mirren	Govan
	Bell; Aitken (x2)		Paterson	Stadium: Ibrox Park; Attendance: 7,000

== Semi-finals ==
=== Matches ===
12 January 1889	Dumbarton	1–4	Celtic	Dumbarton
	Madden		Dunbar (x2); Groves (x2)	Stadium: Boghead Park; Attendance: 6,000

12 January 1889	3rd Lanark RV	2–0	Renton	Crosshill
				Stadium: Cathkin Park

== Final ==
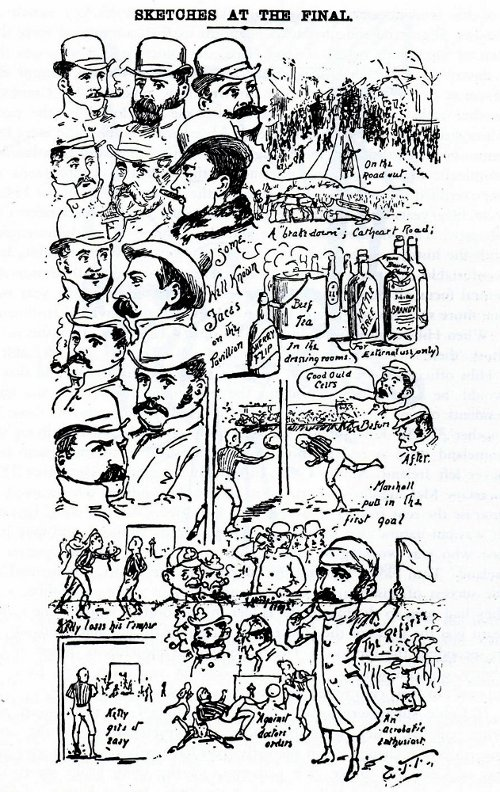
Cartoon illustrating the 1889 Scottish Cup Final (The Scottish Referee, Monday 4 February 1889)

=== Original ===
2 February 1889
15:00

3rd Lanark RV	3–0 (Void)	Celtic

Hampden Park, Crosshill

=== Replay ===
9 February 1889
15:00

3rd Lanark RV	2–1	Celtic
		McCallum

Hampden Park, Crosshill
Attendance: 13,000
