= Godsell =

Godsell is a surname. Notable people with the surname include:

- Andrew Godsell (born 1964), British writer
- Bobby Godsell (born 1952), South African businessman
- Jack Godsell (born 1924), Scottish footballer
- Richard Godsell (1880–1954), English cricketer
- Sean Godsell (born 1960), Australian footballer and architect
- Vanda Godsell (1922–1990), English actress
