= Tillicoultry F.C. =

Association football club in Scotland

Tillicoultry
- Full name: Tillicoultry Football Club
- Nickname(s): Tilly, the Tilly Lads
- Founded: 1884
- Dissolved: 1893
- Ground: Ochilview Park
- Captain: John Paterson
- President: John Dyson
- Match Secretary: John Cleminson, George Alexander
Home colours

Tillicoultry Football Club was a football club based in Tillicoultry, Clackmannanshire.

== History ==
The earliest recorded match for the club is in January 1885, at home to the Vale of Devon club, the same day as the village's rugby club played in Denny; the rugby club had been founded in March 1883. The rugby club had stopped playing by the start of the 1886–87 season, and at least one rugby player - John Millar - had switched to playing for the association side.

The first competitive football the club played was in a competition arranged by the Sauchie Colliery band in 1886–87; Tillicoultry reached the final, at Gaberston Park in Alloa, which it lost 2–1 to Clackmannan. The success of the tournament (the final having a crowd of over 2,000) encouraged clubs in the county to found a charity tournament, which functioned as a county tournament, Clackmannanshire being too small to warrant a separate association. Tillicoultry gained its biggest win in 1886–87, 16–0 over Coalsnaughton of Longrigg, although it only won one more tie in the competition, against the same opponents in 1887–88.

In 1888–89 the club entered the Fife Cup for the first time, and beat Townhill at Ochilview Park in its first match in the competition. That put the club in the semi-final, where it lost 4–0 to Cowdenbeath at Lady's Mill, but its good form perhaps persuaded the club to turn senior, and it joined the Scottish Football Association in August 1889.

It entered the 1889–90 Scottish Cup and was drawn at home to Falkirk. The club however switched the tie to Falkirk for "the lift they would get financially, and in this they were not disappointed"; although the Tilly Lads were "a likely set of fellows", their play was "plenty of hard work and no science", and the Bairns won 11–1. The move to senior football was optimistic - the Falkirk second XI was good enough to beat Tilly's first 3–0 towards the end of the season. The club, recognizing this, withdrew from the Fife Cup, and focussed on more local football, although as a member of the Scottish FA it continued to enter the Scottish Cup.

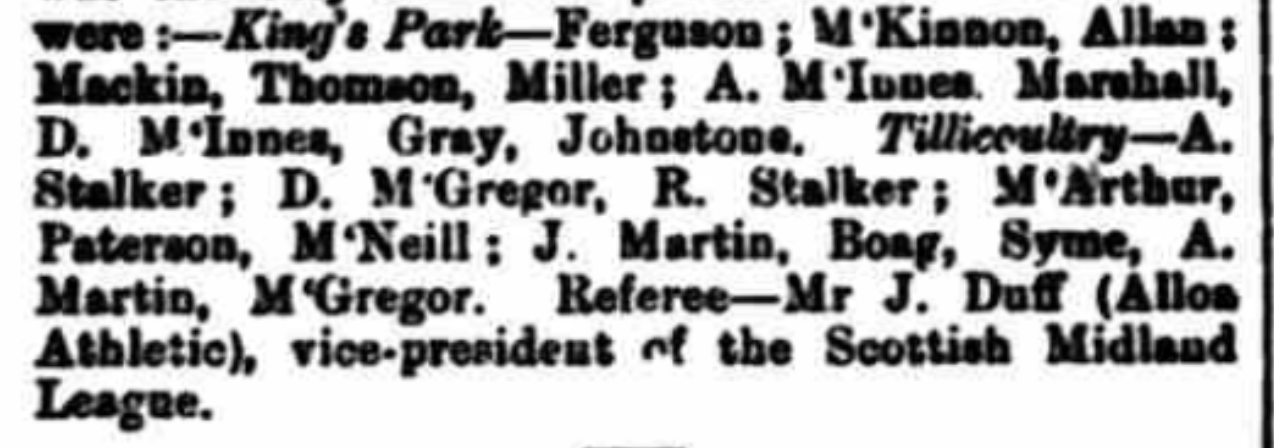
1892–93 Scottish Cup 1st Qualifying Round, King's Park v Tillicoultry sides, Bridge of Allan Reporter, 10 September 1892

Tillicoultry's last appearance in the first round proper of the national competition was in 1890–91, a 6–1 defeat at home to Dalmuir Thistle. From the following season, the Scottish FA introduced qualifying rounds, but the club scratched to Falkirk in the first qualifying round in 1891–92 and lost 9–1 at King's Park in the first qualifying round in 1892–93; Tillicoultry equalized an early K.P. goal but was 3–1 down by half-time, and was faced with a strong wind in the second-half. Nevertheless, the Tilly Lads "took their defeat in a good British spirit, and were well satisfied to know that their conquerors were the stronger". Three of the side - goalkeeper Stalker and the brothers M'Gregor - had played in the Sauchie badge final five years before.

The club was effectively dead by 1893, season ticket holders and members not paying their subscriptions, but an XI was brought together for the Clackmannanshire Charity Cup in April 1893, including the McGregors, Miller, Martin, Boag, and Syme from the Cup side. Despite being under "special training", the Tilly Lads went down 7–1 to Alva. Bowing to the inevitable pressures of Scottish League football squeezing the smaller sides out, Tillicoultry was struck from the Scottish FA roll in August 1893.

== Colours ==
The club originally played in blue jerseys and white knickers. In 1891 the club changed to scarlet and blue striped jerseys.

== Ground ==
The club's first recorded ground is Beechwood Park, where it played until the 1888–89 season. The club then moved to Ochilview Park, not to be confused with Ochilview.
