= Dalmuir Thistle F.C. =

Association football club in Dunbartonshire, Scotland

Dalmuir Thistle
- Full name: Dalmuir Thistle F.C.
- Nickname: the Thistle
- Founded: 1877
- Dissolved: 1895
- Ground: Castle Park
- Hon. Secretary: T. Wilson, Robert Sanders, J. Scott
- Match Secretary: John McGregor, W. Cross, James Rae
to 1892 colours	from 1892 colours

Dalmuir Thistle F.C. was a 19th-century association football club from Dalmuir, Clydebank, Dunbartonshire.

== History ==
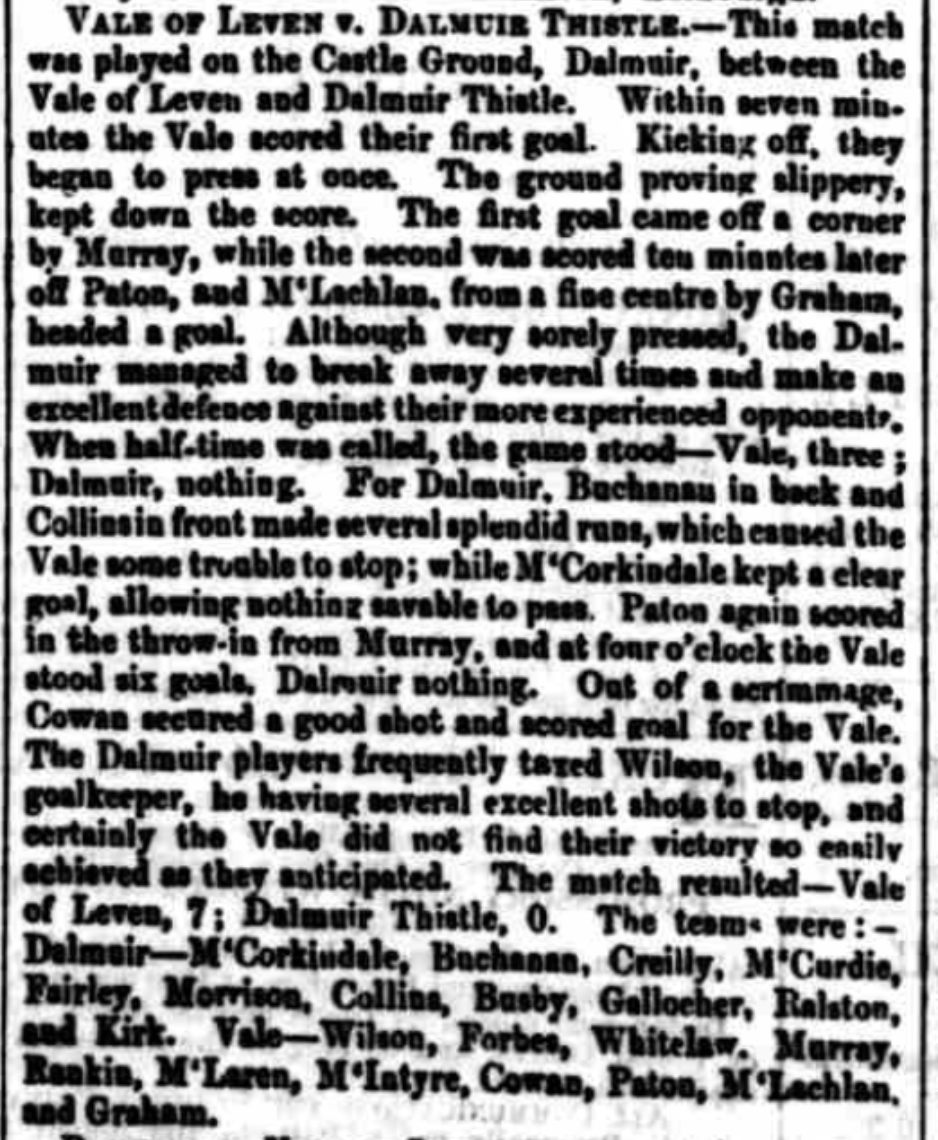
1887–88 Dunbartonshire Consolation Cup Third Round, Vale of Leven 7–0 Dalmuir Thistle, Dumbarton Herald, 14 December 1887

The club was reputed to have been founded in 1877, but the first recorded matches for the club do not appear until 1884, the earliest being a 6–2 defeat to Vale of Leven Wanderers in October, just before the club's first appearance in the Dunbartonshire Cup (an 8–0 defeat to Union). The club was made up mostly of workers at the Singer foundry in Kilbowie, and many did "double duty" by playing for the foundry in works competitions.

On 10 October 1885, the Thistle was hosting Glen Rangers in a friendly. One of the Thistle's players, Thomas Anderson, who worked at Singer, was kneed in the abdomen by M'Aulay of the Rangers, and collapsed to the ground; he did not receive immediate treatment because those present thought he was faking an injury. He died of his injuries the following day. The club therefore dissolved, but was revived in time for the 1886–87 season.

The Thistle's only win in the Dunbartonshire Cup in the 1880s came in the Consolation Cup in 1887–88, against the obscure Duntocher Union, and the club's status as second-tier was confirmed by a 7–0 defeat to Vale of Leven in the next round.

Despite this lack of success, the Thistle joined the Scottish Football Association in August 1890, just in time to play in the 1890–91 Scottish Cup, the last year in which all entrants started in the first round proper. The club won 6–1 at Tillicoultry in the first round, and in the second lost 7–5 at home to Cowdenbeath in "boisterous" weather; Cowdenbeath took the lead inside three minutes and was quickly 2–0 up, and 5–4 up at half-time. Thistle brought the score level but the much heavier Cowdenbeath showed more stamina to win through.

Dalmuir at least won in the main rounds of the Dunbartonshire Cup for the first time, 8–1 at Bowling, that season, but, the following season, the Scottish Football Association brought in qualifying rounds, and the Thistle never won through to the first round proper of the national competition again. In 1891–92 the club was drawn at home to the original Aberdeen in the fourth and final preliminary stage, but sold home advantage. The decision proved costly as Thistle lost 2–1, having been ahead at half-time.

The club's best run in the county competition was in 1893–94, and that was only because of the decimation of clubs in the area due to the introduction of the Scottish League and professionalism; it gained a bye and beat Kirkintilloch Athletic 2–1, putting it into the semi-final, which ended with defeat to Duntocher Harp.

The Thistle was forced to close up shop in August 1895, "showing the effect professionalism has had in the provinces". By this time Dunbartonshire was only down to three senior clubs which were not in the Scottish League.

== Colours ==
The club originally played in dark blue. In 1892 it changed to black and white vertically striped shirts, blue knickers

== Ground ==
The club's home ground was Castle Park, notable for having a hedge and tree along its touchlines. After the club's demise the ground was taken over by Clydebank United.

== Notable players ==
- Jimmy Collins, who started his career as outside-right for the Thistle, and went on to play in the Football League for Newcastle United and Nottingham Forest
