= Townhill F.C. =

Scottish football club

Townhill
- Nickname: the Miners
- Founded: 1885
- Dissolved: 1895
- Ground: Cairncubie Park
- Hon. Secretary: John F. Graham
- Match Secretary: Alexander Allan
- Captain: J. Duncan
Home colours

Townhill F.C. was an association football club from the village of Townhill, Fife, which played in the Scottish Cup twice in the 19th century.

== History ==
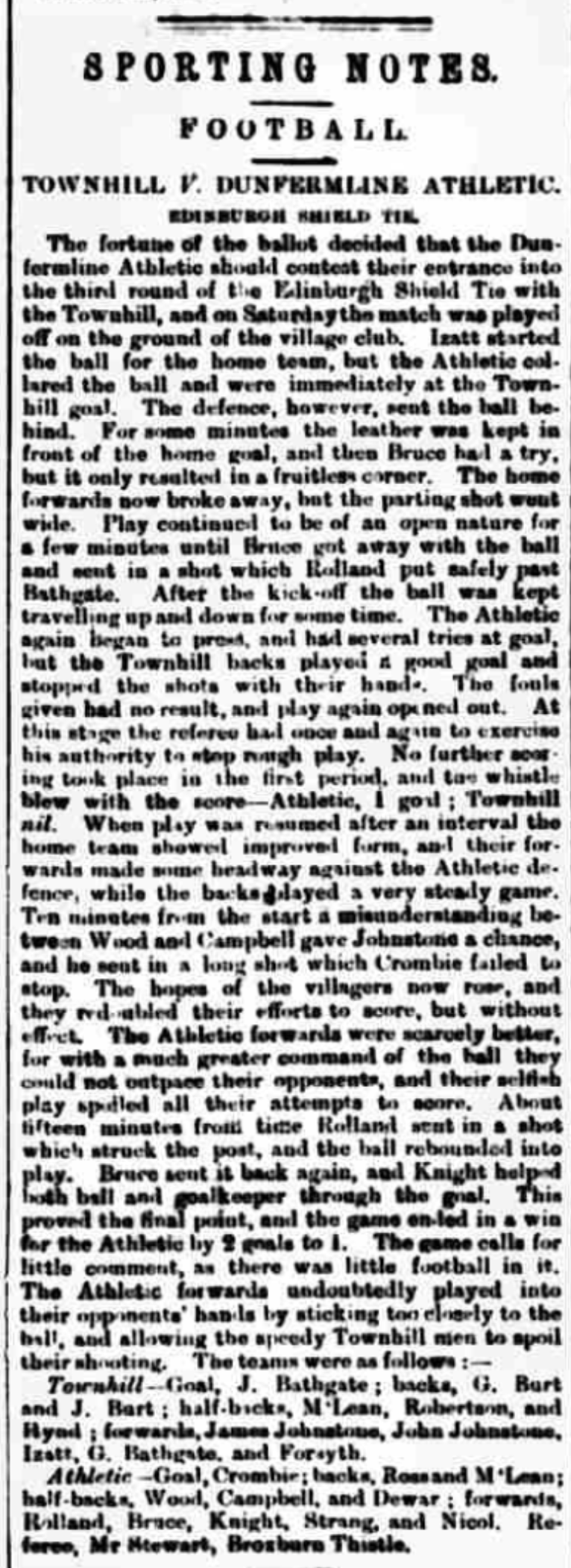
1887–88 Edinburgh Shield 2nd Round, Townhill 1–2 Dunfermline Athletic, Dunfermline Journal, 15 October 1887

The first recorded match for the club was a defeat to a scratch team from Dunfermline in May 1885. It did not play competitive football until 1886–87, when it entered the Fife Cup, and lost to Strathforth in the first round. However the club only had one other defeat in the season, and with 10 wins and a credit balance of £2, considered "very satisfactory", the club resolved to enter the Edinburgh Shield as well the following season.

Indeed, the club picked up its first competitive win in that competition in 1887–88, coming from behind to beat Lumphinnans 3–1 away from home, but lost to Dunfermline Athletic in the next round. It followed that win with a 5–0 revenge victory over Strathforth in the first round of the King Cup, albeit that was the only win the club had in four entries to that competition; Strathforth protested in vain against the fourth goal, and one of its players quit the match in protest at its being given.

Despite a general lack of success, Townhill joined the Scottish Football Association in August 1888, and entered the 1888–89 Scottish Cup. The move to senior football was a qualified success, as the club lost 3–0 at Kirkcaldy Wanderers in the first round of the Scottish Cup - the club walking off in protest at the third goal being given, but, as 86 minutes had been played, the players went back onto the pitch to avoid further sanction - and also lost its only ties in the Fife and Edinburgh competitions, but it did get to the final of the Dunfermline Charity Cup, where it lost 3–2 to Cowdenbeath.

The club did not renew its Scottish FA subscription and only lasted one more season playing at a senior level, although it did beat Blairadam 5–0 in the Fife Cup, and got as far as the semi-final, where the club again failed to get past Cowdenbeath.

The club had an on-off existence over the next few years, mostly playing at a Junior level, but it did return to senior level in 1894–95. It lost in the first Scottish Cup qualifying round to Cowdenbeath, and to Lochgelly United in its first Edinburgh Shield tie, but did get past St Andrews University in the county cup, after a 4–4 draw which was "the best played on Station Park this year", to reach the semi-final. At that stage Townhill lost to eventual winners Clackmannan in a replay, 4–2, after twice taking the lead, and the club was finally wound up in August 1895.

== Colours ==
The club wore white shirts and blue serge knickers.

== Ground ==
The club's ground was at Cairncubie Park.
