= Kirkcaldy F.C. =

Scottish association football club, 1881–1900

Kirkcaldy
- Full name: Kirkcaldy Football Club
- Nickname: the Wanderers
- Founded: 1881
- Dissolved: 1900
- Ground: Newtown Park
1881–1889 colours	1889–1900 colours

Kirkcaldy Football Club was a football club from Kirkcaldy in Scotland.

== History ==
The club was founded as Kirkcaldy Wanderers in 1881, playing its first match against Rossend of Burntisland on 12 November 1881, after practising for several weeks on "Mr Stark's park". It was the first association club in the town, even though Scottish Cup ties had been played there before, as a neutral venue in 1876–77 for ties involving St Clement's of Dundee.

In April 1882, the Fifeshire Football Association was established, and the first Fife Cup took place in 1882–83. The Wanderers was a founder member and played in the initial competition, losing to Burntisland Thistle in the first round 3–2.

The club was confident enough to try out more competitive competition, and played in the Edinburgh Shield for the first time in 1883–84. In its first entry the club won two ties - the first a revenge 2–1 victory at Burntisland Thistle - and lost at home to Heart of Midlothian in the third round.

=== Change to Kirkcaldy ===
A rugby football club, called Kirkcaldy Football Club, had existed in the town for some years, and before the 1885–86 season the Wanderers amalgamated with the rugby side, which enabled it to play at the rugby side's Newtown Park. As a result, the club changed its name simply to Kirkcaldy, although the Wanderers name was still occasionally used by the media as a distinguishing mark, and it was also applied to the club's second XI. The two organizations held joint annual general meetings and celebrations, and shared an honorary secretary in Alex. Ingram.

=== Senior club ===
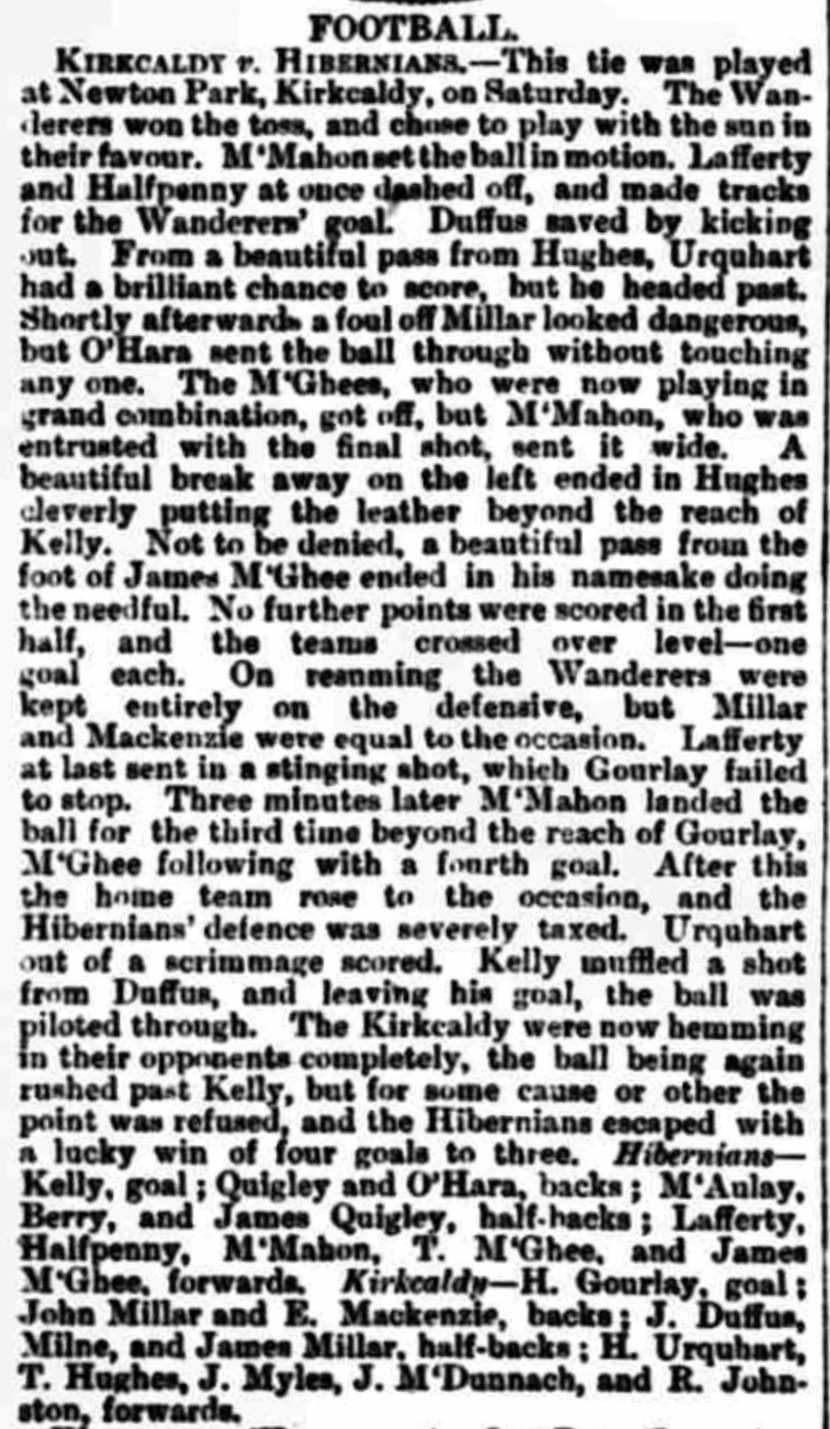
1890–91 Scottish Cup 1st Round, Kirkcaldy 3–4 Hibernian, Fifeshire Journal, 11 September 1890

The club was the first from the town to turn senior, by joining the Scottish Football Association in 1888. It entered the Scottish Cup for the first time in 1888–89, and reached the third round, after a 3–0 win over Townhill - 500 spectators turning up to watch; Townhill walked off in protest at the third goal being given, but, on checking how long was remaining (4 minutes), returned to finish off the match - and a bye.

The club was given no chance against St Bernards in the third round, but the Saints only just squeezed home 2–1, Kirkcaldy having a goal disallowed for a prior foul. It was the club's best run in the competition, never making the main rounds after the introduction of qualifying rounds. Its last match in the main section was another tight run affair against a top Edinburgh side, a 4–3 defeat at home to Hibernian in 1890–91.

After twice beating Burntisland Thistle in the 1888–89 Fifeshire Cup (the first victory being annulled because of "non-registration of colours"), the club withdrew from the competition, "as they consider - and perhaps rightly, too - that they have not been fairly dealt with by the Association". The club did not take part in the Fifeshire for the next three seasons, its competitive football coming in the Scottish Cup and the East of Scotland Shield.

This may have been a mistake, as in that period Raith Rovers, a younger club in the town, turned senior and continued its entries to the local cup. The switch came in the 1889–90 season; at the start, Kirkcaldy handily beat the Rovers in the Edinburgh Shield, but, at the turn of the year, the Rovers beat the Wanderers for the first time in a friendly match. In 1891–92 the Rovers became the first club from Kirkcaldy to win the Fifeshire Cup, and Kirkcaldy never recovered its local superiority. Indeed, in 1892–93, when Kirkcaldy entered the Fifeshire Cup once more, it lost to Raith Rovers in the first round, the tie taking place three times (because of protests as to pitch conditions), and Raith Rovers winning three times - the official tie ending 7–2.

=== Local cup finals ===
The club entered three competitions - the Fifeshire Cup, the King Cup (for eastern sides outside Edinburgh), and the Edinburgh/East of Scotland Shield - over most of its existence. The standard in the last competition was far too high for the club, suffering a record 13–0 defeat to Leith Athletic in 1890–91 (albeit after beating Raith Rovers 3–0 in the second round, in front of "several thousand" at Newtown Park), but the club did reach the fifth round in 1891–92, albeit thanks to two byes, where it lost to Armadale 10–2. Perhaps recalling the earlier Burntisland protest, the Wanderers protested against Armadale for two players not wearing official club colours, but this hapless attempt at reinstatement was dismissed.

The club reached the semi-final of the King Cup in its first entry in 1887–88, but went one better in 1893–94, reaching the final at East End Park in Dunfermline. The club however lost 6–2 to a strong Cowdenbeath side, having been 2–0 up as late as the 67th minute, but collapsing in the face of the Miners' "forcible tactics" and "remarkable stamina".

Kirkcaldy's only final at county level came in 1897–98, in the Wemyss Cup for Fifeshire clubs, by which time the number of senior Fifeshire clubs had fallen to fewer than a dozen clubs, and the Wemyss Cup only had 6 entries. Despite having home advantage, Kirkcaldy was beaten 3–0 by Raith Rovers, albeit conceding twice in the second half when down to ten men.

=== Looking for a league ===
With Raith Rovers joining the Midland League in 1891–92, and the Scottish FA introducing qualifying rounds for the Scottish Cup, Kirkcaldy tried to keep up with regular football by joining the Eastern Alliance. After the club had played six matches, it withdrew.

The club found a more regular berth in the Central Football League, which was founded in 1895–96, but only lasted two seasons in its initial incarnation. Even in that small competition, the club could not fulfil its fixtures - in 1896–97 it only played three matches, winning two and losing one to Hearts of Beath, going from 2–0 up to 3–2 down in three second-half minutes.

The club's end was hastened by the loss of its ground, with permission being granted for building houses on it in late 1899. The last recorded game for the club was against Polton Vale in October 1899; Kirkcaldy had lost several players and had to make up the side with players from the local Bluebell side, and "not more than a dozen" paid for admission. The club had the consolation of a 2–0 win - its first of the season.

The final symbolic blow was the death of the club's long-standing President, David Blewes, in June 1900. Kirkcaldy was in effect replaced as the second senior club in the town by Kirkcaldy United.

== Colours ==
The club originally played in navy blue jerseys with white knickers. In 1889 the club registered blue and white vertical striped shirts with white knickers, which remained its colours for the rest of its existence, but it may have been wearing those colours from the previous season, given Burntisland Thistle protested that the Wanderers were not wearing their navy blue in the 1888–89 Fifeshire Cup.

== Grounds ==
The club played originally at Stark's Park, later the home of Raith Rovers. From 1885 the club played at Newtown Park, the first game being a 2–1 defeat to Lochleven Rangers. A grandstand was built on the north side of the ground in time for the 1888 Scottish Cup tie with St Bernards.

== Notable players ==
- John McBean and Peter Connolly, who left to join Arsenal in the late 1880s
