= Lassodie =

Coordinates: 56°07′09″N 3°24′32″W

Lassodie: Lassodie
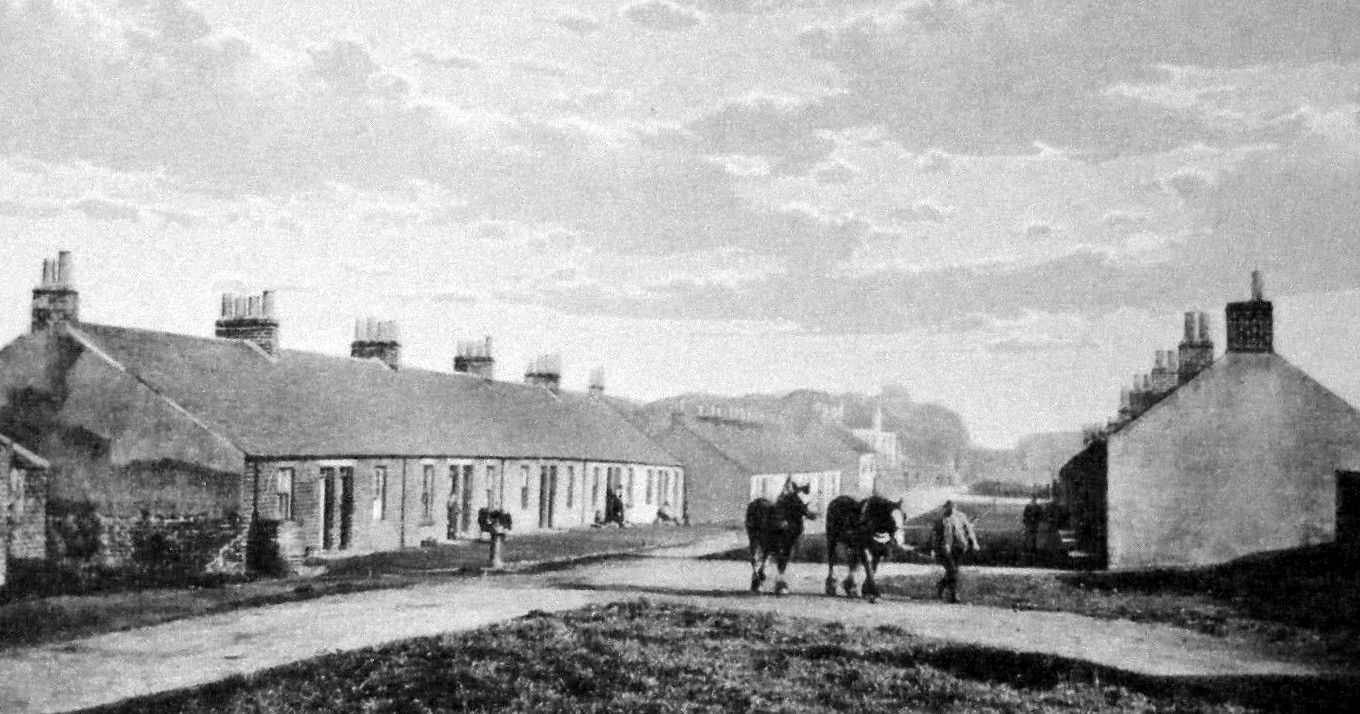
- New Rows, Lassodie, Fifeshire

- Location within Fife
- Population: 1,425 (1901)
- Civil parish: Beath
- Council area: Fife
- Shire county: Fife
- Country: Scotland
- Sovereign state: United Kingdom

Lassodie is an abandoned settlement located two miles south-west of Kelty, between Dunfermline and Cowdenbeath, in Fife.

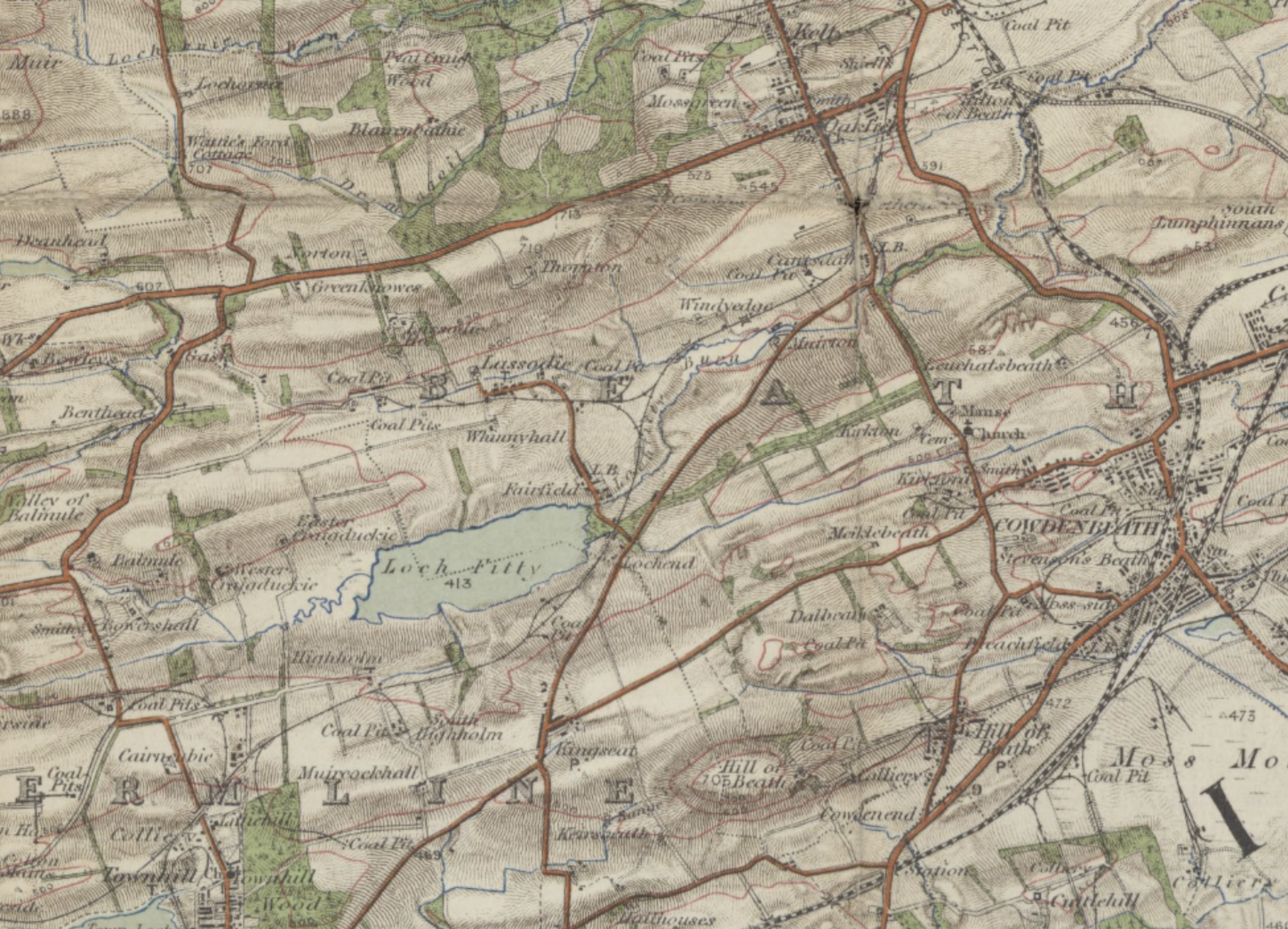
Lassodie and Fairfield, in relation to Loch Fitty and Cowdenbeath

== History ==
The name Lassodie was a collective for three settlements, named Old Rows, New Rows (or Parley), and Fairfield, all lying on a road from Kingseat to a series of mines. The name derives from the Scots Gaelic lios aodann, meaning "garden on the brow of a hill".

The earliest known record of the name is as "Lassody", describing a tower in the Blaeu Atlas of Scotland of 1654. The first known use of the area was as the site of a mill in the 18th century, and then as a farm, known as Braehead, belonging to the Dewar family, who held the Lairdship of Lassodie.

The right to collect coal was leased from 1825 at the latest, and pit mining is known to have taken place in the area from 1856. In 1860, Messrs. Thomas Spowart & Company, Ltd. took a lease over the minerals of the estate. Several hundred men were employed and the village (with a school) erected in short order. The village was difficult to find, being 6 miles from the nearest railway station, and offering an appearance of "a row or two and a farm house" (Lassodie House, the home of the laird) from a distance.

However, in May 1931, the company closed the mines, and ordered the miners - whose conditions of employment contained a requirement to live in the village houses - to leave within 14 days. A handful of people stayed behind, living without street lighting or sanitary facilities, until on 15 October 1944 the remaining villagers agreed to leave for Weir houses in Kelty and Halbeath.

The remains of the village were almost completely destroyed in the 1960s for the creation of the St Ninians Colliery open cast mine. The last building remaining is Loch Fitty Cottage, a former shop and stable, which was saved from demolition by being on the B912 road.

== Demography ==
A census from 1881 shows Lassodie had a population of 808 individuals; by 1901, it had risen to 1,425. After the closure of the mines, few people remained behind; by 1944, the population was 203.

== Facilities ==
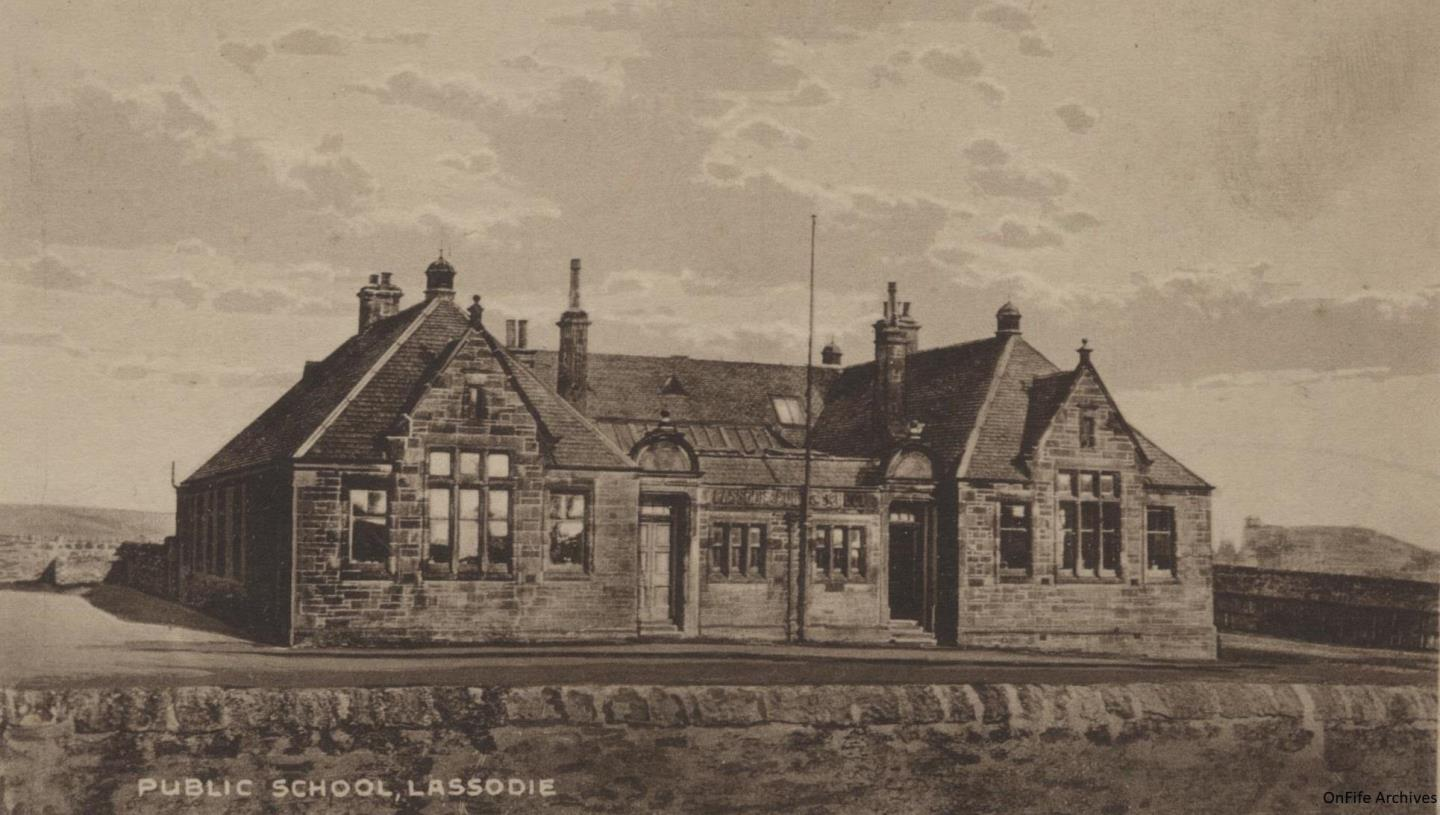
Public school, Lassodie

Lassodie had a Free church (St Ninian's), school, a post office, Miners' Welfare Institute, and a public hall. The only shops of any importance in the place were branches of the Kelty Co-operative Society at Fairfield and at New Rows; New Rows also contained the one public house in the village, the Lassodie Tavern.

The senior association football club Lassodie F.C. had some success in the 1880s, entering the Scottish Cup a number of times, and winning the Fife Cup in 1887–88 and Fifeshire Charity Cup in 1889–90. The village also had a 9-hole golf course between Old and New Rows and Loch Fitty.

Plans for a land sculpture project were initiated, based on Charles Jencks' design, on a 930 acres (3.8 km^{2}) site, but the project was stopped in 2013 due to financial problems at Scottish Coal.

== Notable inhabitants ==
- Lt-Col James Hislop MC, born in Lassodie in 1912, awarded the Military Cross for service in Malaya
