= Temperance Athletic F.C. =

Former association football club in Scotland

Temperance Athletic
- Nickname(s): the Athletics
- Founded: 1887
- Dissolved: 1890
- Ground: Saracen Park
- Hon. Secretary: David Davidson
- Match Secretary: Alex McLaughlan
colours

Temperance Athletic Football Club was a football club from north-west Glasgow.

== History ==
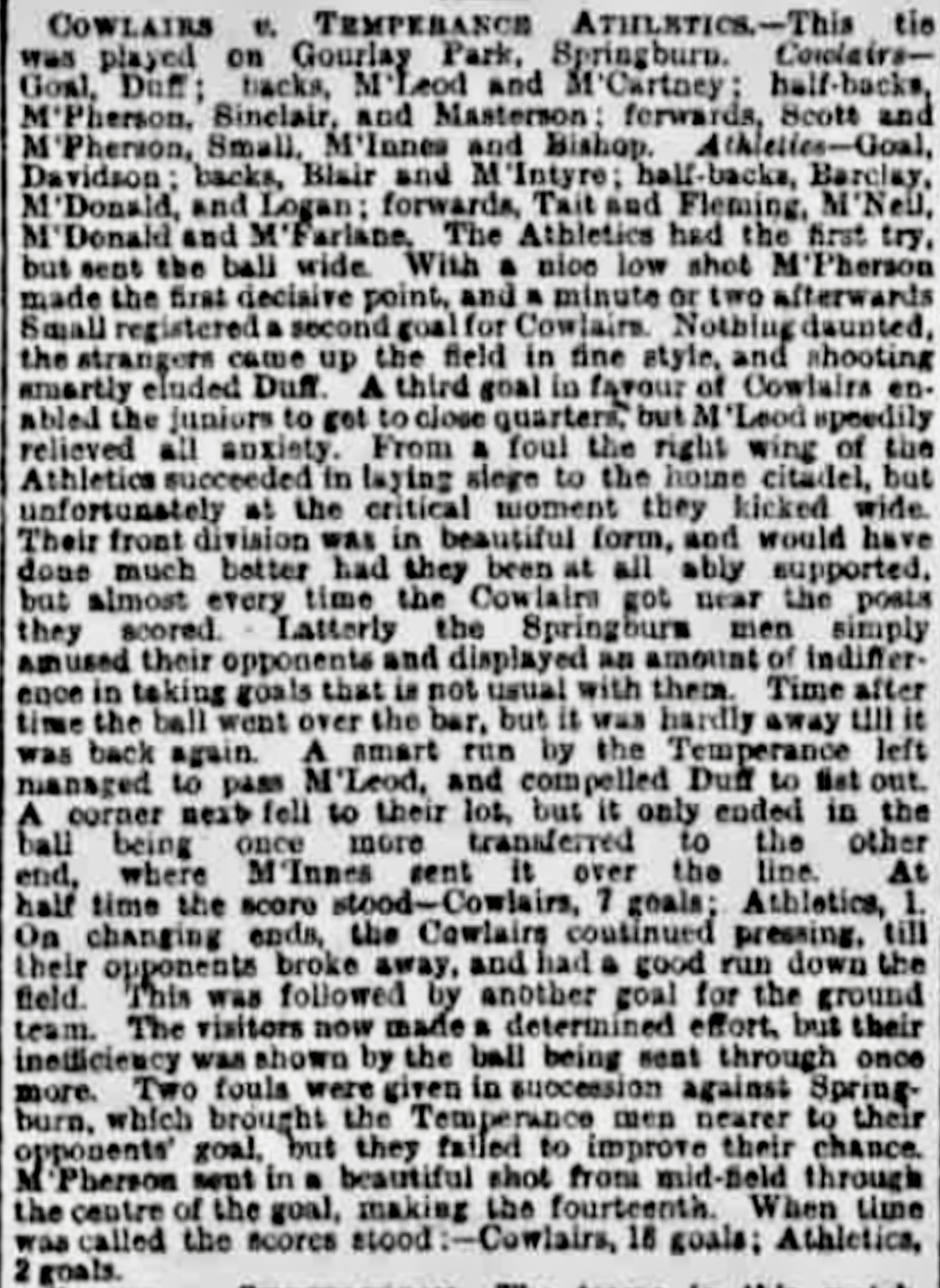
1888–89 Scottish Cup 1st Round, Cowlairs 18–2 Temperance Athletic, Glasgow Herald, 3 September 1888

Temperance Athletic, also known as Glasgow Temperance Athletic, was one of several clubs formed in the 1880s by those who adhered to the Temperance movement. The club's existence overlapped with that of United Abstainers of Crosshill, which diluted the potential membership pool.

The club was formed in June 1887 for total abstainers, as a general athletic club, aimed also at playing rounders and cricket; indeed the club's first fixture was a rounders match against Citizen at Ruchill Park. Its first recorded football match was a 6–0 defeat at Southern Athletic in autumn 1887.

Despite a run of unimpressive results in 1887–88 (its only win of any note being 2–1 at Carlton in February), the club turned senior in August, and entered the 1888–89 Scottish Cup and Glasgow Cup. The club may have been hoping to spread the message that teetotalism was not an impediment to athletic performance, given attempts to set up Temperance Athletic clubs by its Glaswegian members elsewhere in Scotland. However, as far as the Scottish Cup was concerned, the message backfired, as neighbours Cowlairs inflicted on the club the biggest defeat of the first round, by a score of 18 goals to 2. A fortnight later the club recovered enough to lose only 3–2 against Southern Athletic, the outcome perhaps tempered by it being the visitors' only ever competitive victory.

In the first round of the 1889–90 Scottish Cup, the Athletic scratched to Summerton Athletic, and the club also scratched to Carrington in the first round of the Glasgow Cup. There is no further record of the club; an 11–6 win at the obscure Vale Rose club at the end of the year appears to refer to a club from Alexandria, Dumbartonshire. Unsurprisingly the club did not renew its Scottish FA membership for the following season and it was also removed from the Glasgow FA roll.

== Colours ==
The club wore blue and white vertically striped shirts with blue knickers. The colours may have been inspired by the blue ribbons worn by those who had taken the pledge.

== Ground ==
The club's original football pitch was Ruchill Park, which was (and is) a public park. In order to turn senior, the club needed a private ground, and it obtained the use of Saracen Park, which had been the ground of Possilpark.
