= Vale of Leven Hibernians F.C. =

Association football club in Dunbartonshire, Scotland

Vale of Leven Hibernians
- Full name: Vale of Leven Hibernians Football Club
- Nicknames: the Hibs, Vale Hibs
- Founded: 1881
- Dissolved: 1889
- Ground: Hill Street
Home colours

Vale of Leven Hibernians Football Club was an association football club based in the town of Alexandria, in the Vale of Leven area of Dunbartonshire, which entered the Scottish Cup in the 1880s.

== History ==
The club was founded in 1881 and was admitted as a member of the Scottish Football Association that September. It first entered the Scottish Cup a year later, losing 7–1 to Jamestown.

The club was struck from the register in 1883, but soon re-formed, and re-joined the Scottish FA in 1886. The revived club would play Jamestown in the Scottish Cups of 1887–88 and 1888–89; both ties would prove to be acrimonious. In 1887, after Jamestown won 3–2, the Hibs protested against Jamestown's rough play, alleging that the Hibs "had been treated more like beasts than human beings", one player having a stomach wound 7 inches long. The Scottish Football Association ordered a re-play at the Hibs' ground; after it ended 2–2 on 24 September, a 'proper' replay took place, also in Alexandria, which Jamestown won 3–1.

The Jamestown umpire, Daniel Turner, alleged that he had been attacked by two of the Hibs team that evening. The following week, the two players, Michael Kilcoyne and Edward Redden, plus another club member, were put on trial; the defence was that Turner, who was "much the worse of liquor", had struck the first blow, and Kilcoyne struck him in self-defence after it seemed Turner was pressing the attack. The three were acquitted. It was not the end of the matter; the next month the Scottish Football Association suspended two Hibernian players (Cannon and Connor) for a month, and the Hibs umpire M'Dowd for the season, on the basis that "the game...had more the appearance of a melee than a tie" and M'Dowd was "encouraging the players in ungentlemanly conduct".

In 1888, Jamestown protested after losing 6–1, on the bizarre grounds that the team that has just beaten them was "not a club, and that they had not even eleven members". After the Hibs produced membership cards, the Scottish FA dismissed the protest as "the most absurd one that ever came before the Association", resulting in the Scottish FA admonishing Jamestown.

The victory over Jamestown was the club's only Scottish Cup win; in the second round the club lost 3–1 at home to Methlan Park F.C. of Dumbarton. Methlan Park protested that the Vale Hibs' goal was a foot short of going over the line, and claimed a fourth goal which crossed the goal-line as the referee was signalling for time. It was the club's last Cup entry.

In December 1888, the clubs met again at Alexandria in the Dumbartonshire Cup. The Vale Hibs had entered twice before, both times conceding 9 goals to Renton in the club's first matches, and, although the club equalized an early Park goal, the visitors scored six in the second half to win 8–1. This seems to have been the final match for the club.

== Colours ==
The club's colours were dark green shirts, navy knickers, and red stockings. For 1886–87 the shirts were changed to white.

== Ground ==
The club originally played off Bridge Street, and moved to Hill Street on its reformation. For the 1888–89 season, the club moved to a new ground, which was originally part of the old Vale of Leven F.C. ground at North Street Park, and Vale of Leven Wanderers moved into Hill Street.
