= Jack Godsell =

Scottish footballer

Personal information
- Full name: John Dryburgh Godsell
- Date of birth: 13 September 1924
- Place of birth: Lassodie, Fife, Scotland
- Date of death: 29 March 2014 (aged 89)
- Place of death: Kirkcaldy, Fife, Scotland
- Position: Full back

Senior career*
Years	Team	Apps	(Gls)
1945–1946	Forfar Athletic	0	(0)
1946–1948	St. Huddersfield Town	0	(0)
1948–1951	Bradford City	9	(0)
1951–1952	Southport	3	(0)
- Gainsborough Trinity
Total		12	(0)
- * Club domestic league appearances and goals

John Dryburgh Godsell (13 September 1924 – 29 March 2014) was a Scottish professional footballer, who played as a full back.

== Career ==
Born in Lassodie, Godsell played for Forfar Athletic, St. Huddersfield Town, Bradford City, Southport and Gainsborough Trinity.

He made 9 appearances for Bradford City in the Football League.
