= Lassodie F.C. =

Lassodie
- Full name: Lassodie Football Club
- Founded: 1884
- Dissolved: 1894
- Ground: Green Bank Park
- Hon. Secretary: George Wood
- Match Secretary: Andrew Herd
Home colours

Lassodie F.C. was an association football club from the now-lost village of Lassodie, Fife, Scotland.

== History ==
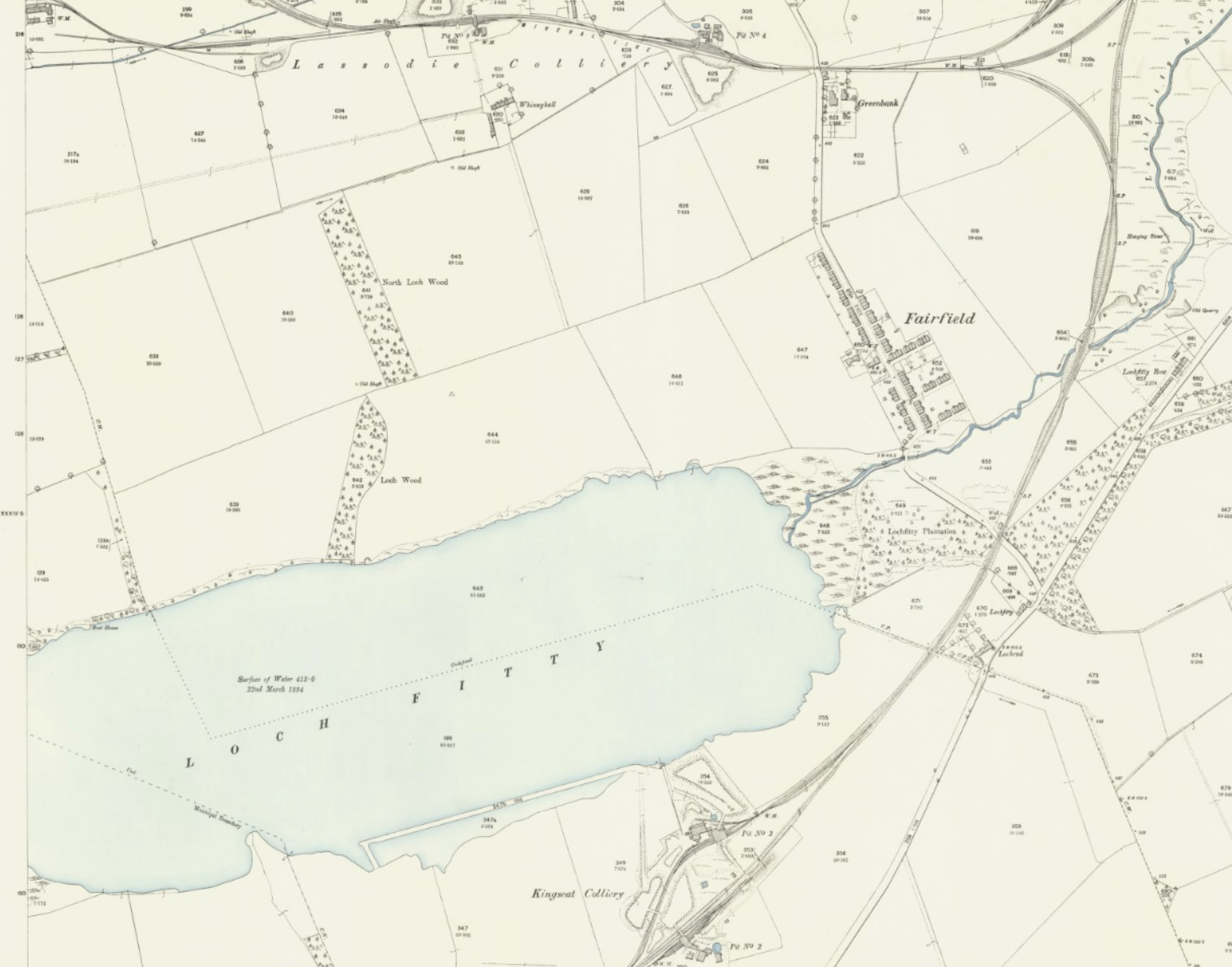
Lassodie from the Ordnance Survey Fifeshire XXXIV.10 sheet, showing Greenbank, the likely location of the pitch

The club was formed in 1883. Its first competitive match came in the Fifeshire Cup in 1885–86 - a season and tournament in which Lassodie had its biggest competitive win, 14–3 at Lumphinnans - and turned senior in 1887 by joining the Scottish Football Association. Despite the small size of Lassodie, the club was one of the first six senior clubs in Fife, along with Alloa Athletic, Dunfermline, Dunfermline Athletic, Cowdenbeath, and Burntisland Thistle.

=== Scottish Cup entry ===
Lassodie duly entered the 1887–88 Scottish Cup and reached the third round, albeit without winning a match. The club lost to Dunfermline in the first round, but Dunfermline was disqualified, as its club secretary had sent its player list in after the due date. Lassodie received a bye in the second round but lost 3–1 to Bo'ness in the third.

Lassodie's only win in the competition came in 1889–90, with a 3–2 win over Burntisland Thistle. The club did not have long to enjoy it, as the following week it lost 13–1 against Cowdenbeath in the East of Scotland Shield. However, the club recovered quickly, as it was drawn to meet Cowdenbeath in the second round of the national competition a fortnight later. This time Lassodie held Cowdenbeath to a 3–3 draw, but the replay did not take place, as Cowdenbeath protested that the Robert Lawson who played for Lassodie was the same Robert Lawson who had played for Dunfermline Athletic in the first round. The Scottish FA instructed the Lassodie secretary to provide proof that they were different players, but he conceded that Lawson was indeed Cup-tied, and so Lassodie was disqualified.

The club continued to enter the competition until 1892–93, by which time the SFA had introduced qualifying rounds, but lost in both of its first qualifying ties to Cowdenbeath.

=== Local competitions ===
Lassodie also entered three main local competitions - the East of Scotland Shield, the King Cup (for clubs in the east outside Edinburgh), and the Fifeshire Cup - and was invited into the Fife Charity Cup, for the leading clubs in the county only.

The club's finest moments came in the Fifeshire Cup. Lassodie reached seven consecutive semi-finals from 1885–86 to 1891–92, and reached three finals; Lassodie won the trophy once, in 1887–88, with a 6–1 replay win over Burntisland Thistle at Lady's Mill in Dunfermline. The club's nemesis was Cowdenbeath, which beat Lassodie in two finals. The 1888–89 final saw both sides reduced to ten men, as right-forward Jock Wilkie of Lassodie and Law of Cowdenbeath "deliberately squared at each other" and "got into grips", thus being ordered off. Wilkie had "come under the censure of the referee" in an East of Scotland Consolation Cup tie with Dunfermline Athletic, which ended 5–5, three months earlier; he did at least have the consolation of getting his county cap, along with team-mates Murphy (half-back) and Masterson (left-forward), in the Fifeshire match against Linlithgowshire that season, and was named as Fife's best player. The 1890–91 final was little better, both sides "playing the man more than the ball".

Lassodie also won the Charity Cup once, in 1889–90, against Dunfermline Athletic in the final after protesting a defeat. The club was unlucky in the King Cup in 1890–91; twice when ahead against holders Armadale in the semi-final, weather brought the tie to a halt in the second half, and Armadale eventually went through to the final.

One other triumph came in the East of Scotland Consolation Cup, in 1891–92. Lassodie had reached the final in 1888–89, but was well beaten by Bo'ness at Burntisland Thistle's Lammerlaw Park, Lassodie's long ball game being unsuited to the good weather, and being out-passed by Bo'ness. En route to the 1891–92 triumph, Lassodie got past Cowdenbeath for the only time competitive football, before beating Adventurers of Edinburgh 3–2 in the final.

=== Change of name for final season ===
The effective end of the club came in August 1894, when it changed its name to Loch Rangers and moved four miles south to Kingseat. The club only lasted one season under that name. The Rangers suffered two heavy defeats in major competition in that season; 11–0 at Broxburn Shamrock in the Scottish Cup and 6–1 to Cowdenbeath in the first round of the East of Scotland Shield. A protest against Cowdenbeath for a breach of competition rules failed. The club was struck from the SFA's roll in August 1895.

== Colours ==
Uniquely in Scotland, the club played in all black.

== Ground ==
The club's ground was Green Bank Park, to the north of the Fairfield settlement. The pitch was notorious for its poor condition, being described as a "sea of mud" in wet conditions and undulations that were "all the world like crossing mountains".

== Honours ==
Fifeshire Cup

- Winners: 1887–88
- Runners-up: 1888–89, 1890–91

Fife Charity Cup

- Winners: 1889–90
- Runners-up: 1887–88

East of Scotland Consolation Cup

- Winners: 1891–92
- Runners-up: 1888–89
