= Darnconner Britannia F.C. =

Former association football club in Scotland

Darnconner Britannia
- Full name: Darnconner Britannia F.C.
- Founded: 1886
- Dissolved: 1914
- Ground: Public Park
- President: W. Roy
- Match Secretary: Gilbert Stewart
- Captain: H. Lyle
Home colours

Darnconner Britannia F.C. was an association football club from the lost village of Darnconner, near Auchinleck in Ayrshire.

== History ==
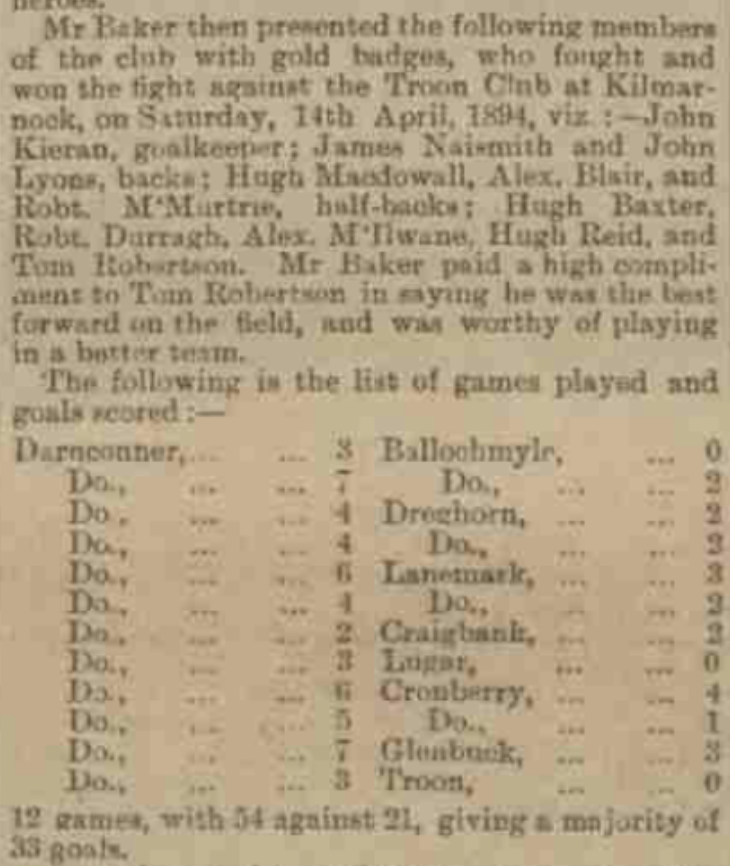
The players who won the Ayrshire 2nd XI Cup for Darnconner Britannia, Ardrossan & Saltcoats Herald, 1 June 1894

The club was founded in 1886, first noted as entering the 1886–87 Ayrshire Cup; the club lost to Cumnock side Nibsters in a first round replay.

The club joined the Scottish Football Association in August 1888, its name described as Britannia (Auchinleck), at the same time as, amongst other clubs, Celtic. It duly entered the 1888–89 Scottish Cup, being drawn to visit Annbank in the first round. The tie was a farce; the tie was set for 1 September, and Britannia, thinking it was to kick off at 3pm, was dressed and ready, and, with Annbank not being present, the club kicked off, scored, and claimed the tie, as was required at the time. Annbank, thinking the tie was to kick off at 4pm, and finding Britannia having already gone, did likewise. Given the circumstances, the tie was properly played off on 8 September, under protest, Annbank winning 5–1. Britannia's protest about being forced to replay was in vain - the club had not included the deposit money, so the Scottish FA dismissed the protest.

The tie was the club's only appearance in the Scottish Cup, as its tenure as a senior club lasted one season, leaving the Scottish FA the following August. The club's final Ayrshire Cup entry had also been in 1888–89; the club lost 8–0 at Ayr, denuded by the loss of the McCulloch brothers (John in goal, and Alexander at full-back) "owing to a dispute".

Britannia did continue however as a Junior club until the First World War, its greatest achievement being to win the Cumnock & District Junior Cup in 1898–99; that season the club also reached the third round of the Scottish Junior Cup for the only time, losing at the original Glenafton Athletic. Its second XI also won the Ayrshire 2nd XI Cup in 1893–94, beating Troon 3–0 in the final at Rugby Park, and nearly defended the trophy successfully, losing 4–1 to Hurlford Thistle in the 1894–95 final.

The name survived in the 1920s as the name of a Juvenile club.

== Colours ==
The club described its colours as red, white, and blue, without giving any more details of its design.

== Ground ==
The club's ground was simply described as the Public Park.
