= Bowling F.C. =

Bowling
- Founded: 1886
- Dissolved: 1893
- Ground: Dunglass Park
- Match Secretary: John Marshall, Charles M'Garry
- Hon. Secretary: Alex M'Donald Scott
Home colours

Bowling F.C. was an association football club from the village of Bowling, West Dunbartonshire, active in the 19th century.

== History ==
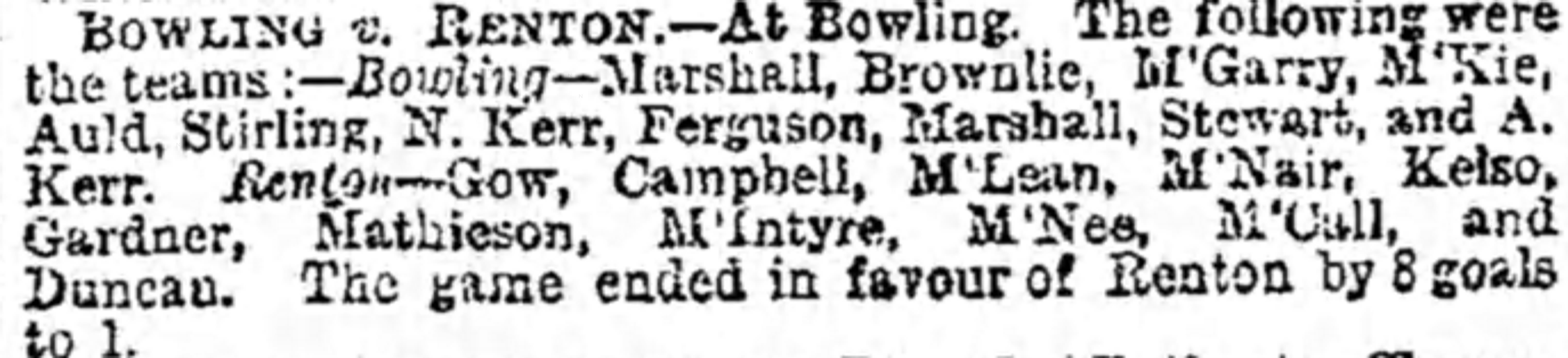
1889–90 Scottish Cup 1st Round, Bowling 1–8 Renton, Glasgow Herald, 9 September 1889

The first record for the club is its playing in the Dunbartonshire Junior Cup in 1886–87. Its first appearance of note was entering the Dunbartonshire Cup in 1887–88, but Bowling scratched when paired with Dumbarton Athletic in the first round.

The club took the bold step of joining the Scottish Football Association in August 1888, despite Dunbartonshire being the home of some of the strongest teams in the world at the time. The futility of such a step was demonstrated by its appearance in the 1888–89 Scottish Cup, losing 8–0 to Renton, which had recently demonstrated a claim to be the very strongest.

The two clubs were drawn together again the following season, this time Bowling at home, but still conceding 8. Bowling did at least score a consolation goal. Two months later, Bowling played for the first time in the Dunbartonshire, at Union, and getting off to the best possible start, by scoring within a minute; even with 20 minutes to go, the score was still 1–1, but Union scored three late unanswered goals. The club put in arguably its best performance in a friendly at the start of the season, drawing 2–2 with Dumbarton, albeit a scratch Dumbarton side.

The Scottish FA introduced qualifying rounds from the 1891–92 season onwards, and Bowling withdrew from the association. It continued to enter the county cup until 1892–93, its best attempt at avoiding defeat coming in a farcical tie against Kirkintilloch Athletic. The first attempt at the match had to be played as a 70-minute friendly as the referee had not turned up at Kirkintilloch, ending with 1 goal to Bowling, and 1 disputed goal to the home side. The second was postponed, and the third won by Kirkintilloch, but Bowling successfully protested that the match finished in darkness due to Athletic not turning up in time. The fourth did not take place, as Bowling did not turn up, and Athletic was awarded the tie, amid local muttering that "the Bowling seem able to play best at the association meetings in Dumbarton".

The final recorded match for the club was a 7–2 defeat at Dumbarton Rangers in February 1893.

== Colours ==
The club wore black and white hoops with white knickers.

== Ground ==
The club played at Dunglass Park, a field behind Dunglass Castle provided by Captain Buchanan, notable for its "neat pavilion and beautiful pitch".

== Notable players ==
- Neilly Kerr, who went on to play for Rangers and Liverpool
