= James Bell (footballer, born 1866) =

Scottish footballer

Personal information
- Full name: James Bell
- Date of birth: 30 March 1866
- Place of birth: Mauchline, Scotland
- Position: Goalkeeper

Senior career*
| Years | Team | Apps | (Gls) |
| 1887–1889 | Dumbarton | | |
| 1889–1890 | Mauchline | | |
| 1890–1891 | Celtic | 15 | (0) |
| 1891–1892 | Hurlford | | |
| 1893–1894 | Kilmarnock | | |
- * Club domestic league appearances and goals

James Bell (born 30 March 1866) was a Scottish footballer.

== Career ==
Bell played club football for Dumbarton, Mauchline, Celtic, Hurlford and Kilmarnock.

== Honours ==
Dumbarton

- Dumbartonshire Cup: Winners 1888-1889
- Greenock Charity Cup: Runners Up 1888–89
- 1 representative cap for Dumbartonshire in 1889.
