= Southern Athletic F.C. =

Association football club in Glasgow City, Scotland

Southern Athletic
- Full name: Southern Athletic Football Club
- Nickname: the Athletics
- Founded: 1884
- Dissolved: 1894
- Ground: Moray Park
- Hon. secretary: John Christie Jr.
- Match secretary: James Kirkland, Hugh A. Mackay
1884–90 colours	1890–94 colours

Southern Athletic Football Club was a 19th-century football club based in Strathbungo, in Glasgow.

== History ==
Southern Athletic F.C. was founded in 1884 out of a cricket club and had 35 members by the end of its first season, when it joined the Scottish Football Association.

Its first Scottish Cup entry was in 1885–86, and it lost to Cambridge, but protested about the non-registration of several Cambridge players, and the Scottish FA ordered a replay to take place at Moray Park. It was to no avail as Cambridge won the second tie as well.

It set the scene for the club's record in competitive football. In 9 Scottish Cup entries, until its final entry in 1893–94, Southern Athletic never won a tie. Its one appearance in the second round, in 1887–88, was down to the luck of the draw, and getting a bye in the first round; in the second, the Athletic lost 9–1 at Cowlairs, despite the "excellent goalkeeper [Fotheringham, also a star batsman], who saved many a well-directed shot". Indeed, the club scratched from 4 of its final 5 entries.

The club did however win one match in the Glasgow Cup, a competition the club only entered from 1887–88 to 1889–90; in 1888–89 it won 3–2 at Temperance Athletic in the first round. In the second it lost 8–0 at Clyde. Its last appearance in the competition was its heaviest competitive defeat, 12–0 at Cambuslang. The club also entered the Govan Jubilee Cup from 1887–88 to 1890–91, again losing in the first round in each.

The Athletics' last Scottish Cup tie was a 6–1 defeat at home to Royal Albert in the first qualifying round in 1891–92. The last recorded matches for the club are from the 1892–93 season; it did enter the Cup for the following year but scratched to the Black Watch.

== Colours ==
The club originally ore one-inch hooped navy blue and white jerseys with blue knickers. In 1890 it changed the colour of the hoops and shorts from navy to black.

== Grounds ==
The club's ground was at Moray Park, 3 minutes' walk from Strathbungo railway station.
