= Townhill, Fife =

Coordinates: 56.059282°N 3.6055588°W

Townhill
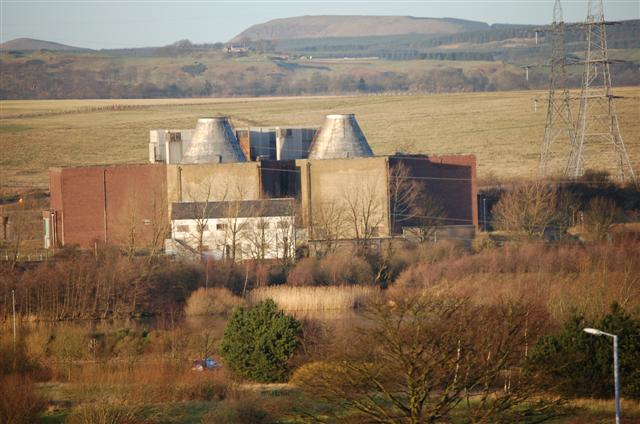
- The disused Townhill Power Station closed in 1985 and the twin chimneys were later removed. The entire structure was demolished in 2008

- Location within Fife
- Population: 1,160 (2020)
- Council area: Fife
- Country: Scotland
- Sovereign state: United Kingdom
- Post town: DUNFERMLINE
- Postcode district: KY12
- Police: Scotland
- Fire: Scottish
- Ambulance: Scottish

Townhill is a small village that lies just north of Dunfermline, Fife, Scotland. The origin of the community is thought to be from the coal-mining industry. There is a Church of Scotland parish church, which shares a minister with nearby Kingseat.

== History ==
There has been references to a village in the area as early as 1322 when the village and nearby loch were known as Monquhir, Moncur or Moncor. The village was renamed Dunfermline Coaltown in the 18th century before the name was changed to Townhill in the early 19th century. The name was changed to Townhill due to the location of the village which is at the top of the hill leading out of Dunfermline. In 1913 the street previously called Old Waggon Road was renamed Moncur Street in acknowledgement of the original name.

Townhill was the site of the gallows serving the Dunfermline district. In September 1709 Janet Mitchell of Saline was executed for murder. They were removed in the middle of the 18th century.

From 1781 the village had a timber track linked to a horse-drawn wagon system, linking the colliery to the ships at Inverkeithing, the chief pit being the Jessie Colliery to the north-east. Other (linked) industries included a brickworks (commonly using the other materials found alongside the coal) and a sandstone quarry. In 1856 the railway was improved and added to the steam engine mineral railway system, with the main pit then being the Crawford Colliery, which remained operational until 1931. Other pits closed by the 1920s included the Humbug, the Eliza, the Donald and the Cairncubie. The Muircockhall Colliery was not altogether abandoned and was used from training purposes until the 1970s.

Those unfit for further work, including widows and injured persons, were housed in the town's purpose-built Poorhouse which stood around a mile to the south, on the road to Dunfermline. Education was piecemeal and irregular until the Education (Scotland) Act 1872, causing a new school to be opened in 1876 under the Dunfermline School Board. The Townhill Colliery at this time was under the control of John Christie.

Dunfermline Town Council bought land in Townhill and Brucefield in 1919 for a new housing scheme under the Housing, Town Planning, &c. Act 1919. 47 of the 376 houses built were in Townhill. Another housing scheme began construction in 1925.

In June 1900 a bowling green was created and in 1906 the town gained a Carnegie Library. In 1935 the pit bing and lands belonging to the no.8 (Townhill) Pit were levelled and transformed into a public park to the north side of the town (paid for by the Miners Welfare Fund).

== Religion ==
The church appears to have been in decline until 1876 when Rev Jacob Primmer (1842-1914) arrived from Leith. He instigated the building of a new church, which was completed in May 1878, close to the school. As a teetotaller he introduced alcohol-free communion wine, causing a national debate in the General Assembly of the Church of Scotland, bringing the town into the limelight briefly in what became known as the "Townhill Question". In 1882 a Free Church of Scotland was established in rivalry, to the south, originally in a prefabricated iron church (made by the Carron ironworks) and overseen by Rev James Smellie. A permanent stone church was built in 1896.

== Archaeology ==
In June 1901 a section of fossil tree (lepidodendron) was found deep in the Townhill Colliery and presented to the school. The fossil is now in Pittencrieff Park in Dunfermline.

== Amenities ==
It is the site of the Scotland National Water ski Centre, and is surrounded by a country park comprising pathways (some of which were originally railway lines for coal works) and a forest.

Other amenities include a public park, community centre which houses Townhill public library.

The local leisure centre is called the Billy Liddell Sports Centre after the former Liverpool Football Club player who was born in the village. The Centre also has a memorial garden and plaque in his honour.

The village also has a primary school which was opened in 1875 by Thomas Spowart, the chairman of the Dunfermline Parish School Board, and extended in 2011. The school serves the villages of Townhill and Kingseat, as well as part of North Dunfermline. As of September 15, 2016 the school had 254 pupils.

== Notes ==
- Pitcairn, Sheila (2000). History of the Old "Fitpaths" and Streets of Dunfermline, Then and Now, Also Crossford, Halbeath, Rosyth, Townhill & Wellwood (PDF). Dunfermline: Pitcairn Publications.
