= Andrew Godsell =

British writer (born 1964)

Andrew Godsell is a British writer, born in 1964 at Aldershot, in Hampshire.

== Writing ==
Godsell has published the following books.

“A History of the Conservative Party” (1989) was the first critical history of the British Conservatives ever published.

“The World Cup” (1990) provides a history of the world's leading football competition.

“Europe United: A History of the European Cup / Champions League” (2005) covers the relevant football competition.

"Legends of British History" (2008) is a panoramic survey, stretching from the origin of Stonehenge five thousand years ago through to controversies in the twenty first century.

"Fifteen Minutes of Fame" (2011) is a satirical commentary on contemporary culture.

"Planet Football" (2012) profiles a dozen stars of the modern game, from Alfredo Di Stefano to Lionel Messi.

Godsell's writings on football, politics, history, genealogy, and rock music have also appeared in magazines and newspapers, plus an educational textbook, and several websites. A theory on the historical events behind the legends of King Arthur has prompted international discussion. Moving from fact to fiction, a contribution to textual accuracy has led to an acknowledgment of Mr A Godsell in the Penguin Classics edition of Dracula by Bram Stoker.

== Biographical detail ==
Godsell has combined writing with a career in finance. Political activism has included candidacies in a series of local elections. Godsell acted as publicity co-ordinator of Brooce Fans for Fair Ticketing, a campaign against ticket touting which attracted media attention, and is mentioned in the book “Twenty Nights to Rock: Touring with the Boss” by Bill Tangen, an American sports writer, and fellow Bruce Springsteen fan. Godsell's supposed failings in the departments of cooking and housework have been discussed with great amusement on ITV's “This Morning” programme, and he was interviewed by Rob Bonnet of the BBC at the 1990 World Cup finals.
