= Kingseat =

Coordinates: 56.09737°N 3.40765°W

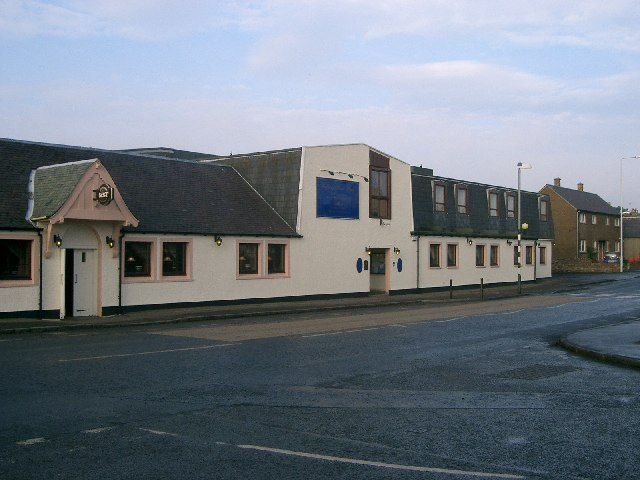
- Halfway House Hotel in the centre of the village

- Location within Fife
- Population: 860 (2020)
- Council area: Fife
- Country: Scotland
- Sovereign state: United Kingdom
- Police: Scotland
- Fire: Scottish
- Ambulance: Scottish

Kingseat is a village in Fife, Scotland, approximately 1.5 miles (2.4 km) northeast of Dunfermline. It was originally a coal mining village with the first pits sunk in the area in the mid 1800s. According to local belief, the village’s name comes from royal visits to the area, where the king was said to have looked out over the River Forth and toward Arthur's Seat.

== Amenities ==
The village has a public park which includes a play area and a football pitch. There is also a Community Leisure Centre, a bowling club, a cattery, and formerly a shop with a post office.

There used to be a hotel in the centre of the village, The Halfway House, but it closed unexpectedly in early 2015. The building was demolished in November 2020.

The village does not have its own primary school and instead falls under the catchment area for Townhill Primary School.
