= Fife Cup =

- Founded: 1882; 144 years ago
- Region: Fife, Scotland
- Teams: 8 (2025-26)
- Current champions: St. Andrews United (1st Title)

The Fife Cup is a Scottish regional football competition for clubs in the historic county of Fife. The competition was founded by the Fifeshire Football Association in 1882. The competition was originally known as the "Fifeshire Cup" from 1882–1896 and the "Fife and District Cup" between 1896 and 1900. It also run on league lines between 1903 and 1905 called the "Fifeshire League" before its current name.

The current holders are St. Andrews United who were the winners of the 2025-26 competition, achieving their first competition victory.

== Participants ==
For the 2025-26 season, eight clubs took part in the competition.

- Burntisland Shipyard
- Cowdenbeath
- Dundonald Bluebell
- Dunfermline Athletic
- East Fife
- Hill of Beath Hawthorn
- Kelty Hearts
- St Andrews United (current champions)

== Winners ==
=== Key ===
Key to list of winners
(R)	Replay
(ET)	Match went to extra time
*	Match decided by which team won the most corner kicks
†	Match decided by a penalty shootout
‡	Competition partially played but incomplete
	Information unavailable
Italics	League format

=== Results ===
Fife Cup winners
Season	Winner	Score	Runner-up	Venue
1882–83	Dunfermline	4–1	Cowdenbeath	Lady's Mill, Dunfermline
1883–84 (R)	Dunfermline	2–0	Alloa Athletic	Dunfermline
1884–85	Cowdenbeath	4–0	Dunfermline	Lady's Mill, Dunfermline
1885–86 (R)	Alloa Athletic	4–0	Cowdenbeath	Lady's Mill, Dunfermline
1886–87	Dunfermline Athletic	3–1	Burntisland Thistle	Crawford's Park, Cowdenbeath
1887–88 (R)	Lassodie	6–1	Burntisland Thistle	Lady's Mill, Dunfermline
1888–89	Cowdenbeath	4–2	Lassodie	East End Park, Dunfermline
1889–90	Cowdenbeath	5–0	Lochgelly Athletic	Lady Well Park, Dunfermline
1890–91	Cowdenbeath	2–1	Lassodie	East End Park, Dunfermline
1891–92	Raith Rovers	3–1	Cowdenbeath	East End Park, Dunfermline
1892–93 (R)	Cowdenbeath	2–1	Raith Rovers	East End Park, Dunfermline
1893–94	Raith Rovers	2–1	Lochgelly United	East End Park, Dunfermline
1894–95	Clackmannan	1–0	Cowdenbeath	Deer Park, Sauchie
1895–96	Clackmannan	–	Cowdenbeath	
1896–97	Dunfermline Athletic	3–2	Clackmannan	Cowdenbeath
1897–98	Raith Rovers	3–1	Alloa Athletic	Newton Park, Kirkcaldy
1898–99	Raith Rovers	2–0	Lochgelly United	Newton Park, Kirkcaldy
1899–1900	Lochgelly United	5–5 ‡	Dunfermline Athletic	
1900–01	Hearts of Beath	–	Raith Rovers	
1901–02	Cowdenbeath	2–1	Hearts of Beath	North End Park, Cowdenbeath
1902–03	Hearts of Beath	– ‡		
1903–04	Cowdenbeath			
1904–05	Cowdenbeath			
1905–06	Raith Rovers	3–2	Cowdenbeath	Scott's Park, Kirkcaldy
1906–07	Kirkcaldy United	3–1	Cowdenbeath	Stark's Park, Kirkcaldy
1907–08 (R)	East Fife	4–2	Lochgelly United	North End Park, Cowdenbeath
1908–09	Raith Rovers	3–0	East Fife	North End Park, Cowdenbeath
1909–10 (R)	Cowdenbeath	2–1	Lochgelly United	North End Park, Cowdenbeath
1910–11	Dunfermline Athletic	2–1	Raith Rovers	Scott's Park, Kirkcaldy
1911–12	Dunfermline Athletic	1–1 *	Cowdenbeath	East End Park, Dunfermline
1912–13	Kirkcaldy United	5–2	East Fife	Stark's Park, Kirkcaldy
1913–14	Dunfermline Athletic	4–1	Lochgelly United	Stark's Park, Kirkcaldy
1914–15	Raith Rovers	4–0	East Fife	Stark's Park, Kirkcaldy
1915–16	Cowdenbeath	2–0	Raith Rovers	North End Park, Cowdenbeath
1916–17	Cowdenbeath	0–0 *	East Fife	North End Park, Cowdenbeath
1917–18	Dunfermline Athletic	1–0	Raith Rovers	Stark's Park, Kirkcaldy
1919–20	Dunfermline Athletic	3–1	Cowdenbeath	East End Park, Dunfermline
1920–21	Raith Rovers	3–2 (ET)	Dunfermline Athletic	East End Park, Dunfermline
1921–22	Raith Rovers	2–0	East Fife	Stark's Park, Kirkcaldy
1922–23	Raith Rovers	0–0 *	Cowdenbeath	Cowdenbeath
1923–24 (R)	Cowdenbeath	3–1	Raith Rovers	Cowdenbeath
1924–25	Raith Rovers	1–0	East Fife	Methil
1925–26	Cowdenbeath	4–1	Lochgelly United	Cowdenbeath
1926–27	Dunfermline Athletic	6–2	Lochgelly United	East End Park, Dunfermline
1927–28	Cowdenbeath	2–1	Dunfermline Athletic	East End Park, Dunfermline
1928–29	Cowdenbeath	3–2	Raith Rovers	Stark's Park, Kirkcaldy
1929–30	Raith Rovers	3–2	East Fife	Methil
1930–31	Raith Rovers	2–2 *	East Fife	Kirkcaldy
1931–32	East Fife	3–1	Cowdenbeath	
1932–33	East Fife	2–1	Raith Rovers	Methil
1933–34	Dunfermline Athletic	2–1	Cowdenbeath	Dunfermline
1934–35	Cowdenbeath	2–1	Dunfermline Athletic	
1935–36	Raith Rovers	3–0	East Fife	Stark's Park, Kirkcaldy
1936–37	East Fife	1–0	Dunfermline Athletic	Bayview Park Methil
1937–38		– ‡		
1938–39	Dunfermline Athletic	1–1 †	Raith Rovers	
1939–40		– ‡		
1945–46	East Fife	3–0	Cowdenbeath	Central Park, Cowdenbeath
1946–47		– ‡		
1947–48	Raith Rovers	3–2	East Fife	Stark's Park, Kirkcaldy
1948–49		– ‡		
1949–50	East Fife	4–3	Cowdenbeath	
1950–51	Raith Rovers	–	Cowdenbeath	
1951–52		2–0	Cowdenbeath	Bayview Park Methil
1952–53	Cowdenbeath/ Raith Rovers	1–1		
1953–54	East Fife/ Raith Rovers	2–2	Stark's Park, Kirkcaldy	
1954–55	Dunfermline Athletic/ Raith Rovers	1–1		
1955–56	Raith Rovers	2–1	East Fife	
1956–57	Raith Rovers	4–1	Dunfermline Athletic	East End Park, Dunfermline
1957–58	Dunfermline Athletic	6–3	Raith Rovers	
1958–59	Dunfermline Athletic	7–6	East Fife	
1959–60	Dunfermline Athletic/ Raith Rovers	2–2		
1960–61	Dunfermline Athletic	5–3	Raith Rovers	
1961–62	Raith Rovers	4–0	East Fife	
1962–63	Dunfermline Athletic	4–0	East Fife	East End Park, Dunfermline
1963–64	Dunfermline Athletic	5–1	East Fife	
1964–65	Dunfermline Athletic	9–4	Raith Rovers	
1965–66	Dunfermline Athletic/ Raith Rovers	6–6		
1966–67	Raith Rovers	5–1	East Fife	Stark's Park, Kirkcaldy
1967–68	Raith Rovers	4–3	East Fife	
1968–69	Raith Rovers	4–1	East Fife	
1969–70	Dunfermline Athletic	1–0	Cowdenbeath	
1969–70	Dunfermline Athletic	1–0	Cowdenbeath	
1970–71	Cowdenbeath	2–0	Dunfermline Athletic	East End Park, Dunfermline
1971–72	Raith Rovers	4–2	Dunfermline Athletic	
1972–73	Dunfermline Athletic	– ‡		
1973–74	Dunfermline Athletic	3–2	Cowdenbeath	
1974–75	Dunfermline Athletic	3–3	East Fife	
1975–76	Raith Rovers	3–2	East Fife	
1976–77	Dunfermline Athletic	5–2	Cowdenbeath	
1977–78	East Fife	– ‡		
1978–79	East Fife	2–2 †	Raith Rovers	
1979–80	Dunfermline Athletic	4–1	East Fife	
1980–81	Raith Rovers	2–0	Dunfermline Athletic	
1981–82	Dunfermline Athletic	2–1	Cowdenbeath	
1982–83	Dunfermline Athletic	2–1	Raith Rovers	
1983–84	Cowdenbeath	2–1	East Fife	
1984–85	East Fife	3–2	Cowdenbeath	
1985–86	Cowdenbeath	1–1 †	East Fife	
1986–87	Raith Rovers	3–1	East Fife	Stark's Park, Kirkcaldy
1987–88	Cowdenbeath	3–1	Raith Rovers	Central Park, Cowdenbeath
1988–89	Cowdenbeath	3–1	Dunfermline Athletic	East End Park, Dunfermline
1989–90	Raith Rovers	7–0	Burntisland Shipyard	
1990–91	Raith Rovers	1–1 †	East Fife	
1991–92	Dunfermline Athletic	4–1	Burntisland Shipyard	
1992–93	Raith Rovers	–	Dunfermline Athletic	Bayview Park Methil
1993–94	Raith Rovers	5–2	Cowdenbeath	Stark's Park, Kirkcaldy
1994–95	Raith Rovers	1–0	Dunfermline Athletic	
1995–96	Cowdenbeath	2–1	East Fife	Bayview Park Methil
1996–97	Dunfermline Athletic	5–0	Raith Rovers	
1997–98	Raith Rovers	6–0	Cowdenbeath	
1998–99	Raith Rovers	4–0	Burntisland Shipyard	
1999–2000	Raith Rovers	2–1	Cowdenbeath	
2000–01	Dunfermline Athletic	1–0	Raith Rovers	
2001–02	Raith Rovers	–	Cowdenbeath	
2002–03	Dunfermline Athletic	4–1	Raith Rovers	East End Park, Dunfermline
2003–04	Raith Rovers	1–1 †	Dunfermline Athletic	
2004–05	East Fife	3–2	Raith Rovers	
2005–06	East Fife	1–0	Dunfermline Athletic	
2006–07	Dunfermline Athletic	1–1 †	East Fife	
2007–08	East Fife	2–0	Raith Rovers	
2008–09		– ‡		
2009–10		– ‡		
2010–11		– ‡		
2011–12	Raith Rovers	3–0	Cowdenbeath	Stark's Park, Kirkcaldy
2012–13		– ‡		
2013–14	Cowdenbeath	– ‡		
2014–15	Final not played			
2015–16	East Fife	1–0	Cowdenbeath	
2016–17	Cowdenbeath	2–1	Raith Rovers	Stark's Park, Kirkcaldy
2017–18	Burntisland Shipyard	4–0	Cowdenbeath	Recreation Park, Burntisland
2018–19	Dunfermline Athletic	3–0	East Fife	East End Park, Dunfermline
2019–20	Final not played			
